= Madukkarai (disambiguation) =

Madukkarai is a suburb of Coimbatore city in the Indian state of Tamil Nadu.

Madukkarai may also refer to:

- Madukkarai Wall
- Madukkarai railway station
- Madukkarai Block
- Madukkarai taluk
