= Valukkupparai =

Village in Tamil Nadu, India

Coordinates: 10°50′53″N 76°58′15″E

Valukkuparai is a village in Madukkarai Taluk, Coimbatore district, Tamil Nadu, India. It is 6.4 km (4.0 mi) from Madukkarai and 18.2 km (11.3 mi) from Coimbatore city (Ukkadam). Valukkupparai is a Panchayat that includes the Meenachipuram, Kannamanaiganur villages and some growing real estate sites. People in this village are engaged in agriculture business and cultivation of maize, vegetables, cotton and coconuts. Most of the people are farmers mostly having cows and engaging in doing milk business.
