= Thenkarai, Coimbatore =

Thenkarai
- Panchayat town
- Location in Tamil Nadu, India
- Coordinates: 10°56′51″N 76°50′33″E
- Country: India
- State: Tamil Nadu
- District: Coimbatore

Area
  - Total: 12 km^{2} (4.6 sq mi)

Population (2011)
  - Total: 7,349
  - Density: 610/km^{2} (1,600/sq mi)

Languages
  - Official: Tamil
- Time zone: UTC+5:30 (IST)

Thenkarai is a panchayat town in Perur taluk of Coimbatore district in the Indian state of Tamil Nadu. Located in the western part of the state, it is one of the 33 panchayat towns in the district. Spread across an area of 12 km^{2} (4.6 sq mi), it had a population of 7,349 individuals as per the 2011 census.

== Geography and administration ==
Thenkarai is located in Perur taluk in Coimbatore division of Coimbatore district in the Indian state of Tamil Nadu. It is one of the 33 panchayat towns in the district. Spread across an area of 12 km^{2} (4.6 sq mi), it is located in the western part of the state.

The town panchayat is headed by a chairperson, who is elected by the members, who are chosen through direct elections. The town forms part of the Thondamuthur Assembly constituency that elects its member to the Tamil Nadu legislative assembly and the Pollachi Lok Sabha constituency that elects its member to the Parliament of India.

== Demographics ==
As per the 2011 census, Thenkarai had a population of 7,349 individuals across 2,093 households. The population saw a marginal increase compared to the previous census in 2001 when 7,130 inhabitants were registered. The population consisted of 3,657 males and 3,692 females. About 567 individuals were below the age of six years. About 13.8% of the population belonged to scheduled castes and 1% belonged to scheduled tribes. The entire population is classified as urban. The town has an average literacy rate of 64.8%.

About 57.7% of the eligible population were employed, of which majority were involved in agriculture and allied activities. Hinduism was the majority religion which was followed by 98.6% of the population, with Christianity (1.2%) and Islam (0.1%) being minor religions.
