= Suryakanthan =

- சூர்யகாந்தன்
- Born: 17 July 1955 (age 71); Coimbatore district, Tamil Nadu, India

Suryakanthan (Tamil: சூர்யகாந்தன்; born 17 July 1955) is a Tamil poet, short story writer, and novelist.

== Biography ==
Suryakanthan was born on July 17, 1955, in Ramachettipalayam village in Perur taluk of Coimbatore district, Tamil Nadu to Marappagounder and Chinnammal. He holds master's and doctoral degrees. He is an assistant professor in the Department of Tamil at the Government Arts College, Coimbatore.

== Writing career ==
His first poem was published in 1973 in the literary magazine Manithan under the title Uzhaikkum Vargam Urangumo. His first short story was published in 1974 in the literary magazine Thamarai under the title "Thandikkappadatha Kutravaligal". He has published three poetry collections, six essay collections, eleven short story collections, and eleven novels. His works are taught as part of the curriculum in several universities. His works have been published in magazines such as Amudha Surabhi, Kumkumam, Kalki, Subhamangala, Puthiya Paarvai, Dinamani Kathir and many more. His first novel, Amman Poovoodu, was published in 1984. He continued to write short stories, novels and essays. He wrote under the pseudonyms of Makaranta Kumar, Kadal Kondan, R.M. Surya, Parvatha, Soori and many more.

== Works ==
=== Poetry ===
- "Uzhaikkum Vargam Urangumo" (1973)

=== Short stories ===
- "Thandikkappadatha Kutravaligal" (1974)

=== Novels ===
- Amman Poovoodu. 1984.
- Maanavari Manithargal
- Vithaicholam.

== Awards ==
- Akilan Novel Competition Prize, for Maanavari Manithargal
- Award for Best Novel in Literary Thought, for Maanavari Manithargal (Novel)
- Literary Street Award
- Tamil Nadu Kalai Ilakkiya perumantra Award
- Azhagiya Nayagi Ammal Award
- Lily Deva Sigamani Foundation Award
- Bharathiar University Tamil Scholar Award
- Udumalai Ilakkiya Peravai Award
- Kongu Achievement Award
- Tamil Cultural Centre Award
