= Anaimalai =

- Panchayat town
- Location in Tamil Nadu, India
- Coordinates: 10°34′48″N 76°55′48″E
- Country: India
- State: Tamil Nadu
- District: Coimbatore

Area
  - Total: 25.12 km^{2} (9.70 sq mi)

Population (2011)
  - Total: 17,208
  - Density: 685.0/km^{2} (1,774/sq mi)

Languages
  - Official: Tamil
- Time zone: UTC+5:30 (IST)

Anaimalai is a panchayat town in Anaimalai taluk of Coimbatore district in the Indian state of Tamil Nadu. It is located in the north-western part of the state. Spread across an area of 25.12 km^{2} (9.70 sq mi), it had a population of 17,208 individuals as per the 2011 census.

== Geography and administration ==
Anaimalai is located in Anaimalai taluk of Coimbatore district in the Indian state of Tamil Nadu. It was part of Pollachi taluk till 2018, when a separate taluk was created with Anaimalai as headquarters. Spread across an area of 25.12 km^{2} (9.70 sq mi), it is one of the 33 panchayat towns in the district. It is located in the western part of the state. The region has a tropical climate with hot summers and mild winters. The highest temperatures are recorded in April and May, with lowest recordings in December-January. The Anamalai Tiger Reserve is a protected area that includes part of the region.

The town panchayat is headed by a chairperson, who is elected by the members, who are chosen through direct elections. The town forms part of the Valparai Assembly constituency that elects its member to the Tamil Nadu legislative assembly and the Pollachi Lok Sabha constituency that elects its member to the Parliament of India.

== Demographics ==
As per the 2011 census, Anaimalai had a population of 17,208 individuals across 4,933 households. The population saw a marginal increase compared to the previous census in 2001 when 16,467 inhabitants were registered. The population consisted of 8,279 males and 8,929 females. About 1,548 individuals were below the age of six years. The entire population is classified as urban. The town has an average literacy rate of 78.9%. About 12.5% of the population belonged to scheduled castes.

About 47.5% of the eligible population were employed full-time. Hinduism was the majority religion which was followed by 74.6% of the population, with Islam (24.3%) forming a significant minority. The Masani Amman temple is a major Hindu pilgrimage center.
