= Thirumalayampalayam =

- Panchayat town
- Location in Tamil Nadu, India
- Country: India
- State: Tamil Nadu
- District: Coimbatore

Area
  - Total: 30.65 km^{2} (11.83 sq mi)

Population (2011)
  - Total: 12,164
  - Density: 396.9/km^{2} (1,028/sq mi)

Languages
  - Official: Tamil
- Time zone: UTC+5:30 (IST)

Thirumalayampalayam is a panchayat town in Madukkarai taluk of Coimbatore district in the Indian state of Tamil Nadu. Located in the western part of the state close to the border with Kerala, it is one of the 33 panchayat towns in the district. Spread across an area of 30.65 km^{2} (11.83 sq mi), it had a population of 12,164 individuals as per the 2011 census.

== Geography and administration ==
Thirumalayampalayam is located in Madukkarai taluk of Coimbatore district in the Indian state of Tamil Nadu. It is one of the 33 panchayat towns in the district. Spread across an area of 30.65 km^{2} (11.83 sq mi), it is located on the road connecting Coimbatore with Palakkad in the western part of the state close to the border with Kerala.

The town panchayat is headed by a chairperson, who is elected by the members representing each of the 15 wards. The members are elected through direct elections. The town forms part of the Kinathukadavu Assembly constituency that elects its member to the Tamil Nadu legislative assembly and the Pollachi Lok Sabha constituency that elects its member to the Parliament of India.

== Demographics ==
As per the 2011 census, Thirumalayampalayam had a population of 12,164 individuals across 3,375 households. The population saw a marginal increase compared to the previous census in 2001 when 11,136 inhabitants were registered. The population consisted of 6,034 males and 6,130 females. About 1,024 individuals were below the age of six years. About 23.9% of the population belonged to scheduled castes and 1.3% belonged to scheduled tribes. The entire population is classified as urban. The town has an average literacy rate of 71.9%.

About 52.8% of the eligible population were employed, of which majority were involved in agriculture and allied activities. Hinduism was the majority religion which was followed by 97.2% of the population, with Christianity (1.7%) and Islam (0.7%) being minor religions.
