= Vettaikaaran =

Vettaikaaran or Vettaikkaran is a word in the Tamil language, meaning "hunter". It may refer to these Indian films:

- Vettaikkaran (1964 film), by M. A. Thirumugam
- Vettaikaaran (2009 film), action drama film by B. Babusivan

== See also ==
- Vettaikaranpudur, a village in Coimbatore district, Tamil Nadu, India
