= Pollachi(South) Block =

Pollachi(South) block is a revenue block of Coimbatore district of the Indian state of Tamil Nadu. This revenue block consist of 26 panchayat villages.

== List of Panchayat Villages ==
They are,

SI.No	Panchayat Village
1	Ambarampalayam
2	Chinnampalayam
3	Dhalavaipalayam
4	Gomangalam
5	Gomangalampdr
6	Kanjampatti
7	Kolarpatti
8	Koolanaickenpati
9	Makkinampatti
10	Naickenpalayam
11	Nallampalli
12	Nallur
13	Nattukalpalayam
14	Palayur
15	S.Malayandipatinam
16	S.Ponnapuram
17	Seelakkampatti
18	Singanallur
19	Sinjuvadi
20	Solapalayam
21	Thenkumaraplm
22	Thondamuthur
23	Unjavelampatti
24	Vakkampalayam
25	Veeralpatti
26	Z.Kottampatti
