= Kottur, Tamil Nadu =

Panchayat town in Tamil Nadu, India

Kottur
- panchayat town
- Location in Tamil Nadu, India
- Coordinates: 10.5344°N 76.9774°E
- Country: India
- State: Tamil Nadu
- District: Coimbatore

Area
  - Total: 26.7 km^{2} (10.3 sq mi)

Population (2011)
  - Total: 26,627
  - Density: 997/km^{2} (2,580/sq mi)

Languages
  - Official: Tamil
- Time zone: UTC+5:30 (IST)
- PIN: 642114
- Telephone code: 04259
- Vehicle registration: TN 41

Kottur is a panchayat town in Anaimalai taluk of Coimbatore district in the Indian state of Tamil Nadu. It is located in the north-western part of the state. Spread across an area of 26.7 km^{2} (10.3 sq mi), it had a population of 26,627 individuals as per the 2011 census.

== Geography and administration ==
Kottur is located in Anaimalai taluk of Coimbatore district in the Indian state of Tamil Nadu. Spread across an area of 26.7 km^{2} (10.3 sq mi), it is located in the western part of the state. It is one of the 33 panchayat towns in the district.

The town panchayat is headed by a chairperson, who is elected by the members, who are chosen through direct elections. The town forms part of the Valparai Assembly constituency that elects its member to the Tamil Nadu legislative assembly and the Pollachi Lok Sabha constituency that elects its member to the Parliament of India.

== Demographics ==
As per the 2011 census, Kottur had a population of 26,627 individuals across 7,769 households. The population saw a marginal increase compared to the previous census in 2001 when 25,261 inhabitants were registered. The population consisted of 13,105 males and 13,522 females. About 2,124 individuals were below the age of six years. The entire population is classified as urban. The town has an average literacy rate of 74.1%. About 14.8% of the population belonged to scheduled castes.

About 47.2% of the eligible population were employed, of which majority were involved in agriculture and allied activities. Hinduism was the majority religion which was followed by 91.3% of the population, with Christianity (3.4%) and Islam (5.2%) being minor religions.
