= Periyanayakkanpalayam Block =

Periyanayakkanpalayam block is a revenue block of Coimbatore district of the Indian state of Tamil Nadu. This revenue block consist of 9 panchayat villages.

== List of Panchayat Villages ==
They are,

SI.No	Panchayat Village
1	Asokapuram
2	Bilichi
3	Chinna Thadagam
4	Kurudampalayam
5	Naickenpalayam
6	Nanjundapuram
7	Pannimadai
8	Somayampalayam
9	Veerapandi
