= Chinnakallar Falls =

Waterfall in the Valparai taluk, India

Chinnakallar Falls is a waterfall in the Valparai taluk, Coimbatore district, in the Indian state of Tamil Nadu. A narrow trail through rugged vegetation leads to the waterfalls. The area where this waterfall is situated is considered the third wettest place in India in terms of annual rainfall, after Mawsynram and Cherrapunji.

A song from the Tamil film Suryavamsam, featuring actor Sarath Kumar, was filmed at the waterfall. Coordinates:10°18'11"N 77°01'47"E.

== See also ==
- List of waterfalls
- List of waterfalls in India
