= Kovaipudur =

Coimbatore, Tamil Nadu, India

- Neighbourhood
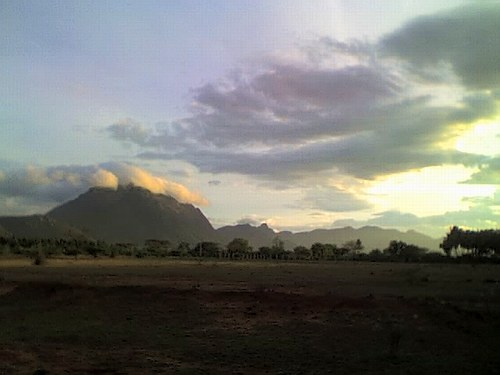
- Skyline of Kovaipudur
- Interactive map of Kovaipudur
- Coordinates: 10°56′12″N 76°57′4″E
- Country: India
- State: Tamil Nadu
- District: Coimbatore District
- Metro: Coimbatore
- Time zone: +5.30GMT
- PIN: 641042
- Telephone code: +91-422
- Vehicle registration: TN-99

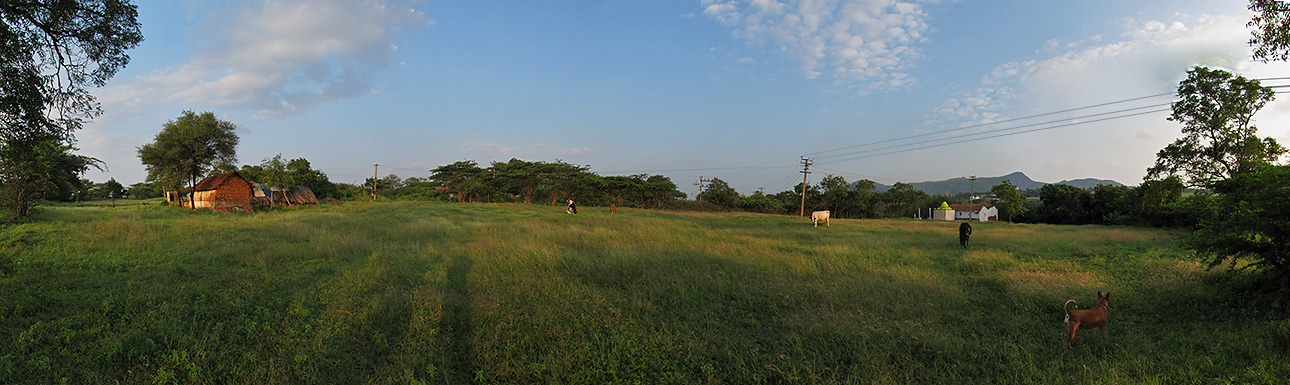
Pasture land near the Kovaipudur stream

Kovaipudur is a large township at the foothills of the Western Ghats, located in the City of Coimbatore, Tamil Nadu, India. The Regional Transport Office (RTO) of Coimbatore West (TN 99) is located at Kovaipudur. People represent this city as Little Ooty due to its cool climate and serene environment, and was set up sometime in late seventies. Today this township has about 7500 families, three arts colleges, one engineering college, a polytechnic and a handful of schools. Kovaipudur has come under the Corporation of Coimbatore and became one of the average localities in Coimbatore.

== Location ==
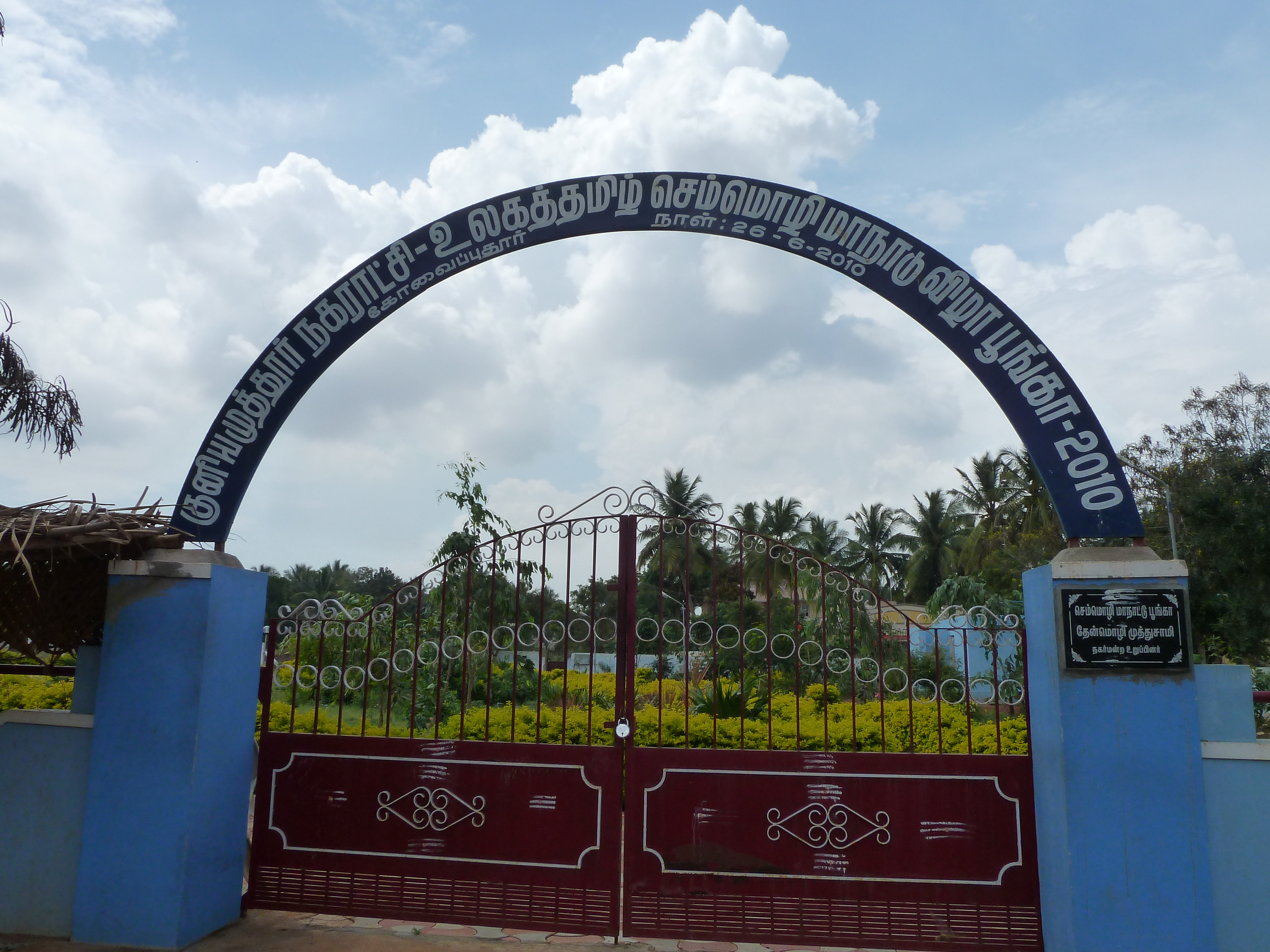
Semmozhi Poonga (Park)

Kovaipudur lies at the mouth of the Palghat Pass and at the south western fringe of the Coimbatore city, bordering the Western Ghats at the foothills of the Madukkarai range in Coimbatore and the Walayar ranges in Kerala. Kovaipudur has mainly scrub vegetation as these hills make it a rainshadow area. The mean temperature is significantly lower than Coimbatore city.

There is a police training academy, along with numerous schools and colleges. Shanti Ashram, a renowned social organization of the region. Kovaipudur has a huge playground where sports like Cricket, Football, Volleyball and lots of other sports are played everyday by school and college students and even middle aged people. There is also an integrated township with a golf course.

A small park by the name 'Semmozhi Poonga' was opened for the general public. Many people come to the park for walking.

== Religious places ==
As the large majority of the population is Hindu, there are many Hindu temples like Sri.Rukmini Satyabhama Samedha Sri.Venugopala Perumal and Sridevi Boodevi Samedha Kalyana Venkatesa Perumal temple, Nagapillayar, Kasi Visalakshi, Sundara Vinayagar, Sri Gopalaswamy, Sri Ragavendraswamy and Lord Ayyapa. In addition, there are Infant Jesus Church, IPA Faith City Church, CSI Christ Church, few other protestant churches and a masjid.

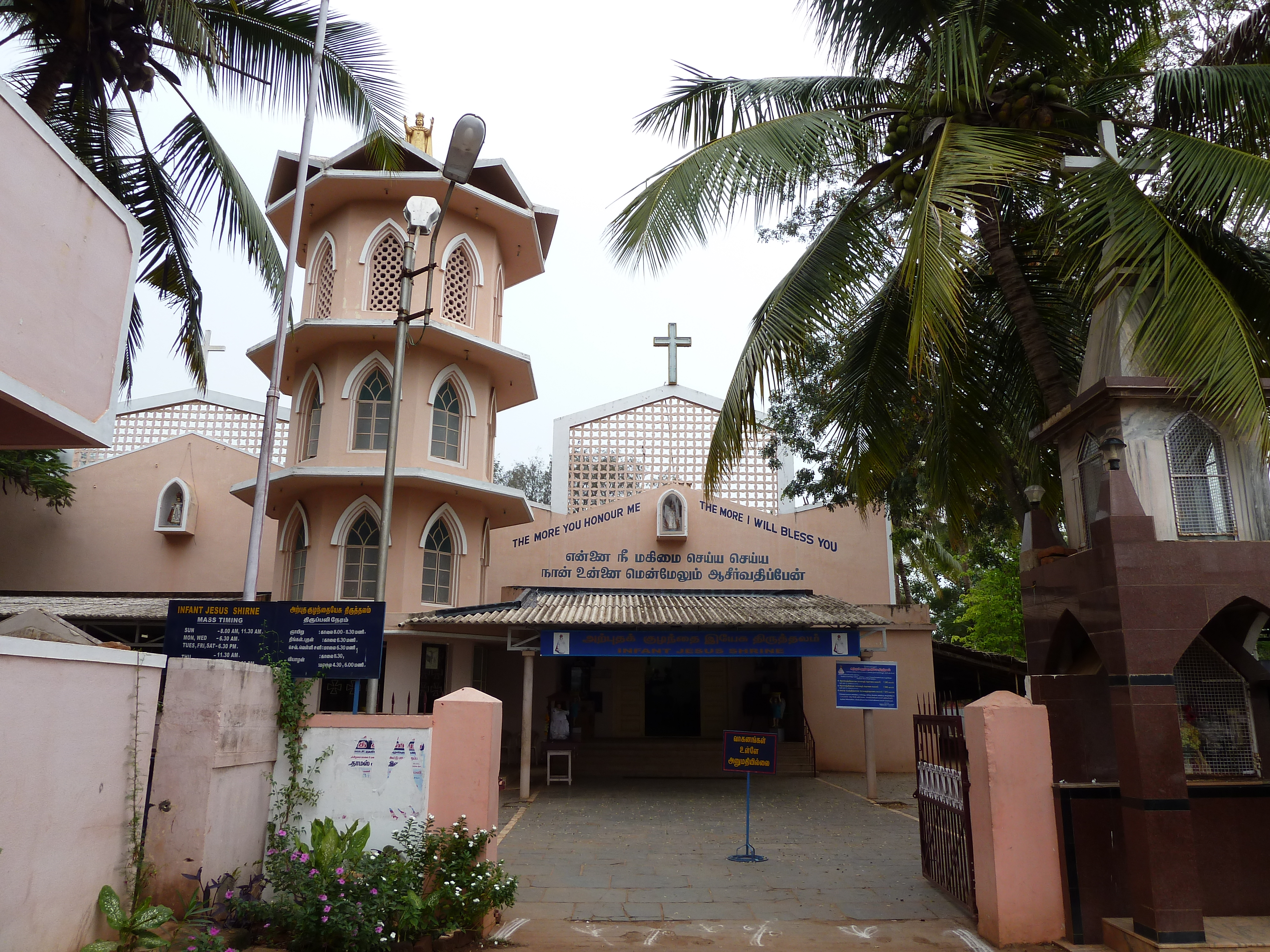
Entrance of Infant Jesus Church

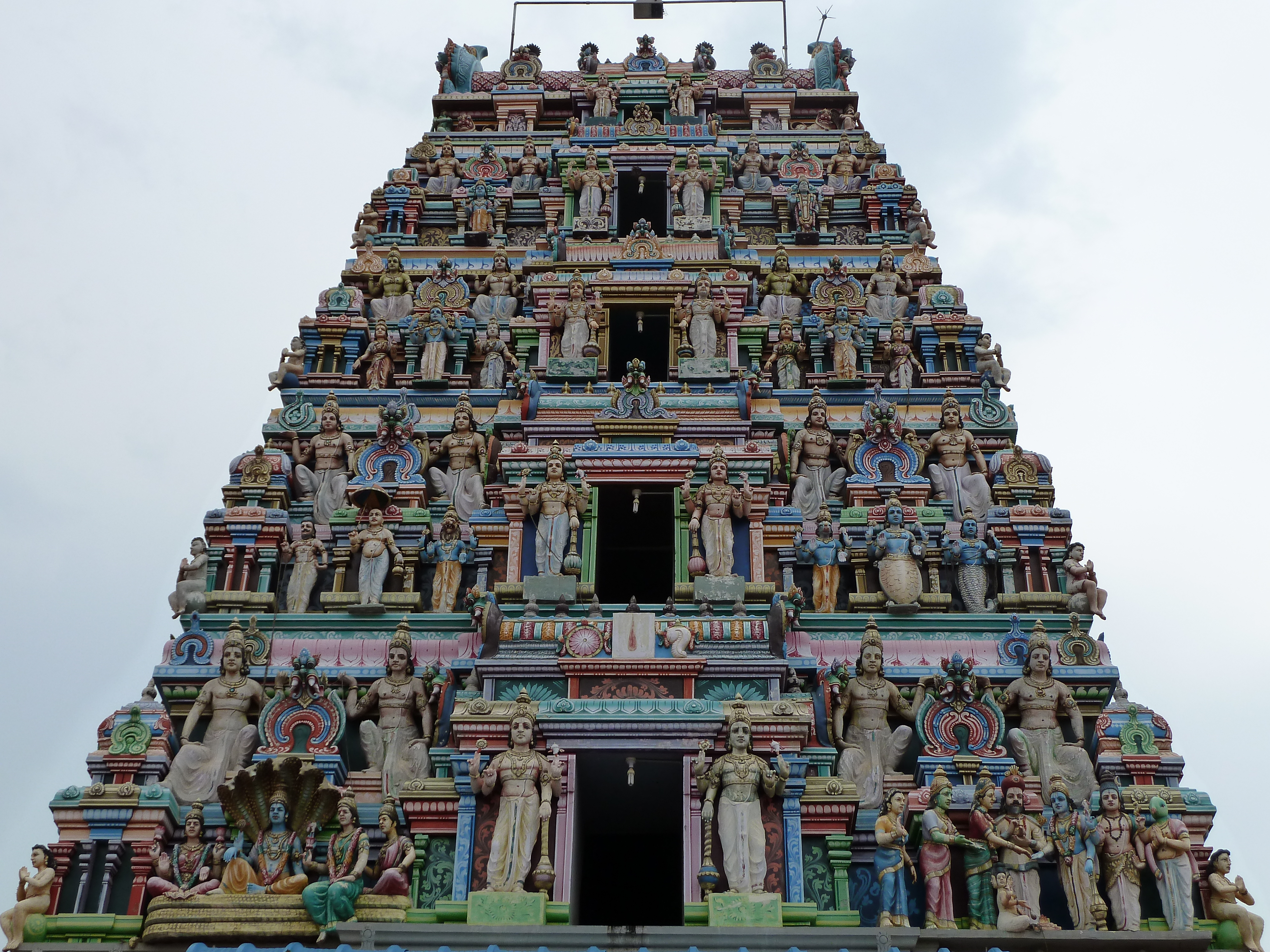
Vimhana of Venugopal Swami temple

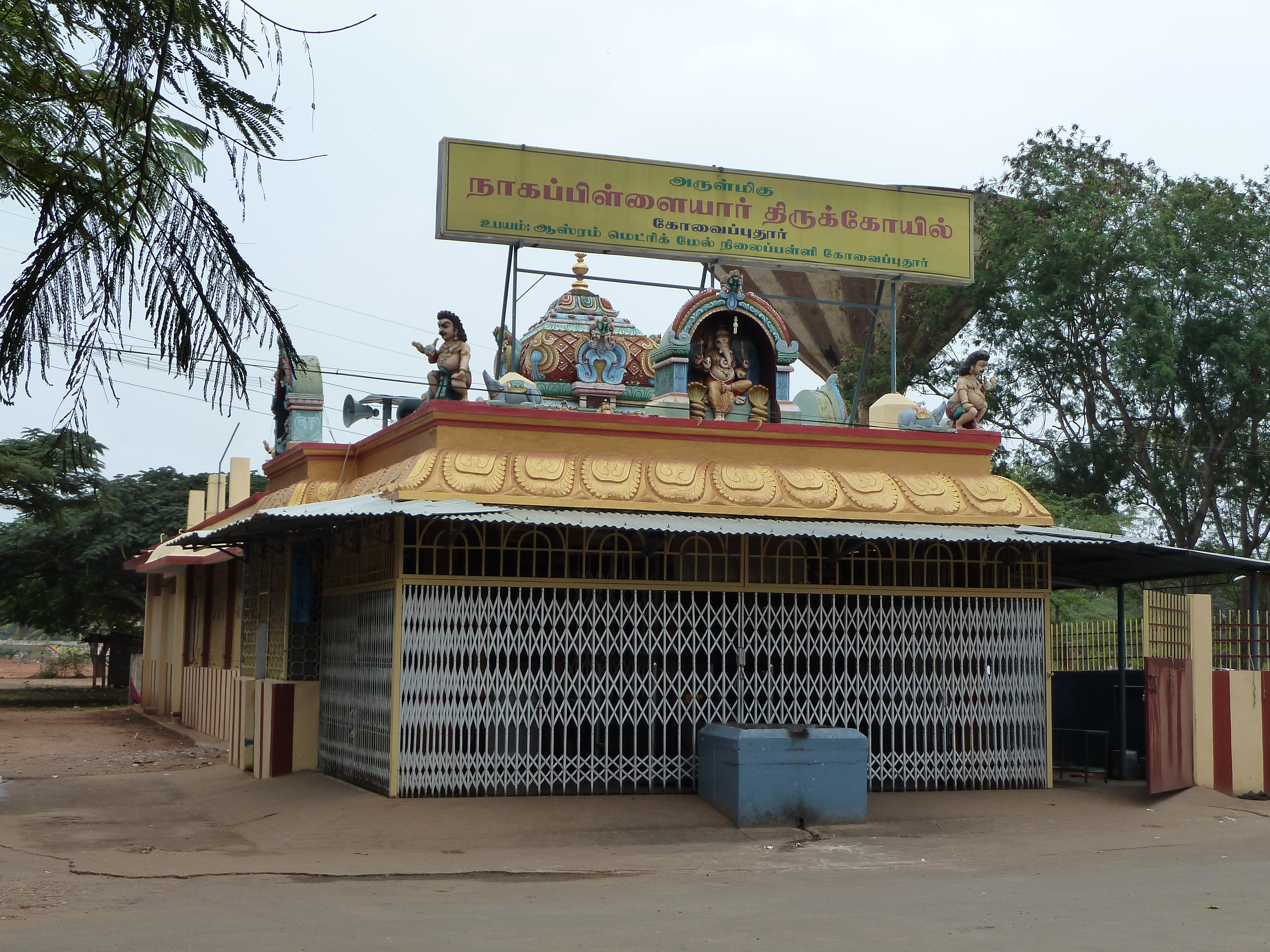
Nagapillayar Kovil

== Environment ==
Temperatures are cooler than Coimbatore city on an average. From April to May, the SW monsoon winds pass over Malampuzha dam waters in Kerala. From June to September, the winds pass through the rain drops and over the dam waters, cooling the air like in an evaporating air cooler. From October to March, the NW monsoon winds bring rain to Kovaipudur. The breeze velocity is high due to the venturi effect of the Palghat pass.
