= Perur Chettipalayam =

- Village Panchayat
- Interactive map of Perur Chettipalayam
- Country: India
- State: Tamil Nadu
- District: Coimbatore

Government
  - Type: Village Panchayat
  - Body: Panchayat Borde Council
  - Chief Minister: M.K Stalin

Area
  - Total: 11.17 km^{2} (4.31 sq mi)

Population (2011)
  - Total: 17,809
  - Density: 1,594/km^{2} (4,129/sq mi)
- Demonym: Indian

Languages
  - Official: Tamil
- Time zone: UTC+5:30 (IST)
- PIN: 641010

Perur Chettipalayam is a village Panchayat of Thondamuthur Panchayat Union in Coimbatore District. Perur Chettipalayam is 7 km southwest from Coimbatore City. This is located next to Perur in Gandhipuram-Kovaiputhur road. In Coimbatore there are many Chettipalayam like Ramachettipalayam, Chettipalayam near mathukkarai, So the name Perur Chettipalayam is derived from the place is located next to Perur.

== Demographic ==
In Perur Chettipalayam village Panchayat Total population has 17809. Of which 8,891 are males while 8,918 are females as per report released by Census India 2011. Tamil language is a primary speaking language. Some peoples are speaking Telugu language. Agriculture work and agri related work is main occupation. Rest of people are working for salary base and kooli.

== Sub Villages ==
- Chettipalayam
- Arumugam Goundanur
- Pachapalayam

== Important place ==
- Kaaliyamman Kovil
- Perur Chettipalayam lake
- Ground for Wednesday Market
- Coimbatore Aavin
- Singanur amman temple Arumugagoundanur
- Veeramathi amman temple Arumugagoundanur

== See also ==
- Aavin
- Thondamuthur
