= Periyanaickenpalayam =

- Panchayat town
- Location in Tamil Nadu, India
- Coordinates: 11.15°N 76.9333°E
- Country: India
- State: Tamil Nadu
- District: Coimbatore

Area
  - Total: 9.37 km^{2} (3.62 sq mi)

Population (2011)
  - Total: 25,930
  - Density: 2,770/km^{2} (7,170/sq mi)

Languages
  - Official: Tamil
- Time zone: UTC+5:30 (IST)

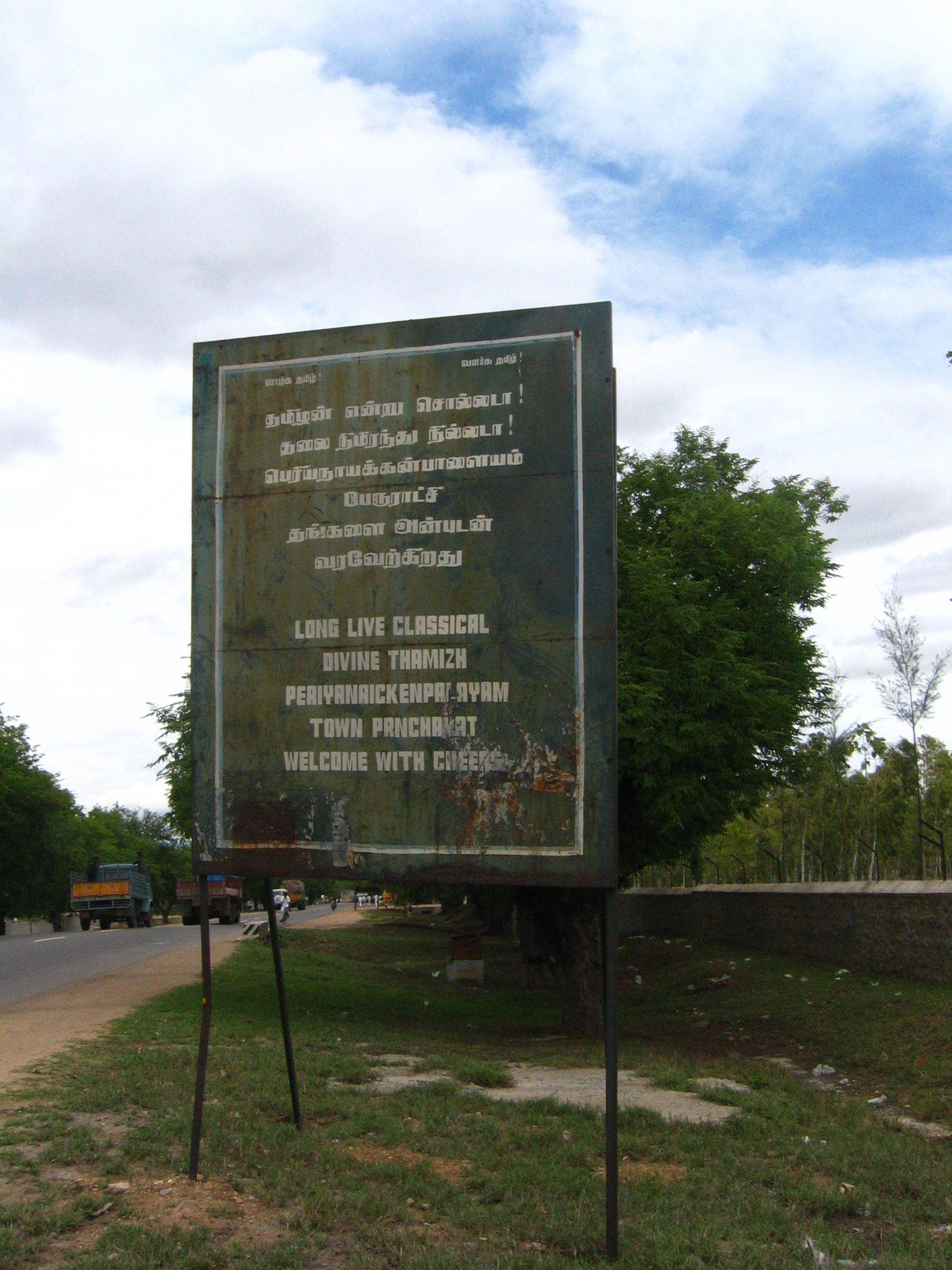

Periyanaickenpalayam is a panchayat town in Coimbatore North taluk of Coimbatore district in the Indian state of Tamil Nadu. Located in the north-western part of the state, it is one of the 33 panchayat towns in the district. Spread across an area of 9.37 km^{2} (3.62 sq mi), it had a population of 25,930 individuals as per the 2011 census.

== Geography and administration ==
Periyanaickenpalayam is located in Coimbatore North taluk of Coimbatore district in the Indian state of Tamil Nadu. Spread across an area of 9.37 km^{2} (3.62 sq mi), it is located in the western part of the state. It is one of the 33 panchayat towns in the district. The region has a tropical climate with hot summers and mild winters. The highest temperatures are recorded in April and May, with lowest recordings in December-January.

The town panchayat is headed by a chairperson, who is elected by the members, who are chosen through direct elections. The town forms part of the Kavundampalayam Assembly constituency that elects its member to the Tamil Nadu legislative assembly and the Coimbatore Lok Sabha constituency that elects its member to the Parliament of India.

== Demographics ==
As per the 2011 census, Periyanaickenpalayam had a population of 25,930 individuals across 7,377 households. The population saw a marginal increase compared to the previous census in 2001 when 22,844 inhabitants were registered. The population consisted of 13,010 males and 12,9204 females. About 2,294 individuals were below the age of six years. The entire population is classified as urban. The town has an average literacy rate of 89%. About 10.3% of the population belonged to scheduled castes.

About 43.5% of the eligible population were employed, of which majority were involved in agriculture and allied activities. Hinduism was the majority religion which was followed by 91.8% of the population, with Christianity (6.0%) and Islam (2.1%) being minor religions.
