= Zamin Uthukuli =

- Panchayat town
- Location in Tamil Nadu, India
- Coordinates: 10°39′01″N 76°58′44″E
- Country: India
- State: Tamil Nadu
- District: Coimbatore

Area
  - Total: 8 km^{2} (3.1 sq mi)

Population (2011)
  - Total: 16,354
  - Density: 2,000/km^{2} (5,300/sq mi)

Languages
  - Official: Tamil
- Time zone: UTC+5:30 (IST)

Zamin Uthukuli is a panchayat town in Coimbatore South taluk of Coimbatore district in the Indian state of Tamil Nadu. Located in the western part of the state, it is one of the 33 panchayat towns in the district. Spread across an area of 8 km^{2} (3.1 sq mi), it had a population of 16,354 individuals as per the 2011 census.

== Geography and administration ==
Zamin Uthukuli is located in Pollachi taluk of Coimbatore district in the Indian state of Tamil Nadu. It is one of the 33 panchayat towns in the district. Spread across an area of 8 km^{2} (3.1 sq mi), it is located in the western part of the state.

The town panchayat is headed by a chairperson, who is elected by the members, who are chosen through direct elections. The town forms part of the Pollachi Assembly constituency that elects its member to the Tamil Nadu legislative assembly and the Pollachi Lok Sabha constituency that elects its member to the Parliament of India.

== Demographics ==
As per the 2011 census, Zamin Uthukuli had a population of 16,354 individuals across 4,566 households. The population saw a marginal increase compared to the previous census in 2001 when 14,859 inhabitants were registered. The population consisted of 8,144 males and 8,210 females. About 1,447 individuals were below the age of six years. About 18.7% of the population belonged to scheduled castes. The entire population is classified as urban. The town has an average literacy rate of 81.1%.

About 48.1% of the eligible population were employed, of which majority were involved in agriculture and allied activities. Hinduism was the majority religion which was followed by 90.1% of the population, with Islam (7.3%) and Christianity (2.6%) being minor religions.
