= Suleeswaranpatti =

- Panchayat town
- Location in Tamil Nadu, India
- Coordinates: 10°38′22″N 77°00′27″E
- Country: India
- State: Tamil Nadu
- District: Coimbatore

Area
  - Total: 5.5 km^{2} (2.1 sq mi)

Population (2011)
  - Total: 20,104
  - Density: 3,700/km^{2} (9,500/sq mi)

Languages
  - Official: Tamil
- Time zone: UTC+5:30 (IST)

Suleeswaranpatti is a panchayat town in Pollachi taluk of Coimbatore district in the Indian state of Tamil Nadu. Located in the western part of the state along the road connecting Pollachi and Valparai, it is one of the 33 panchayat towns in the district. Spread across an area of 5.5 km^{2} (2.1 sq mi), it had a population of 20,104 individuals as per the 2011 census.

== Geography and administration ==
Suleeswaranpatti is located in Pollachi taluk of Coimbatore district in the Indian state of Tamil Nadu. It is one of the 33 panchayat towns in the district. Spread across an area of 5.5 km^{2} (2.1 sq mi), it is located off the highway connecting Pollachi and Valparai in the western part of the state.

The town panchayat is headed by a chairperson, who is elected by the members, who are chosen through direct elections. The town forms part of the Udumalaipettai Assembly constituency that elects its member to the Tamil Nadu legislative assembly and the Pollachi Lok Sabha constituency that elects its member to the Parliament of India.

== Demographics ==
As per the 2011 census, Suleeswaranpatti had a population of 20,104 individuals across 5,680 households. The population saw a marginal increase compared to the previous census in 2001 when 18,211 inhabitants were registered. The population consisted of 10,039 males and 10,065 females. About 1,892 individuals were below the age of six years. The entire population is classified as urban. The town has an average literacy rate of 83.9%. About 13.4% of the population belonged to scheduled castes.

About 46.1% of the eligible population were employed, of which majority were involved in agriculture and allied activities. Hinduism was the majority religion which was followed by 76.5% of the population, with Islam (17.8%) and Christianity (5.6%) being minor religions.
