= Samathur =

- Panchayat town
- Location in Tamil Nadu, India
- Coordinates: 10°36′N 77°01′E
- Country: India
- State: Tamil Nadu
- District: Coimbatore

Area
  - Total: 20 km^{2} (7.7 sq mi)

Population (2011)
  - Total: 5,762
  - Density: 290/km^{2} (750/sq mi)

Languages
  - Official: Tamil
- Time zone: UTC+5:30 (IST)

Samathur is a panchayat town in Anaimalai taluk of Coimbatore district in the Indian state of Tamil Nadu. Located in the north-western part of the state, it is one of the 33 panchayat towns in the district. Spread across an area of 20 km^{2} (7.7 sq mi), it had a population of 5,762 individuals as per the 2011 census.

== Geography and administration ==
Samathur is located in Anaimalai taluk of Coimbatore district in the Indian state of Tamil Nadu. Spread across an area of 20 km^{2} (7.7 sq mi), it is located in the western part of the state. It is one of the 33 panchayat towns in the district. The region has a tropical climate with hot summers and mild winters. The highest temperatures are recorded in April and May, with lowest recordings in December-January.

The town panchayat is headed by a chairperson, who is elected by the members, who are chosen through direct elections. The town forms part of the Valparai Assembly constituency that elects its member to the Tamil Nadu legislative assembly and the Pollachi Lok Sabha constituency that elects its member to the Parliament of India.

== Demographics ==
As per the 2011 census, Samathur had a population of 5,762 individuals across 1,735 households. The population saw a marginal decrease compared to the previous census in 2001 when 5,812 inhabitants were registered. The population consisted of 2,846 males and 2,916 females. About 415 individuals were below the age of six years. The entire population is classified as urban. The town has an average literacy rate of 78.8%. About 16.9% of the population belonged to scheduled castes.

About 52.3% of the eligible population were employed, of which majority were involved in agriculture and allied activities. Cattle fairs and markets are conducted in the panchyat. Hinduism was the majority religion which was followed by 97.9% of the population, with Christianity (1.3%) and Islam (0.7%) being minor religions.
