= Othakalmandapam =

Othakkalmandapam
- Panchayat town
- Location in Tamil Nadu, India
- Coordinates: 10°53′53″N 77°00′17″E
- Country: India
- State: Tamil Nadu
- District: Coimbatore

Area
  - Total: 13.6 km^{2} (5.3 sq mi)

Population (2011)
  - Total: 12,207
  - Density: 898/km^{2} (2,320/sq mi)

Languages
  - Official: Tamil
- Time zone: UTC+5:30 (IST)

Othakkalmandapam is a panchayat town in Madukkarai taluk of Coimbatore district in the Indian state of Tamil Nadu. Located in the north-western part of the state, it is one of the 33 panchayat towns in the district. Spread across an area of 13.6 km^{2} (5.3 sq mi), it had a population of 12,207 individuals as per the 2011 census.

== Geography and administration ==
Othakkalmandapam is located in Madukkarai taluk of Coimbatore district in the Indian state of Tamil Nadu. Spread across an area of 13.6 km^{2} (5.3 sq mi), it is located in the western part of the state. It is located about 16 km (9.9 mi) from Coimbatore, along the arterial road connecting to Pollachi. It is one of the 33 panchayat towns in the district.

The town panchayat is headed by a chairperson, who is elected by the members, who are chosen through direct elections. The town forms part of the Kinathukadavu Assembly constituency that elects its member to the Tamil Nadu legislative assembly and the Pollachi Lok Sabha constituency that elects its member to the Parliament of India.

== Demographics ==
As per the 2011 census, Othakkalmandapam had a population of 12,207 individuals across 3,394 households. The population saw a marginal increase compared to the previous census in 2001 when 10,320 inhabitants were registered. The population consisted of 6,028 males and 6,179 females. About 1,087 individuals were below the age of six years. The entire population is classified as urban. The town has an average literacy rate of 82.1%. About 12.1% of the population belonged to scheduled castes.

About 41.1% of the eligible population were employed, of which majority were involved in agriculture and allied activities. Hinduism was the majority religion which was followed by 96.6% of the population, with Christianity (2.8%) and Islam (0.3%) being minor religions.
