= Odaiyakulam =

- Panchayat town
- Location in Tamil Nadu, India
- Coordinates: 10°35′35″N 76°54′21″E
- Country: India
- State: Tamil Nadu
- District: Coimbatore

Area
  - Total: 23 km^{2} (8.9 sq mi)

Population (2011)
  - Total: 13,370
  - Density: 580/km^{2} (1,500/sq mi)

Languages
  - Official: Tamil
- Time zone: UTC+5:30 (IST)

Odaiyakulam is a panchayat town in Pollachi taluk of Coimbatore district in the Indian state of Tamil Nadu. Located in the north-western part of the state, it is one of the 33 panchayat towns in the district. Spread across an area of 23 km^{2} (8.9 sq mi), it had a population of 13,370 individuals as per the 2011 census.

== Geography and administration ==
Odaiyakulam is located in Pollachi taluk of Coimbatore district in the Indian state of Tamil Nadu. Spread across an area of 23 km^{2} (8.9 sq mi), it is located in the western part of the state. It is one of the 33 panchayat towns in the district.

The town panchayat is headed by a chairperson, who is elected by the members, who are chosen through direct elections. The town forms part of the Valparai Assembly constituency that elects its member to the Tamil Nadu legislative assembly and the Pollachi Lok Sabha constituency that elects its member to the Parliament of India.

== Demographics ==
As per the 2011 census, Odaiyakulam had a population of 13,370 individuals across 3,895 households. The population saw a marginal increase compared to the previous census in 2001 when 11,999 inhabitants were registered. The population consisted of 6,584 males and 6,786 females. About 1,058 individuals were below the age of six years. The entire population is classified as urban. The town has an average literacy rate of 78.5%. About 28.5% of the population belonged to scheduled castes.

About 52.4% of the eligible population were employed, of which majority were involved in agriculture and allied activities. Hinduism was the majority religion which was followed by 98.2% of the population, with Christianity (1.0%) and Islam (0.8%) being minor religions.
