= Sarcarsamakulam =

- Panchayat town
- Location in Tamil Nadu, India
- Coordinates: 11.135287°N 77.03433°E
- Country: India
- State: Tamil Nadu
- District: Coimbatore

Area
  - Total: 10.5 km^{2} (4.1 sq mi)

Population (2011)
  - Total: 10,289
  - Density: 980/km^{2} (2,540/sq mi)

Languages
  - Official: Tamil
- Time zone: UTC+5:30 (IST)

Sarcarsamakulam is a panchayat town in Annur taluk of Coimbatore district in the Indian state of Tamil Nadu. Located in the north-western part of the state, it is one of the 33 panchayat towns in the district. Spread across an area of 10.5 km^{2} (4.1 sq mi), it had a population of 10,289 individuals as per the 2011 census.

== Geography and administration ==
Sarcarsamakulam is located in Annur taluk of Coimbatore district in the Indian state of Tamil Nadu. Spread across an area of 10.5 km^{2} (4.1 sq mi), it is located in the western part of the state. It is one of the 33 panchayat towns in the district.

The town panchayat is headed by a chairperson, who is elected by the members, who are chosen through direct elections. The town forms part of the Kavundampalayam Assembly constituency that elects its member to the Tamil Nadu legislative assembly and the Coimbatore Lok Sabha constituency that elects its member to the Parliament of India.

== Demographics ==
As per the 2011 census, Sarcarsamakulam had a population of 10,289 individuals across 2,915 households. The population saw a marginal increase compared to the previous census in 2001 when 7,982 inhabitants were registered. The population consisted of 5,122 males and 5,167 females. About 966 individuals were below the age of six years. The entire population is classified as urban. The town has an average literacy rate of 86.3%. About 20.6% of the population belonged to scheduled castes.

About 38.6% of the eligible population were employed, of which majority were involved in agriculture and allied activities. Hinduism was the majority religion which was followed by 94.1% of the population, with Christianity (3.8%) and Islam (1.8%) being minor religions. The Kaalakaleshwara Temple, built in 13th century CE, and dedicated to Shiva, is a major Hindu pilgrimage site. The history of the temple is related to the mythology of Markendeya.
