= Pollachi division =

Pollachi division is a revenue division in the Coimbatore district of Tamil Nadu, India. According To 2011 Census of India The estimated area Of Pollachi Division is 2089Sqkm.The pollachi Division Has Two Taluks Namely Pollachi Taluk, Valparai Taluk.
