= Sarcarsamakulam Block =

Sarcarsamakulam block is a revenue block of Coimbatore district of the Indian state of Tamil Nadu. This revenue block consist of 8 panchayat villages.

== List of Panchayat Villages ==
They are,

| SI.No | Panchayat Village |
|---|---|
| 1 | A.S.Kulam |
| 2 | Athipalayam |
| 3 | Kallipalayam |
| 4 | Keeranatham |
| 5 | Kondayampalayam |
| 6 | Vellamadai |
| 7 | Vellanaipatti |
