= Vettaikaranpudur =

- Panchayat town
- Location in Tamil Nadu, India
- Coordinates: 10.5667°N 76.9333°E
- Country: India
- State: Tamil Nadu
- District: Coimbatore

Area
  - Total: 51 km^{2} (20 sq mi)

Population (2011)
  - Total: 17,392
  - Density: 340/km^{2} (880/sq mi)

Languages
  - Official: Tamil
- Time zone: UTC+5:30 (IST)

Vettaikaranpudur is a panchayat town in Anaimalai taluk of Coimbatore district in the Indian state of Tamil Nadu. Located in the western part of the state, it is one of the 33 panchayat towns in the district. Spread across an area of 51 km^{2} (20 sq mi), it had a population of 17,392 individuals as per the 2011 census.

== Geography and administration ==
Vettaikaranpudur is located in Anaimalai taluk of Coimbatore district in the Indian state of Tamil Nadu. It is one of the 33 panchayat towns in the district. Spread across an area of 51 km^{2} (20 sq mi), it is located in the foothills of the Western Ghats in the western part of the state. Majority of the town forms a part of the Anaimalai Tiger Reserve.

The town panchayat is headed by a chairperson, who is elected by the members representing each of the 18 wards in the panchayat. The members are chosen through direct elections. The town forms part of the Valparai Assembly constituency that elects its member to the Tamil Nadu legislative assembly and the Pollachi Lok Sabha constituency that elects its member to the Parliament of India.

== Demographics ==
As per the 2011 census, Vettaikaranpudur had a population of 17,392 individuals across 5,152 households. The population saw a marginal decrease compared to the previous census in 2001 when 18,360 inhabitants were registered. The population consisted of 8,553 males and 8,839 females. About 1,536individuals were below the age of six years. About 19.2% of the population belonged to scheduled castes and 9.8% belonged to scheduled tribes. The entire population is classified as urban. The town has an average literacy rate of 67.2%.

About 57.7% of the eligible population were employed, of which majority were involved in agriculture and allied activities. Hinduism was the majority religion which was followed by 96.1% of the population, with Christianity (1.0%) and Islam (2.9%) being minor religions.
