= Kinathukadavu Block =

Coordinates: 10.82°N 77.02°E

Kinathukadavu block is a revenue block of Coimbatore district of the Indian state of Tamil Nadu. This revenue block consist of 34 panchayat villages.

== List of Panchayat Villages ==
They are,

SI.No	Panchayat Village
1	A.Muthur
2	Andipalayam
3	Arasampalayam
4	Chettikkapalayam
5	Devanampalayam
6	Devarayapuram
7	Govindapuram
8	Kakkadavu
9	Kaniyalamplm
10	Kappalankarai
11	Kattampatti
12	Kodangipalayam
13	Kondampatti
14	Kothavadi
15	Kovilpalayam
16	Kulathupalayam
17	Kurunellipalayam
18	Kuthiriyalamplm
19	Mandrampalayam
20	Mettubavi
21	Mettupalayam
22	Mullupadi
23	Nallattipalayam
24	Panapatti
25	Periakalandai
26	Pottayandipurambu
27	Sirukalandai
28	Sokkanur
29	Solanur
30	Solavampalayam
31	Sulakkal
32	Vadapudur
33	Vadasithur
34	Varadanur

== Villages ==
[sangarayapuram
