= Annur taluk =

Coordinates: 10.97°N 76.9°E

Annur
- Taluk
- Interactive map of Annur
- Country: India
- State: Tamil Nadu
- District: Coimbatore

Area
  - Total: 388.53 km^{2} (150.01 sq mi)

Annur taluk is a taluk in Coimbatore district, Tamil Nadu, India, associated with the town of Annur. It was carved out of the Coimbatore-North taluk in 2012. The taluk is spread over an area of 388.53 square kilometres (150.01 sq mi) and had a population of 1,73,712 in 2011.
