= Thondamuthur Block =

Coordinates: 11°00′35″N 76°49′41″E

Thondamuthur block is a revenue block of Coimbatore district of the Indian state of Tamil Nadu. This revenue block consist of 10 panchayat villages.

== List of Panchayat Villages ==
They are,

SI.No	Panchayat Village
1	Devarayapuram
2	Ikkarai Boluvampatti
3	Jagirnaickenplm
4	Madampatti
5	Madvarayapuram
6	Narasipuram
7	P.C.Palayam
8	Theethipalayam
9	Thennamanallur
10	Vellimalaipatinam
