= Valparai taluk =

Coordinates: 10.327556°N 76.955271°E

Valparai
- Taluk
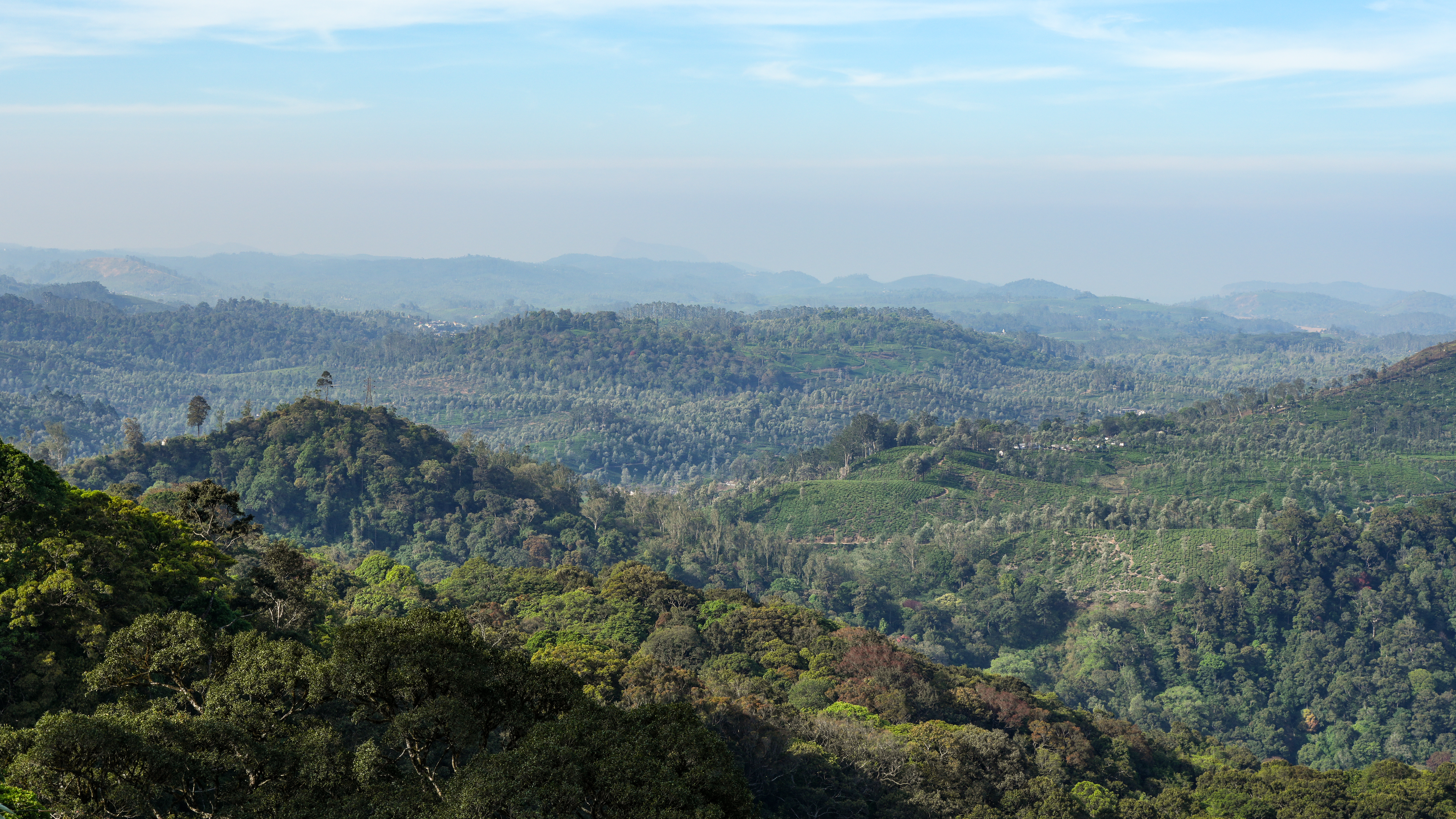
- Forests and tea plantations carpet Valparai hills
- Interactive map of Valparai
- Country: India
- State: Tamil Nadu
- District: Coimbatore

Valparai taluk is a taluk of Coimbatore district of the Indian state of Tamil Nadu. The headquarters is the town of Valparai. Anaimalai Hills Village is the only revenue villages under this revenue.

== Demographics ==
According to the 2011 census, the taluk of Valparai had a population of 70,771 with 35,270 males and 35,501 females. There were 1,007 women for every 1,000 men. The taluk had a literacy rate of 79.07%. Child population in the age group below 6 years were 2,227 Males and 2,135 Females.
