= Coimbatore division =

Revenue division in Tamil Nadu, India

Coimbatore division is a revenue division in the Coimbatore district of Tamil Nadu, India. It includes five talukas: Coimbatore North, Coimbatore South, Mettupalayam, Sulur, and Annur. The area of Coimbatore Division is 2,356 km^{2} and the estimated population is 27,67,189.
