= Thondamuthur =

- Panchayat town
- Location in Tamil Nadu, India
- Coordinates: 10.9899°N 76.8409°E
- Country: India
- State: Tamil Nadu
- District: Coimbatore

Area
  - Total: 29.58 km^{2} (11.42 sq mi)

Population (2011)
  - Total: 11,492
  - Density: 388.5/km^{2} (1,006/sq mi)

Languages
  - Official: Tamil
- Time zone: UTC+5:30 (IST)

Thondamuthur is a panchayat town in Perur taluk of Coimbatore district in the Indian state of Tamil Nadu. Located in the western part of the state, it is one of the 33 panchayat towns in the district. Spread across an area of 29.58 km^{2} (11.42 sq mi), it had a population of 11,492 individuals as per the 2011 census.

== Geography and administration ==
Thondamuthur is located in Perur taluk of Coimbatore district in the Indian state of Tamil Nadu. It is one of the 33 panchayat towns in the district. Spread across an area of 29.58 km^{2} (11.42 sq mi), it is located in the western part of the state.

Thondamuthur is administrative headquarters of Thondamuthur Panchayat union which consists of ten villages. The town panchayat is headed by a chairperson, who is elected by the members representing each of the 15 wards. The members themselves are chosen through direct elections. The town forms part of the Thondamuthur Assembly constituency that elects its member to the Tamil Nadu legislative assembly and the Pollachi Lok Sabha constituency that elects its member to the Parliament of India.

== Demographics ==
As per the 2011 census, Thondamuthur had a population of 11,492 individuals across 3,320 households. The population saw a marginal increase compared to the previous census in 2001 when 9,340inhabitants were registered. The population consisted of 5,572 males and 5,920 females. About 1,051 individuals were below the age of six years. About 19.8% of the population belonged to scheduled castes and 1.7% belonged to scheduled tribes. The entire population is classified as urban. The town has an average literacy rate of 78.2%.

About 48.5% of the eligible population were employed, of which majority were involved in agriculture and allied activities. Hinduism was the majority religion which was followed by 95.3% of the population, with Christianity (1.4%) and Islam (3.2%) being minor religions.
