= Madukkarai Block =

Coordinates: 10.913°N 76.952°E

Madukkarai block is a revenue block of Coimbatore district of the Indian state of Tamil Nadu. This revenue block consist of 9 panchayat villages.

== List of Panchayat Villages ==
They are,

SI.No	Panchayat Village
1	Arisipalayam
2	Malumichampatti
3	Mavuthampathy
4	Myleripalayam
5	Nachipalayam
6	Palathurai
7	Pichanur
8	Seerapalayam
9	Valukkuparai
