= Madukkarai =

Suburb in Coimbatore, Tamil Nadu, India

Madhukkarai
- Suburb
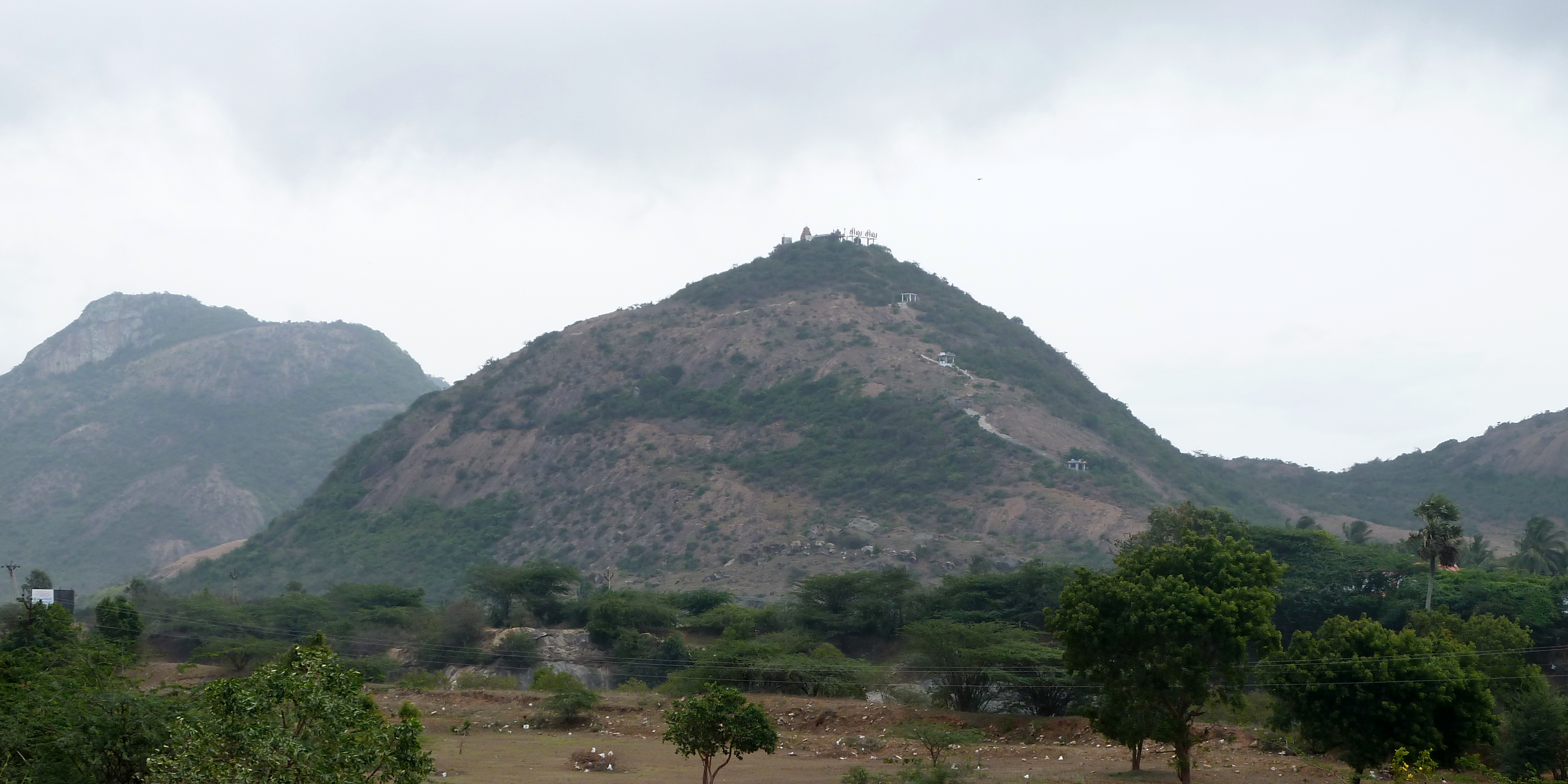
- Dharmalingeshwarar Temple atop a hillock

- Location in Tamil Nadu, India
- Coordinates: 10.913°N 76.952°E
- Country: India
- State: Tamil Nadu
- Region: Kongu Nadu
- District: Coimbatore
- Taluk: Madukkarai

Area
  - Total: 21.47 km^{2} (8.29 sq mi)
- Elevation: 311 m (1,020 ft)

Population (2011)
  - Total: 30,357
  - Density: 1,414/km^{2} (3,662/sq mi)

Languages
  - Official: Tamil
- Time zone: UTC+5:30 (IST)
- Postal code: 641105
- Vehicle registration: TN-99

Madukkarai is a municipality in Coimbatore district in the Indian state of Tamil Nadu. It is the headquarters of Madukkarai taluk. It was a panchayat town till 2021, when it was upgraded to a municipality. Spread across an area of 21.47 km^{2} (8.29 sq mi), it had a population of 30,357 individuals as per the 2011 census.

== Etymology and history ==
Madukkarai means "a place with many mango trees" in Tamil, the dominant language of Tamil Nadu. The name is derived from "madhu", meaning honey or sweet, and "karai", meaning bank or shore, suggesting a fertile and abundant area, possibly near a water body, known for its sweet mangoes.

Historically, the region has been an agricultural hub, with mango cultivation being a significant economic activity. The town is known for its cement industries, which have contributed to its industrial development.

== Geography ==
Madukkarai is a municipality in Coimbatore district in the Indian state of Tamil Nadu. It was a panchayat town till 2021, when it was upgraded to a municipality. It is the administrative center of Madukkarai taluk. Spread across an area of 21.68 km^{2} (8.37 sq mi), it is located in the western part of the state. It is located off the arterial road connecting Coimbatore to National Highway 544. The region has a tropical climate with hot summers and mild winters. The highest temperatures are recorded in April and May, with lowest recordings in December–January.

The municipality is headed by a chairperson, who is elected by the members, who are chosen through direct elections. The town forms part of the Kinathukadavu Assembly constituency that elects its member to the Tamil Nadu legislative assembly and the Pollachi Lok Sabha constituency that elects its member to the Parliament of India.

== Demographics ==
As per the 2011 census, Madukkarai had a population of 30,357 individuals across 8,153 households. The population saw a marginal increase compared to the previous census in 2001 when 26,441 inhabitants were registered. The population consisted of 15,084 males and 15,273 females. About 3,049 individuals were below the age of six years. The entire population is classified as urban. The town has an average literacy rate of 84.3%. About 15.3% of the population belonged to scheduled castes.

About 41.7% of the eligible population were employed, of which majority were involved in agriculture and allied activities. Hinduism was the majority religion which was followed by 82.5% of the population, with Christianity (6.9%) and Islam (9.8%) being minor religions.

== See also ==
Kurumbapalayam (Madukkarai)
