= Anaimalai taluk =

Coordinates: 10.97°N 76.9°E

Anaimalai taluk is a taluk in Coimbatore district, Tamil Nadu, India. It was carved out of the Pollachi taluk in 2018. The taluk is spread over an area of 368.13 square kilometres (142.14 sq mi) and had a population of 1,72,164 according to the 2011 Census.
