= Perur taluk =

Taluk in Coimbatore, Tamil Nadu, India

Coordinates: 10.97°N 76.9°E

Perur
- Taluk
- Interactive map of Perur
- Country: India
- State: Tamil Nadu
- District: Coimbatore

Perur taluk is a taluk in Coimbatore district, Tamil Nadu, India associated with the neighbourhood of Perur in the city of Coimbatore. It was created by Government of Tamil Nadu in 2013. The taluk had a population of 393,350 according to the 2011 Census.
