= Coimbatore-North taluk =

Taluk in Tamil Nadu, India

Coimbatore (North)
- Taluk
- Country: India
- State: Tamil Nadu
- District: Coimbatore

Coimbatore (North) taluk is a taluk of Coimbatore City of the Indian state of Tamil Nadu. On 9 May 2012, Government of Tamil Nadu announced that it will bifurcate Coimbatore North Taluk to create the new Annur Taluk.

== Demographics ==
According to the 2011 census, the taluk of Coimbatore (North) had a population of 641,021 with 321,922 males and 319,099 females. There were 991 women for every 1,000 men. The taluk had a literacy rate of 76.37%. Child population in the age group below 6 years were 28,302 Males and 27,219 Females.
