= Madukkarai taluk =

Taluk in Coimbatore district, Tamil Nadu, India

Coordinates: 10.913°N 76.952°E

Madukkarai
- Taluk
- Interactive map of Madukkarai
- Country: India
- State: Tamil Nadu
- District: Coimbatore

Madukkarai taluk is a taluk in Coimbatore district, Tamil Nadu, India. It was created by Government of Tamil Nadu in 2013. According to the 2011 Census, it had a population of 343,763.
