= Pollachi taluk =

Coordinates: 10.659°N 77.008°E

Pollachi
- Taluk
- Interactive map of Pollachi
- Country: India
- State: Tamil Nadu
- District: Coimbatore

Pollachi taluk is a taluk of Coimbatore rural district of the Indian state of Tamil Nadu. The headquarters is the town of Pollachi.

== Demographics ==
According to the 2011 census, the taluk of Pollachi had a population of 575,478 with 285,553 males and 289,925 females. There were 1015 women for every 1000 men. The taluk had a literacy rate of 70.65. Child population in the age group below 6 was 22,399 Males and 21,464 Females.
