= Coimbatore metropolitan area =

Greater Coimbatore Coimbatore Metropolitan Area
- Metropolitan area
- Nickname: Manchester of South India
- Country: India
- State: Tamil Nadu
- Planning Authority: Coimbatore Urban Development Authority (CUDA)
- Parliament constituencies: Coimbatore; Pollachi; Nilgiris
- Assembly constituencies: Coimbatore North; Coimbatore South; Singanallur; Kavundampalayam; Thondamuthur; Sulur; Kinathukadavu; Mettupalayam
- Jurisdiction: Municipal corporations - 1; Municipalities - 4; Town Panchayats - 21; Revenue Villages - 66
- Seat: Coimbatore
- Districts: parts of Coimbatore district

Government
  - Type: Municipal Corporation
  - Body: CCMC

Area
  - Metropolitan area: 1,531.57 km^{2} (591.34 sq mi)

Population
  - Metro: 2,457,452
- Demonym: Coimbatorian
- Time zone: UTC+5:30 (IST)
- PIN: 641XXX
- STD Code: +91-0422
- Vehicle registration: TN-37 (South), TN-38 (North), TN-66 (Central), TN-99 (West) & TN-37Z (Sulur).
- Website: www.ccmc.gov.in www.coimbatorelpa.com

The Greater Coimbatore, or Coimbatore Metropolitan Area, is the sixteenth-most populous metropolitan area in India, the second most populous metropolitan area in the state of Tamil Nadu next only to Chennai. The Coimbatore Metropolitan Area consists of the city of Coimbatore and its suburbs in Coimbatore district.

== Economy ==
The economy of the metropolitan area of Coimbatore is heavily influenced by information technology, engineering and textiles at recent times. The city has four special economic zones (SEZ), namely, ELCOT SEZ, CHIL SEZ, SPAN Venture SEZ, Aspen SEZ and at least five more SEZs are in the pipeline. Coimbatore has trade associations like CODISSIA, COINDIA and COJEWEL representing industries in the city. The Government of Tamil Nadu has proposed for setting up an Industrial park at Sulur. Coimbatore also has Engineering SEZ in the outskirts of city "Aspen SEZ" spread over 376 acres. CODISSIA Industrial Park is being set up at Moperipalayam nearly 260 acres and at Kallapalayam nearly 150 acres. The city already has industrial estates owned by SIDCO at Kurichi, SIDCO at Malumichampatti, Electrical & Electronics Industrial Estate at Kalapatti and Sree Suba Ganesh Industrial estate near Kovilpalayam. The large number of engineering colleges in the region producing about 50,000 engineers. Indian Railways has "Southern Railway Signal & Telecom Workshop" in Podanur which is a manufacturing unit for Electrical & Communication division of Indian Railways. "L&T - MBDA Missile Systems" is a joint venture setting up a new unit in Aspen SEZ, Coimbatore to manufacture defense products. Coimbatore urban agglomeration has more than 700 wet grinder manufacturers with a monthly output, As of 2015, of 75,000 units per every 100,000 produced in India. The term "Coimbatore Wet Grinder" was given a Geographical indication for wet grinders manufactured in Coimbatore in 2006. Coimbatore is also home to a common facility for the manufacturers of wet grinders.

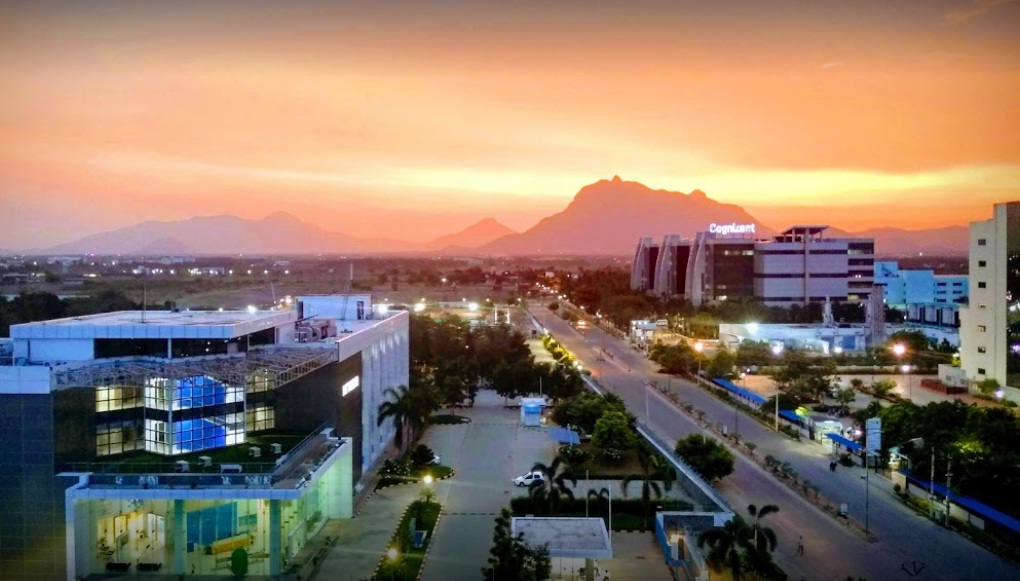
IT SEZ at Saravanampatti

The city is the second largest software producer in Tamil Nadu, next only to Chennai. IT and BPO industry in the city has grown greatly with the launch of TIDEL Park Coimbatore & Wipro Software Development Centre in ELCOT SEZ, KCT TechPark, Hanudev Infopark, Rathinam Technopark, KGISL Campus, Span Venture SEZ, Elysium Central and other planned IT parks in and around the city. It is ranked at 17th among the global outsourcing cities. Companies like Amazon, Altran, Bosch, Cognizant, Ford, Tata Consultancy Services, Wipro, HCL Technologies, Ericsson, Cameron International, NTT DATA, Expleo, Harman, ThoughtWorks, McWane, State Street Corporation, Tessolve, IQVIA, Deloitte, Owler, Access Healthcare, UST Global, Impiger Technologies Pvt. Ltd, Pactron India Pvt Ltd and Nous Infosystems having a presence in the city. Cognizant has second largest headcount in the country with more than 15000+ employees in the city. And Bosch has the second largest development center in Coimbatore outside Germany with 5500+ employees in the city. Software export stood more than ₹15,000 crores for the financial year 2018–2019, which is second largest in the state after Chennai. TICEL Bio-Park III, a Bio-Technology Park is being constructed in 10 acres of land at Somayampalayam, Coimbatore which is set to open in Jan-2020 Due to huge demand from IT Companies for space at Coimbatore, TIDEL Park Coimbatore-Phase-II is planned to be built within ELCOT SEZ in additional 6 acres of land with 5 Lakh sq.feet space at 250 crores.

== List ==
Former Suburbs incorporated into Coimbatore Municipal Corporation (2011 Census)
Sl. No.	Name	Governing Type	Population
1	Coimbatore	Municipal Corporation	1,050,721
2	Chinnavedampatti	Town Panchayat	20,122
3	Goundampalayam	Municipality	83,908
4	Kalapatti	Town Panchayat	39,586
5	Kuniyamuthur	Municipality	95,924
6	Kurichi	Municipality	123,667
7	Saravanampatti	Town Panchayat	32,920
8	Thudiyalur	Town Panchayat	33,924
9	Vadavalli	Town Panchayat	39,873
10	Veerakeralam	Town Panchayat	23,841
11	Vellakinar	Town Panchayat	15,998
12	Vilankurichi	Census Town	24,235
Total	-	-	1,584,719

Below is the list of towns which comprise the Coimbatore Metropolitan Area.

Coimbatore Metropolitan Area (2011 Census)
Sl. No.	Name	Governing Type	Population	Area (km^{2}.)
1	Kangayampalayam	Census Town	8,251	7.62
2	Arasur, Coimbatore	Census Town	11,510	20.14
3	Ashokapuram, Coimbatore	Census Town	12,993	11.81
4	Chettipalayam	Town Panchayat	10,366	31.86
5	Chinniampalayam	Census Town	8,232	6
6	Dhaliyur	Town Panchayat	11,500	21.41
7	Ettimadai	Town Panchayat	9,352	16.44
8	Gudalur (Coimbatore district)	Municipality	38,859	29.95
9	Idikarai	Town Panchayat	8,686	16.76
10	Irugur	Town Panchayat	25,691	11.655
11	Kaniyur, Coimbatore	Census Town	12,011	18.33
12	Kannampalayam	Town Panchayat	15,868	11.32
13	Karumathampatti	Municipality	35,062	27
14	Kurudampalayam	Census Town	18,749	9
15	Madukkarai	Municipality	30,357	21.47
16	Malumichampatti	Census Town	12,936	15.8
17	Mopperipalayam	Town Panchayat	10,923	15
18	Muthugoundenpudur	Census Town	10,259	17
19	Narasimhanaickenpalayam	Town Panchayat	17,858	6.36
20	Neelambur	Census Town	8,382	9
21	Othakalmandapam	Town Panchayat	12,207	13.6
22	Pallapalayam, Coimbatore	Town Panchayat	11,910	5.61
23	Pattanam, Coimbatore	Census Town	9,196	10.54
24	Periyanaickenpalayam	Town Panchayat	25,930	9.37
25	Perur	Town Panchayat	8,004	6.4
26	Perur Chettipalayam	Census Town	17,809	11.17
27	Pooluvapatti	Town Panchayat	12,853	16.5
28	Sarcarsamakulam	Town Panchayat	10,289	10.05
29	Somayampalayam	Census Town	14,787	13.11
30	Sulur	Town Panchayat	27,909	10.96
31	Thenkarai, Coimbatore	Town Panchayat	7,349	12
32	Thirumalayampalayam	Town Panchayat	12,164	30.65
33	Thondamuthur	Town Panchayat	11,492	29.58
34	Vedapatti	Town Panchayat	11,658	6.2
35	Veerapandi, Coimbatore	Town Panchayat	16,953	12.35
36	Vellalore	Town Panchayat	24,872	16.64
37	Karamadai	Municipality	35166	19.3
38	Marudur	Village Panchayat	9,491	29.14
39	Bilichi	Village Panchayat	10412	27.94
40	Masagoundenchettipalayam	Village Panchayat	9,616	27.36
41	Karegoundenpalayam	Village Panchayat	7,531	21.39
42	Selakkarical	Village Panchayat	6,220	21.23
43	Bogampatti	Village Panchayat	2,415	18.79
44	Appanayakkanpatti	Village Panchayat	3,992	18.74
45	Pichanur	Village Panchayat	6,261	18.72
46	Vellamadai	Village Panchayat	6,874	17.19
47	valukkuparai	Village Panchayat	4,891	16.99
48	vellanaipatti	Village Panchayat	4,636	16.42
49	Pachapalayam	Village Panchayat	2,359	15.59
50	Vadavalli Sulur	Village Panchayat	3,859	15.52
51	Madampatti	Village Panchayat	6,771	15.44
52	Kalangal	Village Panchayat	5,590	15.01
53	Nayakkanpalayam	Village Panchayat	3,008	14.89
55	Sikkarampalayam	Census Town	10242	14.52
56	Kallapalayam	Village Panchayat	3,066	14.41
57	Semmandampalayam	Village Panchayat	5,970	13.93
58	Devarayapuram	Village Panchayat	6,417	13.92
59	Peedampalli	Village Panchayat	3,896	13.60
60	Theethipalayam	Census Town	8,629	13.39
61	Kuppepalayam	Village Panchayat	2,784	13.21
62	Arasampalayam	Village Panchayat	3,818	12.60
63	Panapatti	Village Panchayat	2,635	12.08
64	Kadampadi	Census Town	8,147	12.02
65	22 Nanjundapuram	Census Town	9,355	12.01
66	Idayarpalayam	Village Panchayat	2,251	11.91
67	Seerapalayam	Village Panchayat	5,881	11.88
68	Myleripalayam	Village Panchayat	4,990	11.13
69	Arisipalayam	Village Panchayat	2,400	10.85
70	Kattampatti	Village Panchayat	5,859	10.80
71	Vadaputhur	Village Panchayat	5,176	10.60
72	Kittampalayam	Village Panchayat	4,362	10.41
73	Agraharasamakulam	Village Panchayat	4,144	10.28
74	Pappampatti	Village Panchayat	4,143	10.25
75	Chinna Thadagam	Census Town	8,407	10.20
76	Naranapuram	Village Panchayat	2,111	9.16
77	Kondayampalayam	Village Panchayat	6,636	9.06
78	Kunnathur	Village Panchayat	4,281	9.01
79	Solavampalayam	Village Panchayat	6,387	8.70
80	Thennamanallur	Village Panchayat	5,098	8.54
81	Kariampalayam	Village Panchayat	4,498	8.2
82	Kallipalayam	Village Panchayat	2,821	7.56
83	24 Veerapandi	Village Panchayat	7,528	35.78
84	Pannimadai	Census Town	13785	7.48
85	Pachapalayam	Village Panchayat	2,933	7.32
86	Karavellimadapur	Village Panchayat	5,626	6.79
87	Rasipalayam	Village Panchayat	4,407	5.58
88	Nachipalayam	Village Panchayat	3,008	5.18
89	Pottayandiporambu	Village Panchayat	1,530	5.03
90	Mylampatti	Village Panchayat	2,823	4.81
91	Karunsamikaudampalayam	Village Panchayat	343	4.14
92	Palathurai	Village Panchayat	2,727	3.44
93	Kuthiraiyalampalayam	Village Panchayat	1,448	2.64
94	Thamakavundampalayam	Village Panchayat	482	2.64
95	Coimbatore	M.Corp.	1,584,719	257.04
Total	-	-	24,57,452	1531.57

== Coimbatore Metro ==
The Coimbatore Metro Rail has proposed five corridors to serve the Coimbatore metropolitan area.

== Composition ==
The Coimbatore urban agglomeration is a metropolitan area in Tamil Nadu state, consisting of the city of Coimbatore and its suburbs. It consists of a municipal corporation and suburban areas spread out in parts of Coimbatore district.

== Municipal corporations ==
1. Coimbatore City Municipal Corporation

== Municipalities ==
1. Gudalur (Coimbatore district)
2. Karumathampatti
3. Madukkarai
4. Karamadai

== Town Panchayats ==
1. Irugur
2. Kannampalayam
3. Othakalmandapam
4. Pallapalayam
5. Periyanaickenpalayam
6. Perur
7. Pooluvapatti
8. Sarcarsamakulam
9. Sulur
10. Vedapatti
11. Veerapandi, Coimbatore
12. Vellalore
13. Kinathukadavu
14. Thirumalayampalayam
15. Chettipalayam
16. Mopperipalayam
17. Dhaliyur
18. Ettimadai
19. Thondamuthur
20. Thenkarai
21. Idikarai

== Districts ==
1. Coimbatore district (partial)

== Taluks ==
From Coimbatore district

1. Coimbatore North
2. Coimbatore South
3. Sulur(partial)
4. Perur
5. Madukkarai
6. Kinathukadavu (partial)
7. Annur (partial)
8. Mettupalayam(partial)

== Transport ==
The Regional Transport offices in the Coimbatore metropolitan area are TN-37 (Coimbatore South), TN-38 (Coimbatore North), TN-66 (Coimbatore Central), TN-99 (Coimbatore West) and Unit offices such as TN-37Z (Sulur).

== See also ==
- Chennai metropolitan area
- Madurai metropolitan area
- Salem metropolitan area
- Tiruchirappalli metropolitan area
- List of million-plus urban agglomerations in India
- List of districts in Tamil Nadu by Human Development Index
- List of urban agglomerations in Tamil Nadu
- List of metropolitan areas in India
- Coimbatore Urban Development Authority
