= List of neighbourhoods of Coimbatore =

This is a list of areas and neighbourhoods in Coimbatore by region. The city is divided on the basis of composition into four major parts: North, Central, South and East. Coimbatore east and its surrounding region is primarily a textile and industrial hub. Central Coimbatore is the commercial heart of the city. Coimbatore, is surrounded by the mountains on the west, and the reserve forests on the northern side. The entire western and northern part of the district borders the Western Ghats with the Nilgiri biosphere. A western pass to Kerala, popularly referred to as the Palghat Gap provides its boundary with the metropolitan area limits.

== Central Coimbatore ==
- Townhall
- Selvapuram
- Rathinapuri
- Tatabad
- Sivananda Colony
- Gandhipuram
- Ukkadam
- Kottaimedu
- Ramnagar
- Sukrawarpettai
- R.S Puram
- Saibaba Colony
- Venkatapuram
- Ponnairajapuram
- Race Course
- Gopalapuram
- Sidhapudur
- Avarampalayam

== South Coimbatore ==
- Sundakkamuthur
- Podanur
- Karumbukadai
- Sundarapuram
- Kurichi
- Eachanari
- Chettipalayam
- Vellalore
- Kuniyamuthur
- Sugunapuram
- Kovaipudur
- Sokkampudhur
- Thondamuthur
- Madhampatti
- Kuppanur

== East Coimbatore ==
- Ramnathapuram
- Singanallur
- Puliakulam
- Ondipudur
- Varadarajapuram
- Peelamedu
- Meena Estate
- Udayampalayam
- Nanjundapuram
- Nehru Nagar
- Vilankurichi
- Ganapathy
- Cheranmanagar
- Nallampalayam
- Gandhimanagar
- Chinniampalayam
- Sowripalayam
- G.V Residency
- Uppilipalayam

== West Coimbatore ==
- Perur
- Vadavalli
- Veerakeralam
- Veedapaati
- P.N.Pudur
- Kalveerampalayam

== Suburban Coimbatore ==
The Suburban Coimbatore includes minor places in Tirupur District and around Coimbatore city

== Northern suburbs of Coimbatore ==
- Karamadai
- Periyanaickenpalayam
- Poochiyur
- RAVATHA KOLLANUR

== North-Western Suburbs of Coimbatore ==
- Thadagam
- Maruthamalai
- Pannimadai

== North-Eastern Suburbs of Coimbatore ==
- Saravanampatti
- Kalapatti
- Keeranatham
- Pachapalayam
- Annur
- Ganesapuram
- Kariampalayam
- Kovilpalayam
- Kurumbapalayam

== South-Western Suburbs of Coimbatore ==
- Walayar
- K.G Chavadi
- Ettimadai
- Odaiyakulam
- Thirumalayampalayam

== Eastern Suburbs of Coimbatore ==
- Neelambur
- Somanur
- Karumathampatti
- Irugur
- Sulur

== Western Suburbs of Coimbatore ==
- Thondamuthur
- Pooluvapatti
- Veerakeralam
- Karunya Nagar
- Thenkarai
- Narasipuram
- Puthur
- Alanthurai
- Veddapaati

== Southern Suburbs of Coimbatore ==
- Kinathukadavu
- Myleripalayam
- Nachipalayam
- Malumichampatti
- Othakalmandapam
- Samathur
- Suleeswaranpatti
- Madukkarai
- Annamalai hills
