= Coimbatore Municipal Corporation =

Tamilnadu industrial City and Second Biggest City in Tamilnadu

Coimbatore City Municipal Corporation
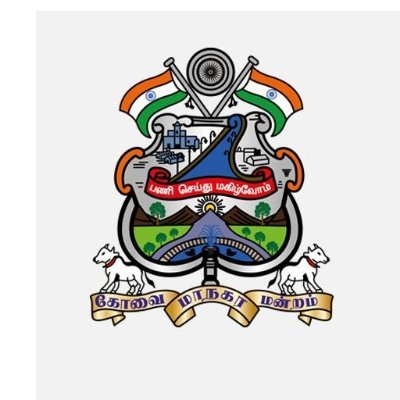

Type
- Type: Municipal corporation

Leadership
- Mayor: R. Ranganayaki, DMK
- Deputy Mayor: R. Vetriselvan, DMK
- Commissioner: Thiru. Katta Ravi Teja, IAS.
- Police Commissioner: A. Saravana Sundar

Structure
- Seats: 100
- Political groups: Government (76) DMK: 76 wards TVK-led Alliance (20) INC: 9 wards CPI: 4 wards CPIM: 4 wards MDMK: 3 wards Other's Opposition (4) AIADMK: 3 wards SDPI: 1 ward

Elections
- Last election: 2022
- Next election: 2027

Meeting place
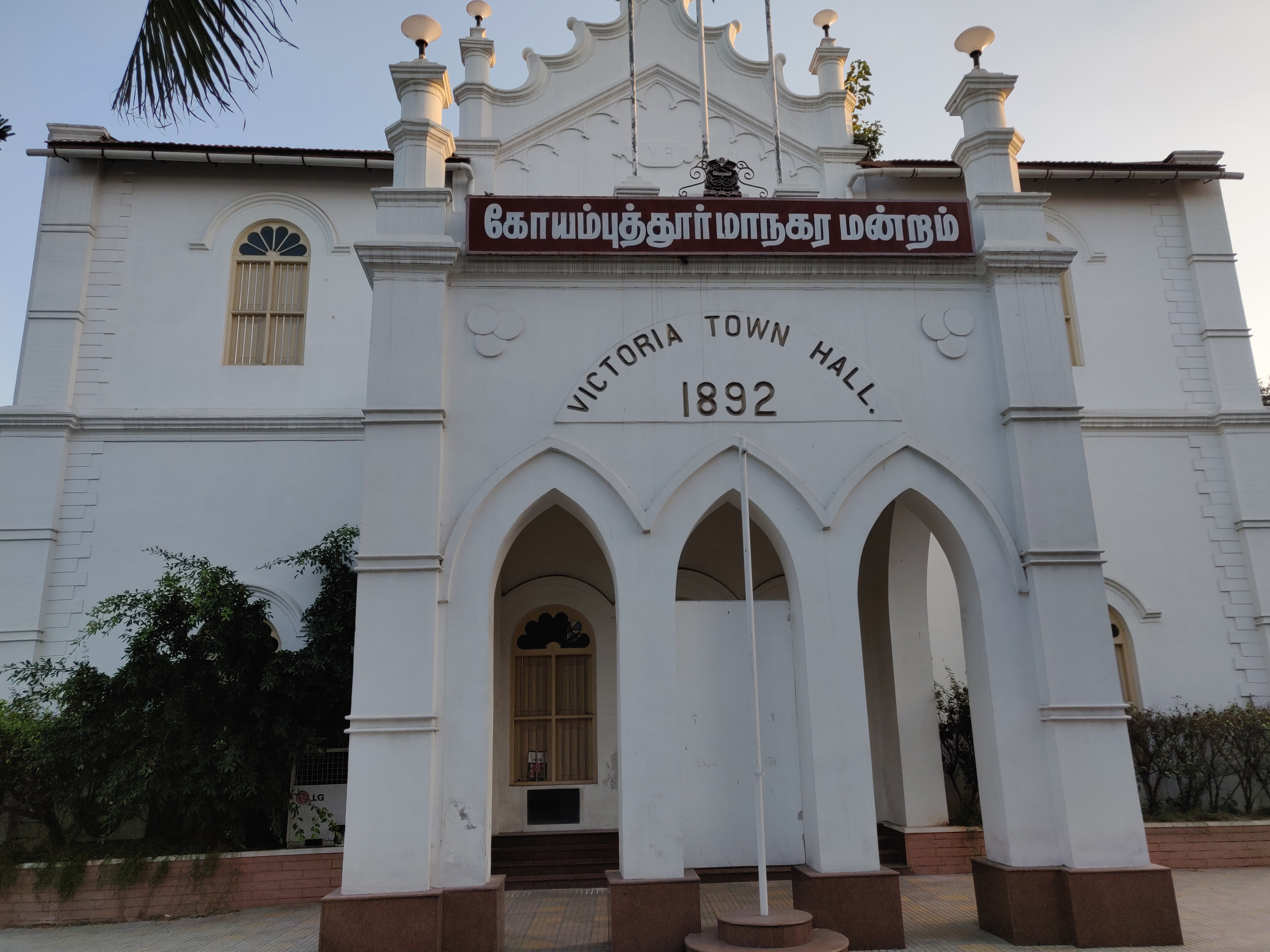
- Town Hall

Website
- www.ccmc.gov.in

The Coimbatore City Municipal Corporation is the civic body that governs the city of Coimbatore in the Indian state of Tamil Nadu. It is the largest municipal corporation in Tamil Nadu with an area of 415 sq km.

== History ==
The municipality of Coimbatore was established in 1866 according to the Town Improvements Act of 1865, with industrialist Sir Robert Stanes as its first Chairman. The early days of the municipality were difficult as it had to tackle plague epidemics and earthquakes. In 1934, the municipality elected its first woman Chairman, K. Thankamma Jacob.Justice Party politician R. K. Shanmukham Chetty served as the Vice-Chairman of the municipality from 1917 to 1920. in 1981, Coimbatore was elevated to a municipal corporation, the third in Tamil Nadu by the merger of Singanallur Municipality with Coimbatore Municipality. In 2011, Coimbatore City Municipal Corporation limits were expanded by merging nearby areas of Coimbatore and making its area from 105 km² to 257.04 km². In 2012, the Corporation won the "Best Corporation Award" from the Government of Tamil Nadu.

== Logo ==
The logo of the Coimbatore City Municipal Corporation includes Indian national flag.

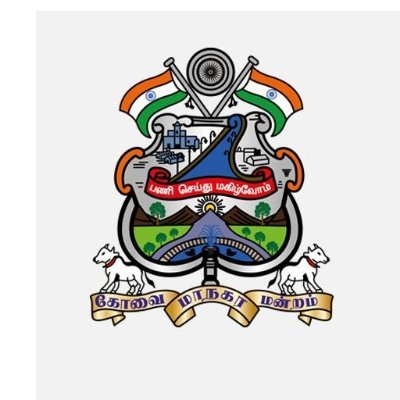
Emblem of Coimbatore City Municipal Corporation

== Area ==
In 2011, three municipalities namely Kuniyamuthur, Kurichi and Kavundampalayam, seven town panchayats namely Saravanampatti, Kalapatti, Vadavalli, Thudiyalur, Veerakeralam, Chinnavedampatti, Vellakinar and Vilankurichi village panchayat were annexed by the Corporation by increasing the size from 105 km.sq. to 257.04 km.sq.

In 2024 there was a proposal by Tamilnadu Government to merge Madukkarai municipality, five town panchayats namely Perur, Vedapatti, Irugur, Vellalore, Pallapalayam and eleven urbanized village panchayats namely Pattanam, Seerapalayam, Perur Chettipalayam, Somayampalayam, Kurudampalayam, Keeranatham, Vellanaipatti, Neelambur, Chinniampalayam, Mylampatti and Kallipalayam with Coimbatore Corporation.

However in January 2025, Tamilnadu Government merged

- Madukkarai municipality,
- four town panchayats
1. Perur,
2. Vedapatti,
3. Irugur,
4. Vellalore and
- eleven urbanized village panchayats namely
1. Sulur Panchayat Union (Neelambur, Mylampatti, Chinniampalayam),
2. Periyanaickenpalayam Panchayat Union (Kurudampalayam, Ashokapuram, Somayampalayam),
3. Sarkarsamakulam Panchayat Union (Keeranatham),
4. Madukkarai Panchayat Union (Seerapalayam and Malumichampatti)

with Coimbatore Corporation to make it the state's largest corporation with an area of 415 sq.km.

== Structure ==
This corporation consists of 100 wards and is headed by a mayor who presides over a deputy mayor and other councillors who represent the wards. The mayor is elected directly through a first past the post voting system and the deputy mayor is elected by the councillors from among their numbers.

=== Wards ===
| Zone | Ward Number | Ward Name | Areas Covered | Assembly Constituency | Councillor | Political Group |
|---|---|---|---|---|---|---|
| | 1 | | | | Karpagam R | DMK |
| | 2 | | | | Pushpamani A | DMK |
| | 3 | | | | Kavitha S | DMK |
| | 4 | | | | Kathirvelusamy R | DMK |
| | 5 | | | | Naveenkumar G | INC |
| | 6 | | | | Ponnusamy S | DMK |
| | 7 | | | | Govindaraj M | DMK |
| | 8 | | | | Vijayakumar K | DMK |
| | 9 | | | | Saraswathi P | DMK |
| | 10 | | | | Kathirvel V | DMK |
| | 11 | | | | Palanisamy (a) Siravai Siva P | DMK |
| | 12 | | | | Ramamoorthy V | CPI(M) |
| | 13 | | | | Sumathi N | CPI(M) |
| | 14 | | | | Chithra T | MDMK |
| | 15 | | | | Santhamani P | INC |
| | 16 | | | | Tamilselvan P | DMK |
| | 17 | | | | Subashree S | DMK |
| | 18 | | | | Radhakrishnan A | DMK |
| | 19 | | | | Kalpana A | DMK |
| | 20 | | | | Mariaraj A | DMK |
| | 21 | | | | Poongodi Somasundaram | DMK |
| | 22 | | | | Kovai Babu Selvakumar M | DMK |
| | 23 | | | | Manian K | DMK |
| | 24 | | | | Boopathi R | CPI(M) |
| | 25 | | | | Thavamani Palaniappan | DMK |
| | 26 | | | | Chithra Vellingiri | MDMK |
| | 27 | | | | Ambika Dhanapal | DMK |
| | 28 | | | | Kannagi Jothibasu | CPI(M) |
| | 29 | | | | Ranganayaki R | DMK |
| | 30 | | | | Saranya S | DMK |
| | 31 | | | | Vairamurugan (a) Murugan R | DMK |
| | 32 | | | | Parthiban R | DMK |
| | 33 | | | | Krishnamoorthy A | DMK |
| | 34 | | | | Malathi N | DMK |
| | 35 | | | | Sambath N | DMK |
| | 36 | | | | Theivanai T | DMK |
| | 37 | | | | Kumutham K | DMK |
| | 38 | | | | Sharmila C | AIADMK |
| | 39 | | | | Lakshmi B | DMK |
| | 40 | | | | Bathmavathi R | DMK |
| | 41 | | | | Santhi C | CPI |
| | 42 | | | | Praveenraj K | DMK |
| | 43 | | | | Mallika P | CPI |
| | 44 | | | | Gayathri R | INC |
| | 45 | | | | Babysutha R | DMK |
| | 46 | | | | Meenalogu L | DMK |
| | 47 | | | | Prabhakaran R | AIADMK |
| | 48 | | | | Prabha Ravindran | CPI |
| | 49 | | | | Annakodi E | DMK |
| | 50 | | | | Geetha C | DMK |
| | 51 | | | | Amsaveni M | DMK |
| | 52 | | | | Lakshmi Ellanselvi Karthick | DMK |
| | 53 | | | | Mohan D | CPI |
| | 54 | | | | Bakkiyam D | DMK |
| | 55 | | | | Dharmaraj T | MDMK |
| | 56 | | | | Krishnamoorthy M | INC |
| | 57 | | | | Santhamani P | DMK |
| | 58 | | | | Sumithra G | DMK |
| | 59 | | | | Deepa Thalapathy Ellango M | DMK |
| | 60 | | | | Siva M | DMK |
| | 61 | | | | Adhi Maheshwari D | DMK |
| | 62 | | | | Revathi Murali | DMK |
| | 63 | | | | Santhi Murugan | DMK |
| | 64 | | | | Jayapradha Devi Srinivasan S | DMK |
| | 65 | | | | Rajeswari M | DMK |
| | 66 | | | | Munniyammal P | DMK |
| | 67 | | | | Vidhya R | DMK |
| | 68 | | | | Kamalavathi Bose | DMK |
| | 69 | | | | Saravanakumar S | INC |
| | 70 | | | | Sarmila Suresh Narayanan | DMK |
| | 71 | | | | Alagu Jayabalan A | INC |
| | 72 | | | | Selvaraj K | DMK |
| | 73 | | | | Santhosh D | DMK |
| | 74 | | | | Sankar S | INC |
| | 75 | | | | Angulakshmi S | DMK |
| | 76 | | | | Rajkumar P | DMK |
| | 77 | | | | Rajalakshmi S | DMK |
| | 78 | | | | Sivasakthi K | DMK |
| | 79 | | | | Vasanthamani P | DMK |
| | 80 | | | | Mariselvan P | DMK |
| | 81 | | | | Manokaran M | DMK |
| | 82 | | | | Mubaseera M | DMK |
| | 83 | | | | Suma V | DMK |
| | 84 | | | | Alima Begum R | SDPI |
| | 85 | | | | Sarala V | INC |
| | 86 | | | | Ahamed Kabir E | DMK |
| | 87 | | | | Babu P | DMK |
| | 88 | | | | Senthil Kumar P | DMK |
| | 89 | | | | Murugesan K | INC |
| | 90 | | | | Ramesh D | AIADMK |
| | 91 | | | | Rajendran M | DMK |
| | 92 | | | | Vetriselvan R | DMK |
| | 93 | | | | Ellansekaran P | DMK |
| | 94 | | | | Dhanalakshmi R | DMK |
| | 95 | | | | Abdul Kathar S | DMK |
| | 96 | | | | Gunasekaran P | DMK |
| | 97 | | | | Selvi Nevedha S | DMK |
| | 98 | | | | Udhayakumar R | DMK |
| | 99 | | | | Aslam Basha M | DMK |
| | 100 | | | | Karthikeyan R | DMK |

== Administration ==
For administrative purpose the Coimbatore City Municipal Corporation is divided into five zones namely North, South, East, West and Central headed by a chairman.

- The North Zone will have Wards 1, 2, 3, 4, 10, 11, 12, 13, 14, 15, 18, 19, 20, 21, 25, 26, 27, 28, 29, 30
- The East Zone will have Wards 5, 6, 7, 8, 9, 22, 23, 24, 50, 51, 52, 53, 54, 55, 56, 57, 58, 59, 60, 61
- The Central Zone will have Wards 31, 32, 46, 47, 48, 49, 62, 63, 64, 65, 66, 67, 68, 69, 70, 80, 81, 82, 83, 84
- The South Zone will have Wards 76, 77, 78, 79, 85, 86, 87, 88, 89, 90, 91, 92, 93, 94, 95, 96, 97, 98, 99, 100
- The West Zone will have Wards 16, 17, 33, 34, 35, 36, 37, 38, 39, 40, 41, 42, 43, 44, 45, 71, 72, 73, 74, 75,

The offices of the respective zones are located at the following locations:

Offices in Coimbatore City Municipal Corporation
| Zone | Location |
|---|---|
| Coimbatore City Municipal Corporation Main Office | Big Bazaar Street, Town Hall |
| North Zone Office | Balasundaram Road, Pappanaickenpalayam |
| East Zone Office | Trichy Road, Singanallur |
| Central Zone Office | Arts College Road, Race Course |
| West Zone Office | Ramachandra Road, R.S.Puram |
| South Zone Office | Palakkad Road, Kuniyamuthur |

== Elections ==
2022 Coimbatore City Municipal Corporation election Ruling Party (96) SPA (96) DMK: 76 wards INC: 9 wards CPI: 4 wards CPIM: 4 wards MDMK: 3 wards Opposition (4) AIADMK: 3 wards SDPI: 1 ward

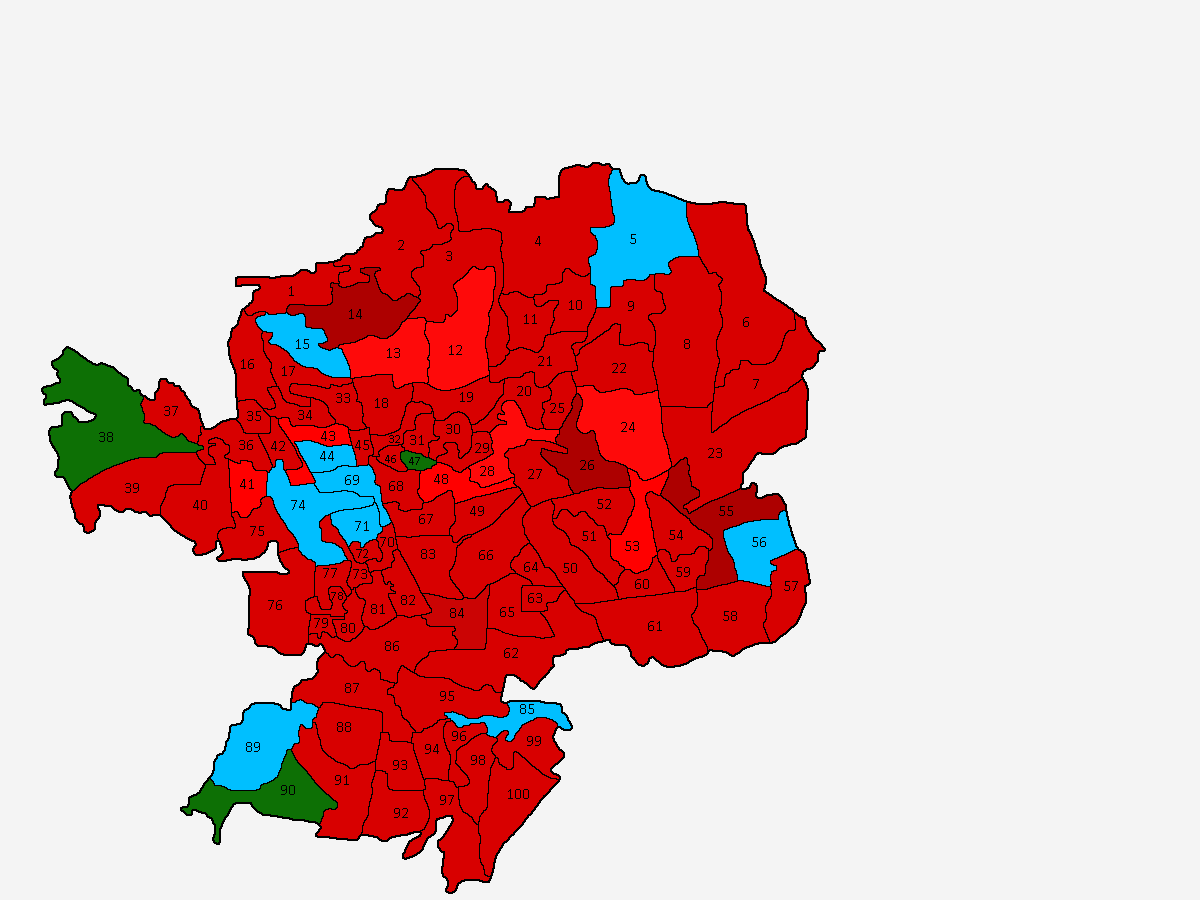
Coimbatore map showing Corporation wards and winning parties

In the 2022 Tamil Nadu urban local body elections, DMK and its allies in the Secular Progressive Alliance, won 96 wards out of total 100 wards for Coimbatore City Municipal Corporation. The DMK won 76 and its allies 20. Among the allies of DMK, Congress won nine, CPI and CPI(M) - four each, and MDMK three wards. The incumbent ruling party in the Coimbtore corporation council, AIADMK won three seats. Social Democratic Party of India won 1 ward.

== Utilities ==
The executive wing of the corporation is headed by a Corporation Commissioner assisted by Deputy Commissioner. The corporation runs and maintains basic services like water, sewage and roads. The district itself is administered by the District Collector.

== Law enforcement ==
The Coimbatore City Police was formed in 1972 after the bifurcation of the existing Coimbatore Police Force to assist in law enforcement. Coimbatore police commissionerate was formed in 1990. The jurisdiction of the Commissionerate of Police extends to the jurisdictional limits of the Coimbatore City Municipal Corporation. In 2011, when the limits of the Municipal Corporation were increased, the jurisdiction of the police was also increased to include newly added areas. There are 18 police stations in Coimbatore City, numbered B - 1 to B - 15 along with three "All-Women" Police stations. The CCP has three wings: traffic, law and order, and crime. Each of these wings comes under four zones: North, South, East and West. The District Court is the highest court of appeal in Coimbatore.
