= Sulur (disambiguation) =

Sulur is a town in Tamil Nadu, India.

Sulur may also refer to:

- Sulur taluk, an administrative unit of Tamil Nadu, India
  - Sulur Block
  - Sulur Assembly constituency
  - Sulur Air Force Station
  - Sulur Road railway station
- Sulur, Karnataka, a village in Kolar district, Karnataka, India
- Súlur, a mountain in Iceland
- Sulur Station, a railway station in Grobogan Regency, Indonesia

== See also ==
- Salur (disambiguation)
- Solor
- Silur
