= Sultanpet Block =

Sultanpet block is a revenue block of Coimbatore district of the Indian state of Tamil Nadu. This revenue block consist of 20 panchayat villages.

== List of Panchayat Villages ==
They are,

SI.No	Panchayat Village
1	Appanaickenpatti
2	Bogampatti
3	Edayarpalayam
4	J.Krishnapuram
5	Jallipatti
6	Kallapalayam
7	Kammalapatti
8	Kumarapalayam
9	Malaipalayam
10	Pachapalayam
11	Pappampatti
12	Poorandampalayam
13	S.Ayyampalayam
14	Selakkarichal
15	Senjeriputhur
16	Thalakkarai
17	Vadambacheri
18	Vadavalli
19	Vadavedampatti
20	Varapatti
