= Sulur Block =

Sulur block is a revenue block of Coimbatore district of the Indian state of Tamil Nadu. This revenue block consist of 17 panchayat villages.

== List of Panchayat Villages ==
They are,

SI.No	Panchayat Village
1	Arasur
2	Chinniyampalayam
3	Kadampadi
4	Kaduvettipalayam
5	Kalangal
6	Kangeyampalayam
7	Kaniyur
8	KaravazhiMadhapur
9	Kittampalayam
10	Muthugoundenpudur
11	Mylampatti
12	Neelambur
13	Paduvampalli
14	Pattanam
15	Peedampalli
16	Rasipalayam
17	Semmandampalayam
