= Dhaliyur =

- Panchayat town
- Location in Tamil Nadu, India
- Coordinates: 11°0′38″N 76°50′58″E
- Country: India
- State: Tamil Nadu
- District: Coimbatore

Area
  - Total: 21.41 km^{2} (8.27 sq mi)

Population (2011)
  - Total: 11,500
  - Density: 537/km^{2} (1,390/sq mi)

Languages
  - Official: Tamil
- Time zone: UTC+5:30 (IST)

Dhaliyur is a panchayat town in Coimbatore South taluk of Coimbatore district in the Indian state of Tamil Nadu. It is located in the north-western part of the state. Spread across an area of 21.41 km^{2} (8.27 sq mi), it had a population of 11,500 individuals as per the 2011 census.

== Geography and administration ==
Dhaliyur is located in Coimbatore South taluk of Coimbatore district in the Indian state of Tamil Nadu. Spread across an area of 21.41 km^{2} (8.27 sq mi), it is one of the 33 panchayat towns in the district. It is located in the western part of the state. The region has a tropical climate with hot summers and mild winters. The highest temperatures are recorded between March and May, with the average lowest recordings between December and February.

The town panchayat is headed by a chairperson, who is elected by the members, who are chosen through direct elections. The town forms part of the Thondamuthur Assembly constituency that elects its member to the Tamil Nadu legislative assembly and the Pollachi Lok Sabha constituency that elects its member to the Parliament of India.

== Demographics ==
As per the 2011 census, Dhaliyur had a population of 11,600 individuals across 3,208 households. The population saw a marginal increase compared to the previous census in 2001 when 9,658 inhabitants were registered. The population consisted of 5,758 males and 5,742 females. About 1,014 individuals were below the age of six years. The entire population is classified as urban. The town has an average literacy rate of 75%. About 12.4% of the population belonged to scheduled castes.

About 50.2% of the eligible population were employed, of which majority were involved in agriculture and allied activities. Hinduism was the majority religion which was followed by 96.4% of the population, with Christianity (2.4%) and Islam (1.3%) being minor religions.
