= Arasur, Coimbatore =

Arasur
- Suburb
- Location in Tamil Nadu, India Arasur (India)
- Coordinates: 11°05′9.96″N 77°6′58.32″E
- Country: India
- State: Tamil Nadu
- Region: Kongu Nadu
- District: Coimbatore

Area
  - Total: 20.14 km^{2} (7.78 sq mi)

Population (2011)
  - Total: 11,510
  - Density: 571.5/km^{2} (1,480/sq mi)

Languages
  - Official: Tamil,
- Time zone: UTC+5:30 (IST)

Arasur is a census town and a suburb in Coimbatore district in the Indian state of Tamil Nadu.

== See also ==
- Coimbatore metropolitan area
