= Ashokapuram =

Ashokapuram may refer to:

- Ashokapuram, Mysore, a neighbourhood in Mysore, Karnataka state, India
  - Ashokapuram railway station, a railway station in Mysore.
- Ashokapuram, Coimbatore, a neighbourhood in Coimbatore, Tamil Nadu, India
