= W. K. Tucker =

British politician, soldier and archaeologist

W. K. Tucker (born about 1875, died 15 May 1934, in Nairobi), otherwise William King-Tucker, known as Colonel W. K. Tucker. He served in various branches of the Indian Army mainly in the Supply and Transport Corps. His official honours and gazetted dates included C.B.E. (Commander of the Order of the British Empire), awarded 3 June 1919 in the King’s Birthday Honours for valuable services rendered in India in connection with the World War I. In the 1920s, following his retirement from the Indian Army, he moved to Nairobi, Kenya, where he became a prominent political figure and a member of the Legislative Council of Kenya (LegCo).

Aside from his administrative and later political contributions, Tucker is known for his archaeological excavations in Sulur (a town and taluk in the Coimbatore district). These focused on Megalithic burial sites (often called 'graves' in older records) in Sulur. The materials were gifted to the British Museum by Tucker's wife, Constance Mary Tucker in 1935 after her husband's demise.

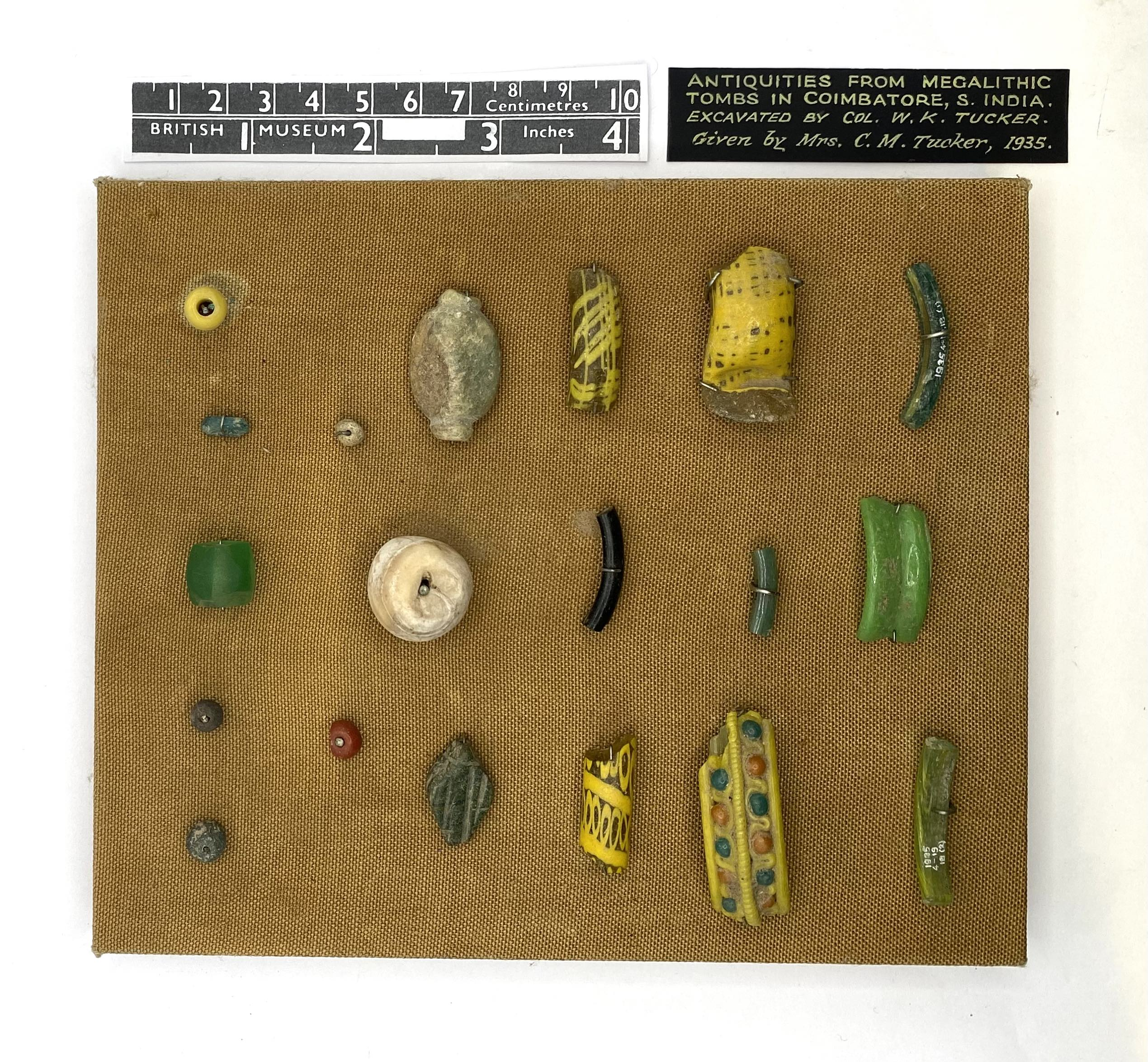
Sulur (Coimbatore, Tamil Nadu). Selection of small finds from Sulur excavated by Col. W. K. Tucker, now in the British Museum

Horace C. Beck analysed the materials excavated by Tucker. His study provided a detailed analysis of the beads, and the Eran-type punch-marked coins found by Tucker in the Sulur graves help point to an early date for the sites. The pottery analysis includes the first formal descriptions of the 'graffiti' or symbols found on the pottery that Tucker unearthed. The pottery has drawn the particular attention of Iravatham Mahadevan. He uses the Sulur pottery and other graffiti as critical evidence for the 'Deep Dravidian' roots of the Indus script.

Tucker's work is sometimes cited in general surveys of South Indian prehistory, such as The Megalithic Culture in South India by B. K. Gururaja Rao and The Iron Age in South India by K. Rajan. Rajan in particular describes Tucker as a pioneer and credits him with some of the earliest recorded observations of the Noyyal River Valley sites that modern archaeology has confirmed to be one of the most densely populated Iron Age regions in the world.
