= Tamil Nadu Telugu Makkal Katchi =

Indian political party

Tamil Nadu Telugu Makkal Katchi (TTMK) is a political party formed in the State of Tamil Nadu, India, to support the Telugu-speaking people there.

C. J. Raj Kumar is the founder and General Secretary of the party. Tamil Nadu Telugu Makkal Katchi was launched in Coimbatore during the time of the 2014 General Assembly elections, though it did not contest the elections at that time. It was launched under the guidance of S. Ramdoss to protect the interests of Telugus living in Kongu Nadu particularly and in Tamil Nadu generally.
