= Coimbatore Golf Club =

Golf club in Tamil Nadu, India

Coimbatore Golf Club Course
- Interactive map of Coimbatore Golf Club Course
- 10.913358°N 77.021861°E

Club information
- Location: Chettipalayam, Coimbatore, India
- Established: 1985
- Type: Public Golf Course
- Owner: Coimbatore Golf Club
- Operator: Coimbatore Golf Club
- Tota holes: 18
- Tournaments: Ram Menon Trophy to be held on 16-December-2007
- Website: www.coimbatoregolfclub.com
- Designed by: G.K.Rajagopal
- Par: 72
- Length: 6,973 yards
- Course rating: USGA Course Rating: Gents 74.2; Ladies 74.5
- Course record: n/a

The Coimbatore Golf Club is an 18-hole golf course located in a place called Chettipalayam in Coimbatore, located within the city limits in the state of Tamil Nadu in India. The club is also a popular venue for major Golf Tournaments held in India.

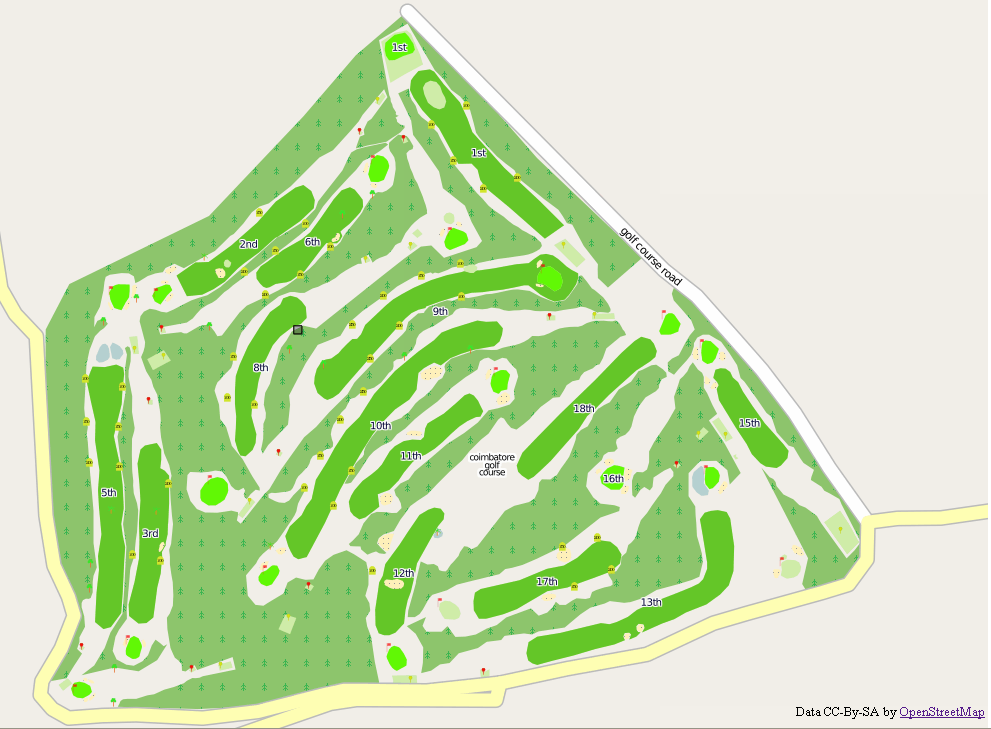
Coimbatore Golf Course

== History ==
The club was formed by few enthusiasts in Coimbatore in 1977, who till then used to drive up to the Golf courses in Ooty, Coonoor and Kodaikanal. Initially, the club laid out a 9-hole course in Jail grounds in the city. Later in 1985 the Club laid out a new course designed by one of the founders G.K. Rajagopal in Chettipalayam village. The course is now 16 km from the city centre. The Founder President of The Coimbatore Golf Club was Mr.K.Venkatesalu.

== Location ==
The Course is located in Chettipalayam, 17 km from the Coimbatore city center in Tamil Nadu state of India. The course is located in at the base of the Nilgiri Mountains.
