= Mopperipalayam =

- Panchayat town
- Location in Tamil Nadu, India
- Coordinates: 11°8′49″N 77°8′38″E
- Country: India
- State: Tamil Nadu
- District: Coimbatore

Area
  - Total: 15 km^{2} (5.8 sq mi)

Population (2011)
  - Total: 10,923
  - Density: 730/km^{2} (1,900/sq mi)

Languages
  - Official: Tamil
- Time zone: UTC+5:30 (IST)

Mopperipalayam is a panchayat town in Sulur taluk of Coimbatore district in the Indian state of Tamil Nadu. Located in the western part of the state, it is one of the 33 panchayat towns in the district. Spread across an area of 15 km^{2} (5.8 sq mi), it had a population of 10,923 individuals as per the 2011 census.

== Geography and administration ==
Mopperipalayam is located in Sulur taluk of Coimbatore district in the Indian state of Tamil Nadu. Spread across an area of 15 km^{2} (5.8 sq mi), it is located in the western part of the state. It is one of the 33 panchayat towns in the district.

The town panchayat is headed by a chairperson, who is elected by the members, who are chosen through direct elections. The town forms part of the Sulur Assembly constituency that elects its member to the Tamil Nadu legislative assembly and the Coimbatore Lok Sabha constituency that elects its member to the Parliament of India.

== Demographics ==
As per the 2011 census, Mopperipalayam had a population of 10,923 individuals across 3,094 households. The population saw a marginal increase compared to the previous census in 2001 when 8,732 inhabitants were registered. The population consisted of 5,485 males and 5,438 females. About 1,000 individuals were below the age of six years. The entire population is classified as urban. The town has an average literacy rate of 75%. About 14.3% of the population belonged to scheduled castes.

About 54.3% of the eligible population were employed, of which majority were involved in agriculture and allied activities. Hinduism was the majority religion which was followed by 97.0% of the population, with Christianity (2.4%) and Islam (0.4%) being minor religions.
