= Selakkarichal =

Selakarichal
- Village
- Country: India
- State: Tamil Nadu
- Region: Kongu Nadu
- District: Coimbatore
- Metropolitan: Coimbatore
- Established

Government
  - Type: Town
  - Body: Kamanaicken palayam Town

Population (2011)
  - Total: 5,626
- Time zone: UTC+5:30 (IST)
- Postal code: 641658
- Telephone code: +91-04255
- Vehicle registration: TN-39

Selakarachal Gram Panchayat is a panchayat, which is located in Kamanaicken Palayam of Coimbatore District in the state of Tamil Nadu, India. The panchayat falls under the Sulur Assembly constituency and the Coimbatore Lok Sabha constituency. The panchayat has a total of 7 panchayat constituencies. Out of these, 7 panchayat members are elected. According to the 2011 Census of India, the total population is 6209. Of these, 3100 are women and 3109 are men. The village has a presence in wind power generation in India.
