= Alandurai =

- Panchayat town
- Location in Tamil Nadu, India
- Coordinates: 10°55′43″N 76°46′34″E
- Country: India
- State: Tamil Nadu
- District: Coimbatore

Area
  - Total: 21.68 km^{2} (8.37 sq mi)

Population (2011)
  - Total: 7,221
  - Density: 333.1/km^{2} (862.7/sq mi)

Languages
  - Official: Tamil
- Time zone: UTC+5:30 (IST)

Alandurai is a panchayat town in Coimbatore South taluk of Coimbatore district in the Indian state of Tamil Nadu. It is located in the north-western part of the state. Spread across an area of 21.68 km^{2} (8.37 sq mi), it had a population of 7,221 individuals as per the 2011 census.

== Geography and administration ==
Alandurai is located in Coimbatore South taluk of Coimbatore district in the Indian state of Tamil Nadu. Spread across an area of 21.68 km^{2} (8.37 sq mi), it is one of the 33 panchayat towns in the district. It is located in the western part of the state. The region has a tropical climate with hot summers and mild winters. The highest temperatures are recorded in April and May, with lowest recordings in December-January.

The town panchayat is headed by a chairperson, who is elected by the members, who are chosen through direct elections. The town forms part of the Thondamuthur Assembly constituency that elects its member to the Tamil Nadu legislative assembly and the Pollachi Lok Sabha constituency that elects its member to the Parliament of India.

== Demographics ==
As per the 2011 census, Alandurai had a population of 7,221 individuals across 2,004 households. The population saw a marginal increase compared to the previous census in 2001 when 7,130 inhabitants were registered. The population consisted of 3,547 males and 3,674 females. About 589 individuals were below the age of six years. The entire population is classified as urban. The town has an average literacy rate of 68.3%. About 15.2% of the population belonged to scheduled castes and 7.2% belonged to scheduled tribes.

About 55% of the eligible population were employed, of which majority were involved in agriculture and allied activities. Hinduism was the majority religion which was followed by 97.2% of the population, with Christianity (1.7%) and Islam (0.7%) being minor religions.
