= Pattanam, Coimbatore =

Eriveera Pattanam alias Pattanam Eriveera Pattanam Eriveera Pattanam
- Suburb
- Location in Tamil Nadu, India Eriveera Pattanam alias Pattanam (India)
- Coordinates: 10°58′47″N 77°03′18″E
- Country: India
- State: Tamil Nadu
- Region: Kongu Nadu
- District: Coimbatore

Government
  - Body: Pattanam town panchayat special grade

Area
  - Total: 10.54 km^{2} (4.07 sq mi)

Population (2020)
  - Total: 30,000
  - Density: 2,800/km^{2} (7,400/sq mi)

Languages
  - Official: Tamil,
- Time zone: UTC+5:30 (IST)
- Postal code: 641016

Eriveerapattanam also known as pattanam is a census town and a suburb in Coimbatore district in the Indian state of Tamil Nadu.

Erivirapattanas' refers to towns or cities that were established during the Chola period which had special significance as protected mercantile towns. These towns were centers of trade and commerce, often with a legal or military framework designed to protect merchants and facilitate the growth of trade. These towns played an important role in the economic and cultural development during the Chola dynasty.

Information Booster:

Chola Period: The Chola dynasty was known for its advancements in trade, administration, and culture, with an extensive network of ports, towns, and cities Erivirapattanas: These towns were specifically protected due to their importance as trade hubs, fostering commerce, and promoting urbanization. Mercantile Activity: These towns were closely associated with trade activities, making them key contributors to the economy, both locally and in the broader Southeast Asian region.

== See also ==
- Coimbatore metropolitan area
