= Kannampalayam =

- Panchayat town
- Location in Tamil Nadu, India
- Coordinates: 11°00′30″N 77°06′08″E
- Country: India
- State: Tamil Nadu
- District: Coimbatore

Area
  - Total: 11.32 km^{2} (4.37 sq mi)

Population (2011)
  - Total: 11,940
  - Density: 1,055/km^{2} (2,732/sq mi)

Languages
  - Official: Tamil
- Time zone: UTC+5:30 (IST)

Kannampalayam is a panchayat town in Sulur taluk of Coimbatore district in the Indian state of Tamil Nadu. It is located in the north-western part of the state. Spread across an area of 11.32 km^{2} (4.37 sq mi), it had a population of 11,940 individuals as per the 2011 census.

== Geography and administration ==
Kannampalayam is located in Sulur taluk of Coimbatore district in the Indian state of Tamil Nadu. Spread across an area of 11.32 km^{2} (4.37 sq mi), it is one of the 33 panchayat towns in the district. It is located in the western part of the state.

The town panchayat is headed by a chairperson, who is elected by the members, who are chosen through direct elections. The town forms part of the Sulur Assembly constituency that elects its member to the Tamil Nadu legislative assembly and the Coimbatore Lok Sabha constituency that elects its member to the Parliament of India.

== Demographics ==
As per the 2011 census, Kannampalayam had a population of 15,868 individuals across 4,577 households. The population saw a marginal increase compared to the previous census in 2001 when 11,940 inhabitants were registered. The population consisted of 7,937 males and 7,931 females. About 1,553 individuals were below the age of six years. The entire population is classified as urban. The town has an average literacy rate of 87.9%. About 13.1% of the population belonged to scheduled castes.

About 45.7% of the eligible population were employed full-time. Hinduism was the majority religion which was followed by 92.2% of the population, with Christianity (6.9%) and Islam (0.4%) being minor religions.
