= Idikarai =

- Panchayat town
- Location in Tamil Nadu, India
- Coordinates: 11°7′33″N 76°57′58″E
- Country: India
- State: Tamil Nadu
- District: Coimbatore

Area
  - Total: 4.7 km^{2} (1.8 sq mi)

Population (2011)
  - Total: 8,686
  - Density: 1,800/km^{2} (4,800/sq mi)

Languages
  - Official: Tamil
- Time zone: UTC+5:30 (IST)

Idikarai is a panchayat town in Coimbatore North taluk of Coimbatore district in the Indian state of Tamil Nadu. It is located in the north-western part of the state. Spread across an area of 4.7 km^{2} (1.8 sq mi), it had a population of 8,686 individuals as per the 2011 census.

== Geography and administration ==
Idikarai is located in Coimbatore North taluk of Coimbatore district in the Indian state of Tamil Nadu. Spread across an area of 4.7 km^{2} (1.8 sq mi), it is one of the 33 panchayat towns in the district. It is located in the western part of the state. Idikarai is situated on the banks of two rain-fed canals, which led to the name "Irukarai" meaning two banks in Tamil, which later became Idikarai.

The town panchayat is headed by a chairperson, who is elected by the members, who are chosen through direct elections. The town forms part of the Kavundampalayam Assembly constituency that elects its member to the Tamil Nadu legislative assembly and the Coimbatore Lok Sabha constituency that elects its member to the Parliament of India.

== Demographics ==
As per the 2011 census, Idikarai had a population of 8,686 individuals across 2,491 households. The population saw a marginal increase compared to the previous census in 2001 when 6,333 inhabitants were registered. The population consisted of 4,372 males and 4,314 females. About 776 individuals were below the age of six years. The entire population is classified as urban. The town has an average literacy rate of 79.7%. About 16.1% of the population belonged to scheduled castes.

About 48.5% of the eligible population were employed full-time, of which majority were involved in agriculture and allied activities. Hinduism was the majority religion which was followed by 96.8% of the population, with Christianity (2.2%) and Islam (0.6%) being minor religions. Sri Villeswarar temple dedicated to Shiva is a notable Hindu pilgrimage site in the region.
