= Pooluvapatti =

- Panchayat town
- Location in Tamil Nadu, India
- Coordinates: 10°56′59″N 76°48′51″E
- Country: India
- State: Tamil Nadu
- District: Coimbatore

Area
  - Total: 16.5 km^{2} (6.4 sq mi)

Population (2011)
  - Total: 12,853
  - Density: 779/km^{2} (2,020/sq mi)

Languages
  - Official: Tamil
- Time zone: UTC+5:30 (IST)

Pooluvapatti is a panchayat town in Coimbatore South taluk of Coimbatore district in the Indian state of Tamil Nadu. Located in the north-western part of the state, it is one of the 33 panchayat towns in the district. Spread across an area of 16.5 km^{2} (6.4 sq mi), it had a population of 12,853 individuals as per the 2011 census.

== Geography and administration ==
Pooluvapatti is located in Coimbatore South taluk of Coimbatore district in the Indian state of Tamil Nadu. Spread across an area of 16.5 km^{2} (6.4 sq mi), it is located in the western part of the state. It is one of the 33 panchayat towns in the district. The town panchayat is headed by a chairperson, who is elected by the members, who are chosen through direct elections. The town forms part of the Thondamuthur Assembly constituency that elects its member to the Tamil Nadu legislative assembly and the Pollachi Lok Sabha constituency that elects its member to the Parliament of India.

== Demographics ==
As per the 2011 census, Pooluvapatti had a population of 12,853 individuals across 3,575 households. The population saw a marginal increase compared to the previous census in 2001 when 11,964 inhabitants were registered. The population consisted of 6,386 males and 6,467 females. About 1,153 individuals were below the age of six years. The entire population is classified as urban. The town has an average literacy rate of 69.4%. About 22.6% of the population belonged to scheduled castes.

About 50.1% of the eligible population were employed, of which majority were involved in agriculture and allied activities. Hinduism was the majority religion which was followed by 96.9% of the population, with Christianity (2.2%) and Islam (0.8%) being minor religions.
