= Kalapatti =

Neighbourhood in Coimbatore, Tamil Nadu, India

- Neighbourhood
- Location in Tamil Nadu, India
- Coordinates: 11°04′18″N 77°02′26″E
- Country: India
- State: Tamil Nadu
- District: Coimbatore

Area
  - Total: 25.6 km^{2} (9.9 sq mi)

Population (2011)
  - Total: 39,586
  - Density: 1,550/km^{2} (4,000/sq mi)

Languages
  - Official: Tamil
- Time zone: UTC+5:30 (IST)
- PIN: 641048
- Telephone code: +91-422
- Vehicle registration: TN38

Kalapatti is a neighborhood of the city of Coimbatore in the Indian state of Tamil Nadu, India. It was a panchayat town until 2011, when it was merged with the Coimbatore Corporation. It is part of the east zone of the corporation. Spread across an area of 25.6 km^{2} (9.9 sq mi), it had a population of 39,586 individuals as per the 2011 census.

== Geography and administration ==
Kalapatti is a neighborhood of the city of Coimbatore in the Indian state of Tamil Nadu. It was a Panchayat town until 2011, when it was merged with the Coimbatore Corporation, along with Singanallur and Vilankurichi. It forms part of the Coimbatore North taluk. It is located in the western part of the state. Spread across an area of 25.6 km^{2} (9.9 sq mi), it is one of the 20 wards in the east zone of the Coimbatore corporation. Kalapatti is located off Avinashi road, a main arterial road in Coimbatore, close to the Coimbatore International Airport and commercial establishments.

The region has a tropical climate with hot summers and mild winters. The highest temperatures are recorded in April and May, with lowest recordings in December-January. he neighborhood forms part of the Kavundampalayam Assembly constituency that elects its member to the Tamil Nadu legislative assembly and the Coimbatore Lok Sabha constituency that elects its member to the Parliament of India.

== Demographics ==
As per the 2011 census, Kalapatti had a population of 39,586 individuals across 10,969 households. The population saw a significant increase compared to the previous census in 2001 when 22,034 inhabitants were registered. The population consisted of 19,936 males and 19,650 females. About 3,993 individuals were below the age of six years. The entire population is classified as urban. The town has an average literacy rate of 89.8%. About 8.6% of the population belonged to scheduled castes.

About 45.1% of the eligible population were employed full-time. Hinduism was the majority religion which was followed by 92.8% of the population, with Christianity (5.5%) and Islam (1.2%) being minor religions.
