= Sulur =

Suburb in Coimbatore, Tamil Nadu, India

- Town
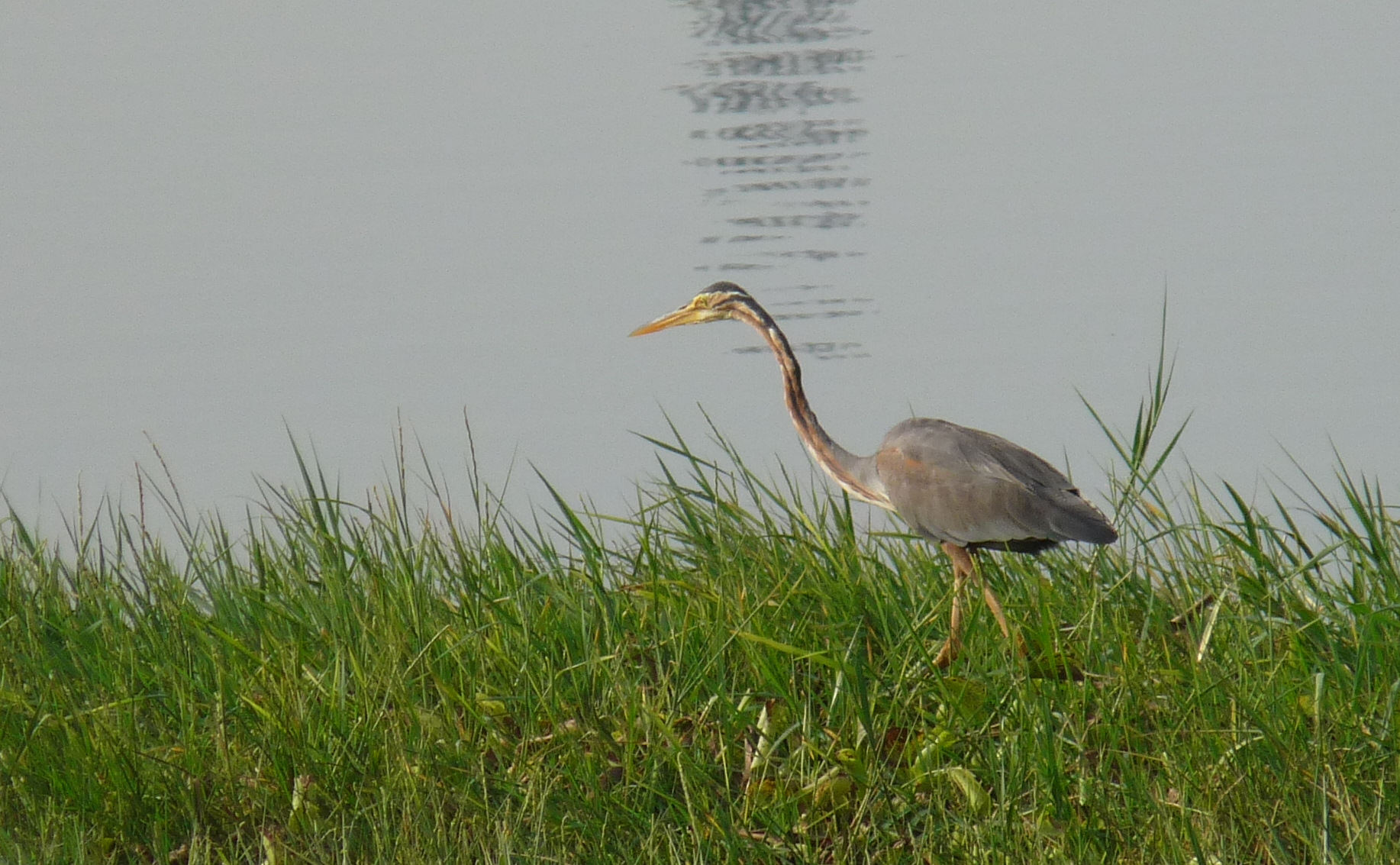
- Sulur Lake

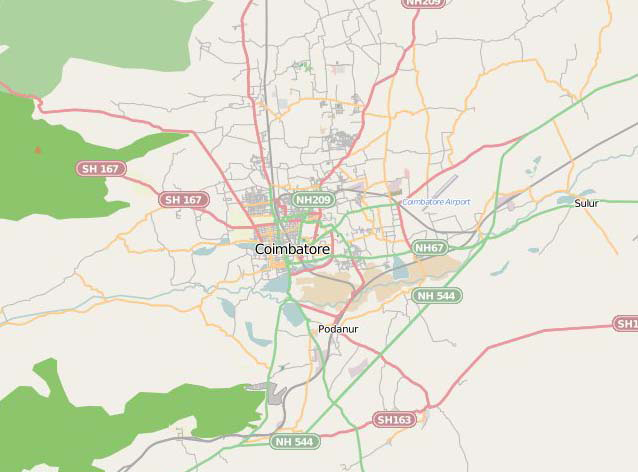
- Location in Coimbatore, Tamil Nadu Sulur (Tamil Nadu) Sulur (India)
- Coordinates: 11°01′31″N 77°07′29″E
- Country: India
- State: Tamil Nadu
- Region: Kongu Nadu
- District: Coimbatore
- Taluk: Sulur
- Metropolitan area: Coimbatore

Area
  - Total: 10.96 km^{2} (4.23 sq mi)
- Elevation: 340 m (1,120 ft)

Population (2011)
  - Total: 27,909
  - Density: 2,546/km^{2} (6,595/sq mi)

Languages
  - Official: Tamil, English
- Time zone: UTC+5:30 (IST)
- PIN: 641402
- Telephone code: +91-422
- Vehicle registration: TN-37Z

Sulur is a town located in the Coimbatore district of Tamil Nadu, India. It is a suburb of Coimbatore. It is the headquarters of Sulur Taluk of Coimbatore district. There are many market places and many big retail and wholesale shops are available and also taluk office, police station, and a famous RVS institutions consisting of medical college, arts college is there in Sulur. And also two big famous temples are there. It is also a taluk (Sulur taluk) and legislative constituency (Sulur (state assembly constituency)) which comes under the Coimbatore parliamentary constituency.

== Demographics ==
As of 2001 India census, Sulur had a population of 24,359 - Though this census is considered inaccurate. Males constitute 51% of the population and females 49%. Sulur has an average literacy rate of 78%, higher than the national average of 59.5%. Male literacy is 83%, and female literacy is 72%. 9% of the population in Sulur are children below the age of 6 years.

== History ==
Sulur is a medieval period trade centre situated in the left bank of the river Noyyal. Megalithic burials were noticed in this place during Archaeology excavation. The coins of 3rd century BCE were unearthed in the burial. Two medieval period Vatteluthu inscriptions were also found. Apart from this, semi precious stone beads were also collected here.

== Etymology ==
Sulur was called Suralur until the ninth century and from the ninth century to fourteenth century it was called Ariyapirati Nallur, during the regime of Aditya Cholan. Until the eighteenth century, it was called Sundrapandiya Nallur, during the regime of Sundra Pandiyan. From eighteenth century it was called Suranur, which in due course got transformed to Sulur. There are several theories for this name; it may be for a type of Sugarcane, Sural, Suranoor.

== Geography ==
Sulur is located at 11.0254°N 77.1246°E. It has an average elevation of 340 metres (1115 feet). Sulur is regarded as a pleasant town situated very close to the cities of Coimbatore "Manchester of South India" (19 km) and Tirupur (35 km). Thus it is a popular location for various textile mills and weaving slots. Near to Sulur there is a railway station and an Air Force base. The twin lakes to the north of the town, bounding the Coimbatore-Nagapattinam highway adds a scenic view to the town. The town is divided into two parts by the holy Noyyal River. Sulur is the East-end of the new Coimbatore district.

== History ==
The history of Sulur dates back to around 2300 years ago. Ancient coin of Eran dating back to third century BC have been found at Sulur. During the ninth century AD, Aditya Cholan introduced agriculture in Sulur. The Sulur Reservoir was constructed during the reign of Adithya Chola. The Sulur pond was reconstructed in thirteenth century during the rule of Sundra Pandian. The Megalithic pottery [sulur dish] dating back to first century has been found in archeological digs at Sulur and is currently in display at the British Museum, London (No:1935.4-19.15). The inscriptions on the pottery might even be from the harappa civilization. During the Vijanagara Period, most of the Kannada people and Telugu people settled in Sulur.

Coimbatore District Map

== Education ==
Sulur is very rich with respect to Education. There are several Educational Institutions in and around Sulur which nourishes the knowledge base of Coimbatore District as a whole. Few of them are:

- Young India Public School
- RVS Dental College and Hospital, Kumaran Kottam Campus, Kannampalayam, Sulur, Coimbatore
- MDN Future School
- C.S.I Elementary School (Formerly London Mission School) - 1913
- Govt Boys Higher Secondary School
- Govt Girls Higher Secondary School
- Kennedy Matriculation Higher Secondary School
- Kalaivani Matriculation School
- Kendriya Vidyalaya, Air Force Station, Sulur
- RVS Matriculation Higher Secondary School
- Michael Job Matriculation School
- Kovai Maruthamali Matriculation School
- Kids Club (Kindergarten/Primary) school
- Fun Kids Play Centre for Kids
- Central School Sulur
- Anugraha Mandhir CBSE School

The Govt Boys Higher Secondary School was established in 1889 as Thiruvengadanathar Upper Primary School. Over many years, the school has grown to the status of a higher secondary school. Its chronological progress is listed below:

- April 1925 - Taluk Board Higher Elementary School,
- June 1926 - Zilla Board Middle School
- June 1938 - Union, Kalagam Board Secondary School
- July 1962 - Union, Kalagam Board Boys Secondary School
- January 1966 - Govt Boys Secondary School
- July 1978 - Govt Boys Higher Secondary School.

The Girls high school started in July 1962 with 224 students. Its inauguration was attended by the then Chief Minister of Tamil Nadu, Mr. Bhaktavasalam.

All the colleges in Sulur are run by the RVS group (Rathnavel Subramaniam group).

== Agriculture and industries ==
Sulur has many cotton mills that provide employment to approximately 5,000 to 10,000 people from the surrounding area. Many of the people who cannot continue their studies after school join these mills and the knitwear companies of Tirupur. The local market (Sulur Sandhai Tamil: சூலூர் சந்தை) opens near the banks of Sulur river every Friday. People from Sulur and the nearby villages gather here and sell their produce.

In addition to (Sulur Sandhai Tamil: சூலூர் சந்தை) there is another market which is open daily in the morning and evening called as (Uzhavar Sandhai Tamil: உழவர் சந்தை), near to Balaji Hospital on Trichy Road. Market opens early in the morning and caters for retail and wholesale buyers.

== Transport ==
Sulur is well connected by road and rail. Sulur Road railway station (code SUU) is in Muthugoundan Pudur, 3 km apart from Sulur. The nearest International airport is in Peelamedu Coimbatore International Airport, which is about 16 km from Sulur. Buses connect Sulur to most of the nearby villages.The Trichy Road (NH81) runs through Sulur.

== Culture ==
The people of Sulur are known for their hospitality. The 'Thai Pongal Vizha' (Pongal Festival) conducted in Sulur is very popular. This Pongal Vizha is conducted at "Anna Kalaiarangam" a common area in Sulur where many celebrations and get-togethers are held. It is an annual event which encourages people from all ages to participate in a variety of games and events. It also serves as a platform for young children to show their hidden talents.

== Administration ==
Sulur is administered by the elected Panchayat Body headed by the President. Sulur also is the headquarters of the newly created Sulur Taluk. Earlier, Sulur and adjacent areas were part of Palladam taluk of the undivided Coimbatore district. The carving of eastern parts of Coimbatore district into Tirupur district has caused to form the new Taluk headquartered at Sulur.

- The Sulur Panchayat board started functioning on 30 August 1892.
- The Sulur police station came into existence in 1861 during the British rule. Until 1920, the police station was near the girls' high school. After that it got shifted to Trichy road.
- The Registrar Office opened on 1 January 1884.
- The Electricity board opened in Sulur on 1 November 1933, and the Telephone Exchange opened on 31 July 1961.
- The Sulur Post Office was opened in June 1882.
- The Sulur Telegram Office opened on1 February 1948 in the today's post office.
- The Sulur UNIT-RTO Office (TN-37Z) opened on JUNE 2013(vehicles registered under TN-37-CZ, CY, CX series belongs to this RTO).
- The Cooperative Movement in Sulur started in 1911.
- On 22 February 2009 Sulur Taluk was formed and started functioning while bifurcating Coimbatore district.

== Air Force Station Sulur ==
Sulur Air Force Station operated by the Indian Air Force is located at Kangayampalayam village near Sulur. This Air base was established in the year 1940 by RN of the then British Raj. This was a strategic base during World War II for the Royal Navy's Fleet Air Arm: "Royal Navy Air Squadron"(RNAS). This base was used as repair base for Southeast Asian planes. The Sulur Airfield which was used by the British, was burned down on 26 August 1942 during the 1942 August Quit India Movement to overthrow the British empire from Indian soil. In 1943, the Royal Indian Airforce (RIAF) came to Sulur, which later got shifted to Cochin in 1949. After gaining independence, the Indian Navy established INAS Hansa at this place to operate the Sea Hawks. Following the liberation of Goa, INAS Hansa shifted to Dabolim there and Sulur was taken over by the Air Force. In 1955, the 5BRD (No 5, Base Repair Depot) of Indian Air Force was planned and it started functioning in 1959. For some time this airfield was also used for civil aviation. Since 14 January 1984 the airfield has been a part of the Indian Air Force. The runway was used for racing motorcycle and cars in the 1960s. Sulur airbase is also being developed for hosting Tejas LCA by 2014–15.

== Religion ==
Sulur has numerous temples, of which, Perumal Kovil, Vaitheeswaran Kovil, and Mahakaliamman Kovil are very popular. Perumal Kovil and Eswaran Kovil are situated on the banks of Sulur Lake. It also has the famous Kumaran Kottam temple, Sulur Tirupathi and Bagavathi constructed by RVS group of institutions.

The Perumalkovil (Perumal temple) was constructed during the 15th century during the Vijayanagar regime. In Perumal Kovil, 'pepper' is given to devotees which is not done in any other Venkateshwara temple. The myth behind this is that a merchant was travelling through the forests of Sulur to go to nearby town to sell his food items. Night descended and so he decided to take rest in the temple. When he was about to sleep, a god appeared before him in the form of a poor farmer and asked him if he had anything to eat. The merchant told that he had nothing except pepper in all his bags which could not be eaten. So the god said "ok" and left the place. The next day when he woke up, to his surprise he found all his bags contained pepper. Then he realized the person who came the previous day was not an ordinary man but the god Balaji. He immediately went before the statue and cried for forgiveness. Balaji appeared before him and told that he would be forgiven if he renovated the temple and the temple gave out pepper to all of his worshippers from that day forth.

The Sulur Sivankovil (Sivan Temple) was constructed in the 9th century during the rule of Adithya Cholan.

The Masjid at Sulur was constructed in the 18th century. The land and the funds for the Masjid were donated by Tipu Sultan.

Apart from temples and mosques there are also Catholic and London mission (Latterly C.S.I) Lutheran churches in the town of Sulur. There are many Pentecostal Churches too which were established from 1970. The First Pentecostal Church established was Home Church of India and one among the Pentecostal Church is Central Church of Garment India which is having branches in three states of India.

== Villages in Sulur Taluk ==
- Selakarachal
- Pappampatti
- Bogampatti
- Chinnakuyili
- Sencherimalai
- Kannampalayam
- Periyakuyili
- Ponnakkani
- Ravatur
- Vadambacheri
- Sultanpet
- Selliya Goundan Pudur
- Kadampadi
- Kangeyempalayam
- Arasur
- Muthugoundenpudhur
- Kaniyur
- K.madhapur
- Rasipalayam
- Neelambur
- Mylampatti
- Chinniyampalayam
- Kalangal

== See also ==
- Sulur Block, a revenue block
- Sulur taluk
- Sulur Assembly constituency
- Sulur Air Force Station
- Sulur Road railway station
- Timeline of Coimbatore
- Coimbatore district
