= Vadavedampatti =

- Panchayat
- Country: India
- State: Tamil Nadu
- District: Coimbatore
- Taluk: Sulur

Government
  - Type: Gram panchayat
  - Panchayat President: Santhamani Viswanathan

Population (2011)
  - Total: 2,443

Languages
  - Official: Tamil
- Time zone: UTC+05:30 (IST)
- Postal code / PIN code: 641671
- STD Code: 04255

Vadavedampatti is a village that is located in Tamil Nadu, southern part of India. This village is located at Kamanaicken Palayam in Coimbatore. Majority of people speaks Tamil. In olden days this place was called as Uttiraserimaampuri. Mariamman temple is famous. The primary profession of this village is farming. More temples are available than the schools. President of the Village Thirumathi Santhamani Viswanathan

== History ==
In ancient days this village was called as Uththira Serimaampuri.

The meaning of the ancient village name based on dictionary word is the following,

== Basic Amenities ==
Following facilities as per the year 2015

Facility type	Count
Water connections	178
Mini power pumps	3
Hand pumps	7
Overhead tanks	5
Ground level reservoir	3
Buildings	21
Schools	5
Ponds	6
Playgrounds	1
Market	
Panchayat union roads	53
Panchayat roads	4
Bus stands	
Graveyards	3

== Small villages ==
Vadavedampatti village panchayat consists of the following small villages

1. Karumpuravipalayam
2. Vadavedampatti

== Basic details ==
Postal code of Vadavedampatti is 641671

== Temples and festivals ==
Vadavedampatti's major temple festival is Mariamman Temple Festival, that is celebrated each year last week or prior to last week of Tamil month Puraṭṭāsi.

Vadavedampatti Mariamman temple festival is celebrated as a 3 days festival.

Day 1 - Maa vilakku (Translated to Tamil as மா விளக்கு ), Alagu kuthuthal (அலகு குத்துதல்), and Ther iluthhal (தேர் இழுத்தல் ).

Day 2 - Alagu kuthuthal (அலகு குத்துதல்), Poo oodu eduthal (பூ ஓடு எடுத்தல்).

Day 3 - Manjal neerattu (மஞ்சள் நீராட்டு).

Part of this is the Ther procession that carries 'Ther Thiruvizha' pulled by people that consider it an honor.
