= Kaniyur, Coimbatore =

Kaniyur
- Suburb
- Location in Tamil Nadu, India Kaniyur (India)
- Coordinates: 11°05′35.5″N 77°8′48.5″E
- Country: India
- State: Tamil Nadu
- Region: Kongu Nadu
- District: Coimbatore

Area
  - Total: 18.33 km^{2} (7.08 sq mi)

Population (2011)
  - Total: 12,011
  - Density: 655.3/km^{2} (1,697/sq mi)

Languages
  - Official: Tamil,
- Time zone: UTC+5:30 (IST)
- Postal code: 641048

Kaniyur is a census town and a suburb in Coimbatore district in the Indian state of Tamil Nadu.

== See also ==
- Coimbatore metropolitan area
