= Karumathampatti =

- Town
- Location in Tamil Nadu, India
- Coordinates: 11.242800°N 76.958700°E
- Country: India
- State: Tamil Nadu
- District: Coimbatore

Area
  - Total: 27 km^{2} (10 sq mi)

Population (2011)
  - Total: 35,062
  - Density: 1,300/km^{2} (3,400/sq mi)

Languages
  - Official: Tamil
- Time zone: UTC+05:30 (IST)
- Vehicle registration: TN-37

Karumathampatti is a town in Coimbatore district in the Indian state of Tamil Nadu. It was a panchayat town till 2021, when it was elevated to a municipality. Spread across an area of 127 km^{2} (49 sq mi), it had a population of 35,062 individuals as per the 2011 census.

== Geography and administration ==
Karumathampatti is a municipality located in Sulur taluk of Coimbatore district in the Indian state of Tamil Nadu. Spread across an area of 27 km^{2} (10 sq mi), it is located in the western part of the state. It was a panchayat town till 2021, when it was upgraded to a municipality. The region has a tropical climate with hot summers and mild winters. The highest temperatures are recorded in April and May, with lowest recordings in December–January.

The municipality is headed by a chairperson, who is elected by the members, who are chosen through direct elections. The town forms part of the Sulur Assembly constituency that elects its member to the Tamil Nadu legislative assembly and the Coimbatore Lok Sabha constituency that elects its member to the Parliament of India. is located off Avinashi Road, a main arterial road connecting Coimbatore, and is one of the termini of the planned first line of the Coimbatore metro.

== Demographics ==
As per the 2011 census, Karumathampatti had a population of 35,062 individuals across 10,071 households. The population saw a marginal increase compared to the previous census in 2001 when 26,477 inhabitants were registered. The population consisted of 17,593 males and 17,469 females. About 3,473 individuals were below the age of six years. The entire population is classified as urban. The town has an average literacy rate of 82.9%. About 9.8% of the population belonged to scheduled castes. About 46.4% of the eligible population were employed full-time.

Hinduism was the majority religion which was followed by 84.2% of the population, with Christianity (14.2%) and Islam (1.4%) being minor religions.
