= Muthugoundenpudur =

Muthugoundanpudur
- Suburb
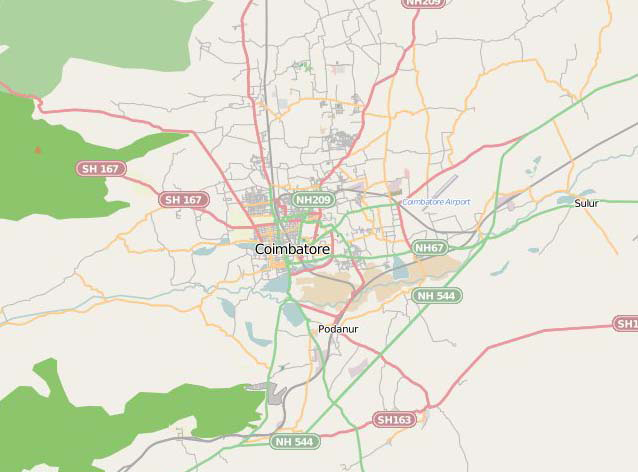
- Location in Coimbatore Location in Tamil Nadu Location in India
- Coordinates: 11.04880°N 77.11465°E,
- Country: India
- State: Tamil Nadu
- Region: Kongu Nadu
- District: Coimbatore

Area
  - Total: 17 km^{2} (6.6 sq mi)

Population (2011)
  - Total: 10,259
  - Density: 600/km^{2} (1,600/sq mi)

Languages
  - Official: Tamil,
- Time zone: UTC+5:30 (IST)

Muthugoundanpudur is a census town and a suburb in Coimbatore district in the Indian state of Tamil Nadu. Sulur Road railway station is located in this town.

== See also ==
- Coimbatore metropolitan area
