= Sukrawarpettai =

Coimbatore, Tamilnadu, India

- Town
- Sukrawarpet, Coimbatore district, Tamil Nadu
- Coordinates: 10.9986°N 76.9560°E

Sukrawarpettai or Sukrawarpet is a neighbourhood of Coimbatore in Tamil Nadu, India. It falls within the Coimbatore South constituency of the Tamil Nadu Legislative Assembly.

Sukrawarpet is a locality within Townhall neighborhood of Coimbatore, India. It is a busy commercial arena of the city and a range of wholesale markets are located here. Sukrawarpet is one of the oldest neighborhoods of the city with narrow streets and vintage buildings. There is a sizable north Indian community living here. Marwaris from northern India (mainly from Gujarat and Rajasthan), mostly money lenders and businessmen, have settled in and around the area during the 1970s. One can see women walking about in colorful north Indian traditional clothing and jewellery. Many of the store signs and name boards are in Hindi or Gujarati scripts.

Most Streets in Sukrawarpet are rather narrow, with a few exceptions like RG Street, Sukrawarpet street, Uppukaner lane, Big bazaar street. The buildings in the streets are so close to each other that they look like they share a common wall. With thousands of people thronging the streets of Sukrawarpet. The sight is typical of the crowded bazaars of Indian cities - a potpourri of different vendors and artisans, trading and making a variety of articles. The area around Rangai Gownder street is famous for shopping and one can find varieties of north Indian chat and other delicacies.

A couple of Jain temples a present in and around Sukrawarpet. Sukrawarpet is close to Flower market, Town hall and Gandhi Park. All the buses going towards Gandhi Park and Ukkadam could be used to reach this area.
