= Vedapatti =

- Panchayat town
- Location in Tamil Nadu, India
- Coordinates: 11°00′00″N 76°53′38″E
- Country: India
- State: Tamil Nadu
- District: Coimbatore

Area
  - Total: 6.2 km^{2} (2.4 sq mi)

Population (2011)
  - Total: 11,658
  - Density: 1,900/km^{2} (4,900/sq mi)

Languages
  - Official: Tamil
- Time zone: UTC+5:30 (IST)

Vedapatti is a panchayat town in Perur taluk of Coimbatore district in the Indian state of Tamil Nadu. Located in the western part of the state, it is one of the 33 panchayat towns in the district. Spread across an area of 6.2 km^{2} (2.4 sq mi), it had a population of 11,658 individuals as per the 2011 census.

== Geography and administration ==
Vedapatti is located in Perur taluk of Coimbatore district in the Indian state of Tamil Nadu. It is one of the 33 panchayat towns in the district. Spread across an area of 6.2 km^{2} (2.4 sq mi), it is located in the western part of the state.

The town panchayat is headed by a chairperson, who is elected by the members representing each of the 15 wards. The members themselves are chosen through direct elections. The town forms part of the Thondamuthur Assembly constituency that elects its member to the Tamil Nadu legislative assembly and the Pollachi Lok Sabha constituency that elects its member to the Parliament of India.

== Demographics ==
As per the 2011 census, Vedapatti had a population of 11,658 individuals across 3,209 households. The population saw a marginal increase compared to the previous census in 2001 when 9,732 inhabitants were registered. The population consisted of 5,758 males and 5,900 females. About 1,133 individuals were below the age of six years. About 37.7% of the population belonged to scheduled castes. The entire population is classified as urban. The town has an average literacy rate of 81.3%.

About 42.3% of the eligible population were employed, of which majority were involved in agriculture and allied activities. Hinduism was the majority religion which was followed by 95.1% of the population, with Christianity (3.5%) and Islam (0.8%) being minor religions.
