= Kangayampalayam =

Suburb in Coimbatore, Tamil Nadu, India

- suburb
- Location in Tamil Nadu, India
- Coordinates: 11°01′40″N 77°09′04″E
- Country: India
- State: Tamil Nadu
- District: Coimbatore rural
- Metro: Coimbatore

Population (2001)
  - Total: 3,845

Languages
  - Official: Tamil
- Time zone: UTC+5:30 (IST)
- Postal code: 641662
- Telephone code: +91-422
- Vehicle registration: TN 39, TN66

Kangayampalayam is a town in Coimbatore district in the state of Tamil Nadu, India. Many large textile mills and industries are located in and around Kangayampalayam. It is located along National Highway NH 67, Trichy trunk road. Kangayampalayam is surrounded by Sulur, Palladam. The place is good for hospitality.

== Demographics ==
As of 2001 India census, Kangayampalayam had a population of 3845. Males constitute 51% of the population and females 49%. Kangayampalayam has an average literacy rate of 72%, higher than the national average of 59.5%: male literacy is 80%, and female literacy is 64%. In Kangayampalayam, 7% of the population is under 6 years of age.
