= Chinnakuyili =

- suburb
- Location in Tamil Nadu, India Chinnakuyili (India)
- Coordinates: 10°55′39″N 77°5′7″E
- Country: India
- State: Tamil Nadu
- District: Coimbatore

Government
  - Body: Panchayat

Languages
  - Official: Tamil
- Time zone: UTC+5:30 (IST)
- PIN: 641201
- Telephone code: 91 422 2634xxx
- Vehicle registration: TN-37
- Nearest city: Coimbatore
- Lok Sabha constituency: Coimbatore
- Vidhan Sabha constituency: Sulur
- Civic agency: Panchayat

Chinnakuyili is a small village situated in Coimbatore district in the state of Tamil Nadu, India. It has a population of 604 men and 574 women. Chinnakuyili is a minor Panchayat included in Kallappalayam major Panchayat, with large source of income collected from the land taxes. People in this village are engaged in agriculture business and cultivation of maize, vegetables, cotton and coconuts. Most of the people are farmers mostly having cows and engaging in doing milk business. Milk farming is a hobby for all agriculture people for centuries in this village. Chinnakuyili is also known for its pleasant climate, nice people, peaceful atmosphere and nice wind flow.

== Demographics ==
Most of the population are in lower, middle class people earning their living on daily / monthly wages by working in nearby agricultural fields, textile / spinning mills, engineering workshops and small industries.

Every year in the months of May and June, the whole village celebrates Lord Mariamman festival for a week.

== Places to visit ==
At the entrance of Chinnakuyili village, you'll find an ancient Lord Ganesha temple, which has a history dating back over two centuries. Conveniently, the Chinnakuyili main bus stand is situated nearby, making it accessible for visitors. On the western side of the village, along Periyakuyili road, stands the Mariamman Temple. This older temple boasts a three-storied tower constructed in the traditional South Indian temple architecture style. The local community of Chinnakuyili takes care of its maintenance and upkeep.

== Resources ==
Water resources are limited and is highly dependent on an annual monsoon. The village has a spinning mill and many broiler farms. Many farmers have broiler farms as well as their usual agriculture activities. Wind velocity will be high throughout the year. Hence many private companies have installed their windmills here. Approximately 40–50 windmills are installed so far.

== Entertainment ==
In Chinnakuyili village, the youth spend their free time playing traditional Indian games and participating in community service. With a strong Hindu tradition, many of the young people attend religious gatherings every Sunday morning at 7:00 AM IST in the Mariamman Temple premises, where they engage in activities such as yoga, surya namaskar, physical exercises, and fun games. The Rashtriya Swayam Sevak Sangh volunteers are also involved in these gatherings and receive enthusiastic support from the community.

== Transport ==
Coimbatore is nearby city and it is well connected by air, train and buses from all major part of Tamil Nadu and in India. Chinnakuyili can be easily reachable from Coimbatore city by local town buses from Coimbatore town bus stand (Gandhipuram). Town bus route No. 108, 108A and 69B operates from Coimbatore (Gandhipuram) by Tamil Nadu State transport corporation. Buses are available frequently.
