= Meena Estate =

Coimbatore, Tamil Nadu, India

- Neighbourhood
- Location in Tamil Nadu, India
- Coordinates: 11°00′33.3″N 76°59′48.5″E
- Country: India
- State: Tamil Nadu
- District: Coimbatore
- Elevation: 411 m (1,348 ft)

Languages
  - Official: Tamil
- Time zone: UTC+5:30 (IST)
- PIN: 641028
- Telephone code: 91-422
- Vehicle registration: TN-66

Meena Estate is a residential area which was promoted by the Coimbatore Corporation in the State of Tamil Nadu, India. Meena Estate has become a costlier area that came into a position of 8th in the city. Since the only Kendriya Vidyalaya of the city is located at Meena Estate, the majority of the residents are government employees.

== Geography ==
Meena Estate is situated between Avinashi Road and Trichy Road near to Puliakulam. Meena Estate shares border with: Puliakulam, Amman Kulam, Sowripalayam, Udayampalayam and Peelamedu.

== Population ==
Meena Estate has an approximate population of 50,000. Majority of the population is Central and State Govt employees, who preferred to send their wards to the Central School (KV) located here. Floating population includes Defence Service Personnel, Paramilitary Personnel and other Central Govt employees who have to move frequently on transfers.

== Climate ==
Meena Estate possess similar climatic condition of Coimbatore City, as it is only a part of the city highest temperature ever recorded is 41 °C and lowest is 12 °C.

== Infrastructure ==
=== Design ===
Meena Estate is a well planned neighbour hood. It has three main roads and 7 cross roads. First main road begins from Puliakulam and ends at Hindustan College rear gate. Second Main road begins from Kendriya Vidyalaya. Third Main Road from Udayampalayam on Nava India Road and ends behind Kendriya Vidyalaya.

== Localities ==
Localities of Meena Estate include:

- Elgi Nagar
- Navy Nagar
- Karthic Nagar
- KV Nagar
- Senthil Nagar
