= Bogampatti =

Coordinates: 10°54′09″N 77°07′22″E

- Village
- Interactive map of Bogampatti
- Country: India
- State: Tamil Nadu
- Region: Kongu Nadu
- District: Coimbatore
- Established

Government
  - Type: Village

Population (2011)
  - Total: 1,772
- Time zone: UTC+5:30 (IST)
- Postal code: 641658
- Telephone code: +91-04222
- Vehicle registration: TN-37Z

Bogampatti is a village and gram panchayat located in Sulur Taluk of Coimbatore district in the Indian state of Tamil Nadu. The panchayat falls under the Sulur state assembly constituency and the Coimbatore Lok Sabha constituency. The panchayat has a total of 7 panchayat constituencies. Out of these, 7 panchayat members are elected. According to the 2011 Census of India, the total population is 1,772. Of these, 880 are women and 892 are men. The village has a presence in wind power generation in India. The Tamil Nadu branch office of the leading wind turbine company is located here.
