= Udayampalayam =

Coimbatore, Tamilnadu, India

- Neighbourhood
- Udayampalayam, Coimbatore district, Tamil Nadu
- Coordinates: 11°03′26″N 76°58′18″E
- Country: India
- State: Tamil Nadu
- District: Coimbatore

Languages
  - Official: Tamil, English
  - Speech: Tamil, English
- Time zone: UTC+5:30 (IST)
- Other Neighbourhoods: Singanallur, Ramanathapuram, Maniyakaranpalayam, Ganapathy

Udayampalayam is part of Coimbatore North in the Indian state of Tamil Nadu. It is located 7 km from Coimbatore Railway Station and 18 km from the airport. This is the northern border of the Coimbatore corporation.

Tamil is the major language spoken in the area. The administration is through the ward councillor of the Coimbatore corporation.

V. Ramamoorthy is the current councillor of the Coimbatore Corporation.

Udayampalayam is well connected to other places of the city by bus.

There are many communities (castes) in this village. However the majority is Kongu Vellar Gounder, It was originally a farming village which has now transformed into a residential and industrial area.

Saravana complex and its nearby shops makes the market place for the local shopping. The area also has a petrol station, ATM and bakeries.

== Landmarks ==
Maariamman Temple - Center of Udayampalayam Bajanai Kovil (Sri Srinivasa Perumal Kovil) - Ancestors have created a group of Krishna Leela to pray Lord Krishna... Every year Vaikunda Ekadasi Was Celebrated - BRINDHAVANAM.

Saree and Thavani were the preferred casual wear for ladies. But due to modernization its all moved to western wears. Waisti (Dhoti) are preferred for gents and shirts and pants for young generation.

== Food ==
Rice is the main food. Tender coconut and skimmed butter milk are consumed in large amounts during summer.
