= KCT Tech Park =

Coordinates: 11.081171°N 76.9888473°E

KCT Tech Park is an IT-park situated in Coimbatore, India. It is a unit of Ramanandha Adigalar Foundation and is operational since 2008, with 4.18 acres of land and 2.5 lakh sq ft of built-up area. Software technology parks of India IT Park are housed at KCT Campus building with 1.5 lakh sq ft of built-up area. KCT Tech Park is located at Kumaraguru College of Technology (KCT) with a campus area over 150 acres of land.

== The project ==
The project is located in Saravanampatti, quite practically the IT Corridor of the city with the region housing a large share of IT businesses at Coimbatore, 12 km from Coimbatore International Airport.

== Occupants ==
Several organizations are already operating from KCT Tech Park, which includes:

- Ford Business Services
- State Street HCL Services
- Altran
- Cognizant Technology Solutions
- ThoughtWorks
- Forge Accelerator
- Vanenburge Software India Pvt Ltd
- Sakthi financial services
- Ultramain Systems Pvt Ltd
- Cresc Datasoft Pvt Ltd
- iGlitz Technologies
