= Salur (disambiguation) =

Salur is a town in Vizianagaram district, Andhra Pradesh, India

Salur may also refer to:

- Salur tribe, ancient Oghuz Turkic people

== Places ==
- Salur, Gerede, village in Bolu province, Turkey
- Salur, Elmalı, village in Antalya province, Turkey
- Salur mandal, a mandal in Vizianagaram district, Andhra Pradesh, India
- Salur (ST) (Assembly constituency) in Andhra Pradesh, India
- Salur, Çorum
- Salur, Orta
- Salur, Refahiye

== People with the name ==
- Selma Salur, American mathematician
- Saman Salur (born 1976), Iranian film director
