= Vellanaipatti =

Village in Tamil Nadu, India

Coordinates: 11°05′45″N 77°04′15″E

Vellanaipatti is a village in Coimbatore district of Tamil Nadu state in India. As of the 2011 Census of India, it had a population of 4,636 across 1,324 households.
