= Kuniyamuthur =

Suburb of Coimbatore in Tamil Nadu, India

- Municipality
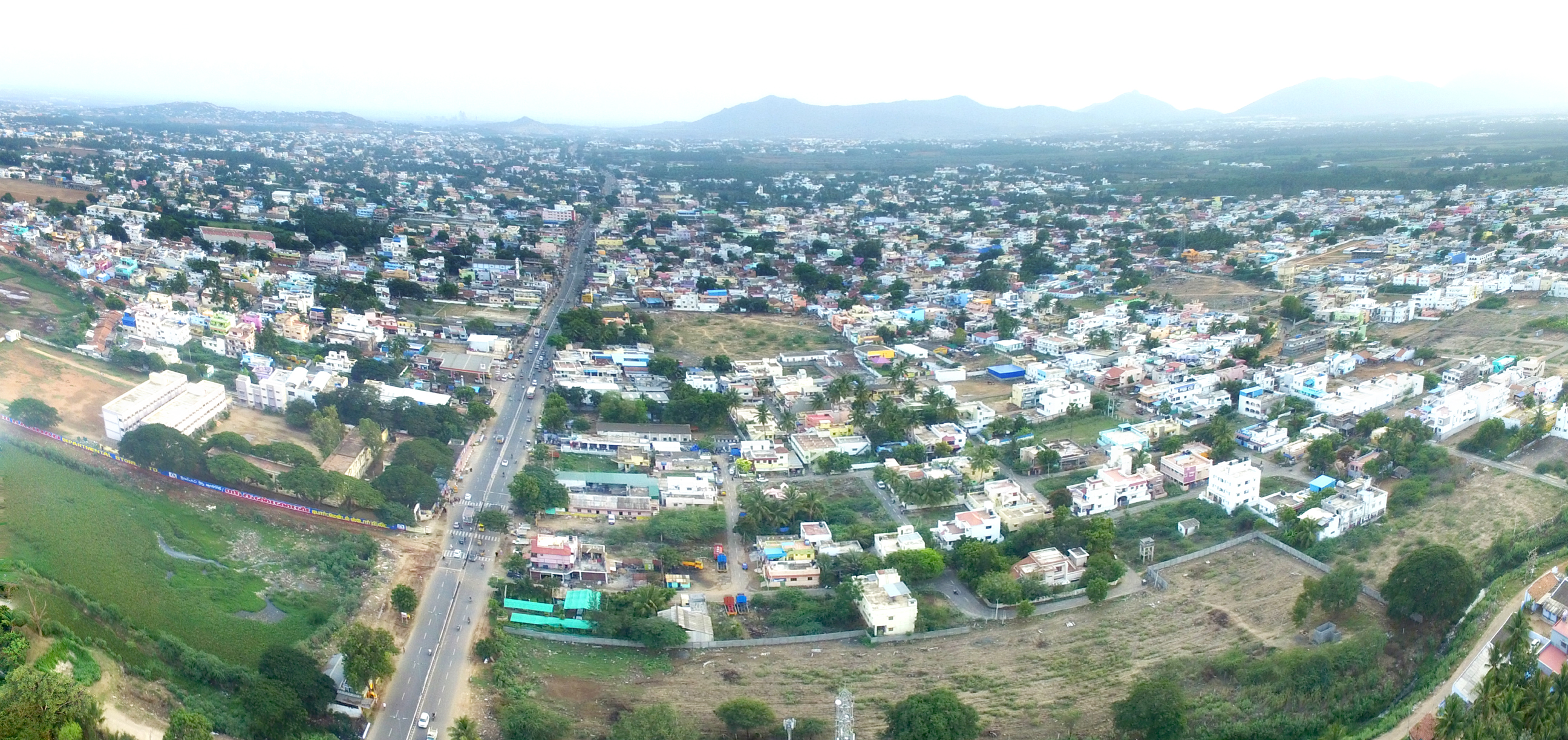
- Skyline of Kuniyamuthur

- Location in Tamil Nadu, India
- Coordinates: 10.961416°N 76.954551°E
- Country: India
- State: Tamil Nadu
- Region: Kongu Nadu
- District: Coimbatore

Area
  - Total: 13.87 km^{2} (5.36 sq mi)

Population (2011)
  - Total: 95,924
  - Density: 6,916/km^{2} (17,910/sq mi)

Languages
  - Official: Tamil
- Time zone: UTC+5:30 (IST)
- PIN: 641008
- Telephone code: 91422
- Vehicle registration: TN-37, TN-66, TN-99

Kuniyamuthur is a municipality in Coimbatore South taluk of Coimbatore district in the Indian state of Tamil Nadu. It is located on the arterial road connecting Coimbatore with Palakkad. Spread across an area of 13.87 km^{2} (5.36 sq mi), it had a population of 95,924 individuals as per the 2011 census.

== Geography and administration ==
Kuniyamuthur is a municipality located in Coimbatore South taluk of Coimbatore district in the Indian state of Tamil Nadu. It is located on the arterial road connecting Coimbatore with Palakkad. Spread across an area of 21.68 km^{2} (8.37 sq mi), it is located in the western part of the state. The region has a tropical climate with hot summers and mild winters. The highest temperatures are recorded in April and May, with lowest recordings in December-January.

The municipality is headed by a chairperson, who is elected by the members, who are chosen through direct elections. The town forms part of the Thondamuthur Assembly constituency that elects its member to the Tamil Nadu legislative assembly and the Pollachi Lok Sabha constituency that elects its member to the Parliament of India.

== Demographics ==
As per the 2011 census, Kuniyamuthur had a population of 95,924 individuals across 25,270 households. The population saw a significant increase compared to the previous census in 2001 when 58,900 inhabitants were registered. The population consisted of 47,944 males and 47,980 females. About 10,119 individuals were below the age of six years. The entire population is classified as urban. The town has an average literacy rate of 89.1%. About 10.4% of the population belonged to scheduled castes.

About 42.2% of the eligible population were employed, of which majority were involved in agriculture and allied activities. Hinduism was the majority religion which was followed by 72.0% of the population, with Islam (20.9%) and Christianity (6.9%) forming significant minorities.
