= Chettipalayam =

Chettipnyam
- Panchayat town
- Location in Tamil Nadu, India
- Coordinates: 10°53′53″N 77°4′39″E
- Country: India
- State: Tamil Nadu
- District: Coimbatore

Area
  - Total: 1.68 km^{2} (0.65 sq mi)

Population (2011)
  - Total: 10,366
  - Density: 6,170/km^{2} (16,000/sq mi)

Languages
  - Official: Tamil
- Time zone: UTC+5:30 (IST)

Chettipalayam is a panchayat town in Coimbatore South taluk of Coimbatore district in the Indian state of Tamil Nadu. It is located in the north-western part of the state. Spread across an area of 1.68 km^{2} (0.65 sq mi), it had a population of 10,366 individuals as per the 2011 census.

== Geography and administration ==
Chettipalayam is located in Coimbatore South taluk of Coimbatore district in the Indian state of Tamil Nadu. Spread across an area of 1.68 km^{2} (0.65 sq mi), it is one of the 33 panchayat towns in the district. It is located in the western part of the state. The region has a tropical climate with hot summers and mild winters. The highest temperatures are recorded in April and May, with lowest recordings in December-January.

The town panchayat is headed by a chairperson, who is elected by the members, who are chosen through direct elections. The town forms part of the Kinathukadavu Assembly constituency that elects its member to the Tamil Nadu legislative assembly and the Pollachi Lok Sabha constituency that elects its member to the Parliament of India. The Kari Motor Speedway, a formula racing circuit, is located in Chettipalayam.

== Demographics ==
As per the 2011 census, Chettipalayam had a population of 10,366 individuals across 2,841 households. The population saw a marginal increase compared to the previous census in 2001 when 8,103 inhabitants were registered. The population consisted of 3,547 males and 3,674 females. About 880 individuals were below the age of six years. The entire population is classified as urban. The town has an average literacy rate of 77%. About 28.2% of the population belonged to scheduled castes.

About 43% of the eligible population were employed. Hinduism was the majority religion which was followed by 96.7% of the population, with Christianity (2.4%) and Islam (0.8%) being minor religions. Swami Satchidananda Saraswati was born in Chettipalayam.
