= Rasipalayam =

- suburb
- Location in Tamil Nadu, India Rasipalayam (India)
- Coordinates: 11°3′22″N 77°7′46″E
- Country: India
- State: Tamil Nadu
- District: Coimbatore

Languages
  - Official: Tamil
- Time zone: UTC+5:30 (IST)
- PIN: 641402

Rasipalayam is a suburb in Coimbatore of panchayat under Sulur town in Coimbatore district in the Indian state of Tamil Nadu.

Rasipalayam is a panchayat which consists of two villages called Rasipalayam, Arugampalayam both villages under this panchayat controlled by the Sulur Taluka in Coimbatore District with more than 6000 peoples. In Rasipalayam there is a Government school up to 10th Standard.

== Temples ==
- Sidhi Vinayagar
- Karana Perumal
- Athanur Amman
- Angala Amman
- arunachaleswarar thirukoil
- lakshmi narayana perumal thirukoil
- Thangamman Kovil
- Viramathi Amman Kovil
- Kamatchi Amman Kovil.
- Mahali Amman Kovil.
- Pommu Karuvanrayar Koil
- Vaaikaal vinayagar temple
