= Vadambacheri =

Vadambacheri Kamanaicken Palayam
- village
- Country: India
- State: Tamil Nadu
- District: Coimbatore

Population
  - Total: 7,500

Languages
  - Official: Tamil
- Time zone: UTC+5:30 (IST)
- PIN: 641669
- Tiruppur: Coimbatore
- Lok Sabha constituency: Coimbatore
- Vidhan Sabha constituency: Sulur

Vadambacheri is a village, and Kamanaicken Palayam in Coimbatore district, sulur Taluk in India.The Vaadambacheri Gram Panchayat is located in the Kamanaicken Palayam area of Coimbatore district, Tamil Nadu. This panchayat belongs to the Sulur Assembly constituency and the Coimbatore Lok Sabha constituency. The panchayat has a total of 7 panchayats. From these, 7 council members are elected. According to the 2011 census it had a population of 8252 in 2391 households.
