= Ashokapuram, Coimbatore =

Ashokapuram
- Neighbourhood
- Location in Tamil Nadu, India Ashokapuram (India)
- Coordinates: 11°5′24″N 76°56′32″E
- Country: India
- State: Tamil Nadu
- Region: Kongu Nadu
- District: Coimbatore

Area
  - Total: 11.81 km^{2} (4.56 sq mi)

Population (2011)
  - Total: 12,993
  - Density: 1,100/km^{2} (2,849/sq mi)

Languages
  - Official: Tamil
- Time zone: UTC+5:30 (IST)
- Vehicle registration: TN-38

Ashokapuram is a part of the city of Coimbatore in the state of Tamil Nadu, India, located 12 km north of the city center. Ashokapuram is located on a stretch of the Mettupalayam road in Coimbatore. Neighbouring places include Thudiyalur and NGGO Colony.

== Demographics ==
As of the 2001 India census, Ashokapuram had a population of 9676. Males constitute 51% of the population and females 49%. Ashokapuram has an average literacy rate of 84%, higher than the national average of 59.5%; 53% of males and 47% of females are literate. 7% of the population is under 6 years of age.
