= Malumichampatti =

Suburb of Coimbatore, Tamil Nadu, India

- Village
- Location in Tamil Nadu, India
- Coordinates: 10.905°N 77.000°E
- Country: India
- State: Tamil Nadu
- District: Coimbatore

Area
  - Total: 15.8 km^{2} (6.1 sq mi)
- Elevation: 381 m (1,250 ft)

Population (2011)
  - Total: 12,936
  - Density: 819/km^{2} (2,120/sq mi)

Languages
  - Official: Tamil
- Time zone: UTC+5:30 (IST)
- PIN: 641050
- Vehicle registration: TN-99
- Sex ratio: M 50.77% / F 49.23%
- Literacy: 86.09%

Malumichampatti (also known as Malumachampatti) is a residential village in the Coimbatore-South taluk, Coimbatore district, Tamil Nadu, India. It is along the National Highway 209. It is a village panchayat and belongs to Kinathukadavu Legislative constituency.

== Geography ==
Malumichampatti is located at 10.905°N 77.000°E. It has an average elevation of 381 m (1250 ft).

== Demography ==
The population of the village according to the 2011 census of India is 12,936 with male population of 6568 and female population of 6368. The literacy rate of the village is 86.09%.
