= Nachipalayam =

- village
- Country: India
- State: Tamil Nadu
- District: Tiruppur

Languages
  - Official: Tamil
- Time zone: UTC+5:30 (IST)

Nachipalayam is a small village located 5 km south of Vellakoil, Tiruppur district, Tamil Nadu, India. Power loom factories and spinning mills are the major livelihood for nearly 500 people.
