= Veerakeralam =

- Panchayat town
- Location in Tamil Nadu, India
- Coordinates: 11°00′25″N 76°54′42″E
- Country: India
- State: Tamil Nadu
- District: Coimbatore

Area
  - Total: 5.8 km^{2} (2.2 sq mi)

Population (2011)
  - Total: 23,841
  - Density: 4,100/km^{2} (11,000/sq mi)

Languages
  - Official: Tamil
- Time zone: UTC+5:30 (IST)

Veerakeralam is a panchayat town in Coimbatore North taluk of Coimbatore district in the Indian state of Tamil Nadu. Located in the western part of the state, it is one of the 33 panchayat towns in the district. Spread across an area of 5.8 km^{2} (2.2 sq mi), it had a population of 23,841 individuals as per the 2011 census.

== Geography and administration ==
Veerakeralam is located in Coimbatore North taluk of Coimbatore district in the Indian state of Tamil Nadu. It is one of the 33 panchayat towns in the district. Spread across an area of 5.8 km^{2} (2.2 sq mi), it is located in the western part of the state.

The town panchayat is headed by a chairperson, who is elected by the members, who are chosen through direct elections. The town forms part of the Coimbatore North Assembly constituency that elects its member to the Tamil Nadu legislative assembly and the Coimbatore Lok Sabha constituency that elects its member to the Parliament of India.

== Demographics ==
As per the 2011 census, Veerakeralam had a population of 23,841 individuals across 6,536 households. The population saw a marginal increase compared to the previous census in 2001 when 19,994 inhabitants were registered. The population consisted of 11,850 males and 11,991 females. About 2,109 individuals were below the age of six years. About 8.6% of the population belonged to scheduled castes. The entire population is classified as urban. The town has an average literacy rate of 90%.

About 40.3% of the eligible population were employed, of which majority were involved in agriculture and allied activities. Hinduism was the majority religion which was followed by 93.5% of the population, with Christianity (5.2%) and Islam (1.2%) being minor religions.
