= Kittampalayam =

Neighbourhood in Coimbatore district, Tamil Nadu, India

- Neighbourhood
- Kittampalayam, Coimbatore district, Tamil Nadu
- Coordinates: 11.2634°N 76.9221°E
- Country: India
- State: Tamil Nadu
- District: Coimbatore
- Elevation: 364.45 m (1,195.7 ft)

Population (2011)
  - Total: 4,362

Languages
  - Official: Tamil, English
  - Speech: Tamil, English
- Time zone: UTC+5:30 (IST)
- Other Neighbourhoods: Karamadai, Mettupalayam
- LS: Coimbatore
- VS: Sulur

Kittampalayam is a village near Mettupalayam in Coimbatore district, Tamil Nadu state in India.

== Location ==
The village is located with the coordinates of (11°15′48.5″N 76°55′19.7″E) near Mettupalayam.

Kittampalayam (Tamil Nadu)

== Population ==
As per 2011 census of India, Kittampalayam had a population of 4,362 persons, out of which 2,175 persons were males and females constituted 2,187 persons.

The village has nearly 500 families which include above 1300 voters.

== Crackers free ==
People of the village of Kittampalayam had resolved to refrain from using crackers during festivals or any other occasions, even during Diwali to save the lives of birds, especially bats. Thousands of bats live here in this village on trees, especially on tamarind and banyan trees. In the intention, not to disturb them, all the people from children to elderly decided crackers-free village all the time.
