= Vilankurichi =

- Neighbourhood
- Location in Tamil Nadu, India
- Coordinates: 11.071°N 77.014°E
- Country: India
- State: Tamil Nadu
- District: Coimbatore

Area
  - Total: 9.2 km^{2} (3.6 sq mi)

Population (2011)
  - Total: 24,235
  - Density: 2,600/km^{2} (6,800/sq mi)

Languages
  - Official: Tamil
- Time zone: UTC+5:30 (IST)

Vilankurichi is a census town in Coimbatore North taluk of Coimbatore district in the Indian state of Tamil Nadu. Located in the western part of the state, it is one of the seven villages in Thudiyalur block. Spread across an area of 9.2 km^{2} (3.6 sq mi), it had a population of 24,235 individuals as per the 2011 census.

== Geography and administration ==
Vilankurichi is located in Coimbatore North taluk of Coimbatore district in the Indian state of Tamil Nadu. It is one of the seven villages in Thudiyalur block. Spread across an area of 9.2 km^{2} (3.6 sq mi), it is located in the western part of the state. It forms part of the Kavundampalayam Assembly constituency that elects its member to the Tamil Nadu legislative assembly and the Coimbatore Lok Sabha constituency that elects its member to the Parliament of India.

== Demographics ==
As per the 2011 census, Vilankurichi had a population of 24,235 individuals across 6,608 households. The population saw a significant increase compared to the previous census in 2001 when 9,124 inhabitants were registered. The population consisted of 12,171 males and 12,064 females. About 2,462 individuals were below the age of six years. About 9.9% of the population belonged to scheduled castes . The entire population is classified as urban. The town has an average literacy rate of 91.1%.

About 42.8% of the eligible population were employed full-time. Hinduism was the majority religion which was followed by 87.6% of the population, with Christianity (10.6%) and Islam (1.7%) being minor religions.
