= Chinniampalayam =

Neighbourhood in Coimbatore, Tamil Nadu, India

Chinniampalayam (Chinniyampalayam, Sinniyampalayam)
- Suburb
- Location in Tamil Nadu, India
- Coordinates: 10°39′34″N 77°3′13″E
- Country: India
- State: Tamil Nadu
- Region: Kongu Nadu
- District: Coimbatore

Area
  - Total: 6 km^{2} (2.3 sq mi)

Population (2011)
  - Total: 8,232
  - Density: 1,400/km^{2} (3,600/sq mi)

Languages
  - Official: Tamil, English
- Time zone: UTC+5:30 (IST)
- Postal Code: 641062 & 641014
- Telephone code: +91-422
- Vehicle registration: TN 37

Chinniampalayam is a part of Coimbatore city. It lies on the main arterial Avinashi road, the most important road in the city. Chinniampalayam is one of the fast-growing neighbourhoods of Coimbatore. The Coimbatore International Airport is located in the outskirts of Chinniampalayam.

The star hotels Park Plaza and Le Meridien are located on Avinashi road, around the Chinniampalayam area.

== Demographics ==
As of 2001 India census, Chinniampalayam had a population of 7191. Males constitute 51% of the population and females 49%. Chinniampalayam has an average literacy rate of 83%, higher than the national average of 59.5%; with male literacy of 86% and female literacy of 79%. 7% of the population is under 6 years of age.
