= Mylampatti =

Suburb in Coimbatore, Tamil Nadu, India

Coordinates: 11°04′39″N 77°03′49″E

Mylampatti is a suburb in Coimbatore district of Tamil Nadu state in India. In 2011, it had a population of 2823.
