= Sulur taluk =

Sulur
- Taluk
- Country: India
- State: Tamil Nadu
- District: Coimbatore

Sulur taluk is a taluk of Coimbatore district of the Indian state of Tamil Nadu. The headquarters is the town of Sulur. This revenue block consist of 41 revenue villages.

== Demographics ==
According to the 2011 census, the taluk of Sulur had a population of 320,406 with 160,677 males and 159,729 females. There were 994 women for every 1,000 men. The taluk had a literacy rate of 73.9%. Child population in the age group below 6 years were 13,678 Males and 13,162 Females.

== See also ==
- Vadambacheri
