= Coimbatore-South taluk =

Taluk in Tamil Nadu, India

Coimbatore (South)
- Taluk
- Country: India
- State: Tamil Nadu
- District: Coimbatore

Coimbatore (South) taluk is a taluk of Coimbatore city of the Indian state of Tamil Nadu.

== Demographics ==
According to the 2011 census, the taluk of Coimbatore (South) had a population of 1,605,269 with 802,641 males and 802,628 females. There were 1,000 women for every 1,000 men. The taluk had a literacy rate of 81.18%. Child population in the age group below 6 years were 73,403 Males and 70,765 Females.
