= Kongu Nadu =

Kongu Nadu Kongu Mandalam
- Geographical region
- Country: India
- State(s): Tamil Nadu (Note: Kongu Nadu generally refers to the eleven districts in Western Tamil Nadu. A few sources do include parts of other districts in Tamil Nadu, south eastern Karnataka and eastern Kerala as part of the region.)
- District(s): Coimbatore, Dharmapuri, Dindigul, Erode, Kallakurichi, Karur, Krishnagiri, Namakkal, Nilgiris, Tiruppur, Salem; Parts of Tiruchirappalli and others
- Largest city: Coimbatore

Area
  - Total: 60,895 km^{2} (23,512 sq mi)

Population (2011)
  - Total: 27,443,069

Languages
  - Major: Tamil (Kongu Tamil)
  - Others: Badaga, English, Irula, Kannada, Kurumba, Malayalam, Telugu, Toda
- Time zone: Indian Standard Time

Kongu Nadu (IPA: [koŋɡɯ n̪aːɖɯ]), also known as Kongu Mandalam, is the geographical region comprising the western and north-western part of the Indian state of Tamil Nadu. The region covers an area of roughly 60,895 km^{2} (23,512 sq mi) and has a population of over 27.4 million.

The geography of the region is diverse, with the Western and Eastern Ghats traversing along the Deccan Plateau. The Kaveri, Bhavani, Amaravati and Noyyal rivers are the important non-perennial sources of water. Coimbatore, Tiruppur and Salem are the largest urban areas in the region. The majority of the people in the region speak Kongu Tamil, a variant of Tamil language. While the region is a significant contributor to the economy of the state, disparity remains within various districts in the region.

In the ancient Tamilakam, it was the seat of the Cheras, bound by Tondai Nadu in the east, Chola Nadu in the south-east and Pandya Nadu in the south. The region finds mention in Patiṟṟuppattu literature from the first century CE as a thriving industrial and commercial center with other references to the people in the second century Tamil epic Silappathikaram and other Sangam literature. The region served as the eastern entrance to the Palakkad Gap, on the principal trade route that extended from Muziris in the west coast to Arikamedu in the east. The Pandyas and Western Gangas ruled over the region later.

The medieval Cholas conquered the region in the tenth century CE. It came under the rule of the Vijayanagara Empire by the 15th century after which the Madurai Nayaks, who were the military governors of the Vijayanagara established their independent kingdom. In the latter part of the 18th century, the region came under the Kingdom of Mysore. After the defeat of Tipu Sultan in the Anglo-Mysore Wars and the Polygar Wars, the British East India Company annexed the region to the Madras Presidency in the early nineteenth century. The region played a significant role in the Indian independence movement. It became part of Madras state post Indian Independence from the British Raj with majority of the region, forming a part of Tamil Nadu later.

== Etymology ==
Kongunadu is a combination of two Tamil words meaning "Kongu country". Kongu might mean nectar or honey, probably arising from the area's early residents Kongars, who used to wear a garland made of konganam flowers, which were plentiful in this area. Kongu might have also been derived from the Tamil word Kangu, which meant edge or boundary. Since this area served as a border between the ancient Tamil kingdoms, it might have eventually transformed to Kongu. The region was also known as Kongadesam with Konga, a variant of the term Ganga to mean the land ruled by Western Gangas. The region is also known as "Kongu Mandalam" with mandalam meaning "region" in Tamil. At various times, the region was known by different names such Chola-Kerala mandalam, Adhiraja mandalam, Ezhukarai nadu, Veerachola mandalam and Onbathukarai nadu.

== History ==
Kongu Nadu was one of the territorial divisions in the ancient Tamilakam. The region was separated from the Chera Nadu by the Western Ghats, and it was part of a trade route leading across the Palghat gap called Rajakesari Peruvazhi in the Western Ghats and that extended from Muziris to Arikamedu linking the Mediterranean to East Asia. Archaeological excavations from Kodumanal on the banks of the Noyyal River show traces of civilization from 4th century BCE. Kodumanal is mentioned in Patiṟṟuppattu literature from the 1st century CE as a thriving industrial and commercial center. The Kosar people from the region are mentioned in the 2nd century Tamil epic Silappathikaram. Early Tamil Brahmi writings have been found on coins, seals and rings obtained from Amaravati River bed near Karuvur. An inscription found in a cave in Arachalur was dated to 4th Century CE and as per Iravatham Mahadevan, these were music syllables used in dance with further such sites discovered in Thadagam near Coimbatore.

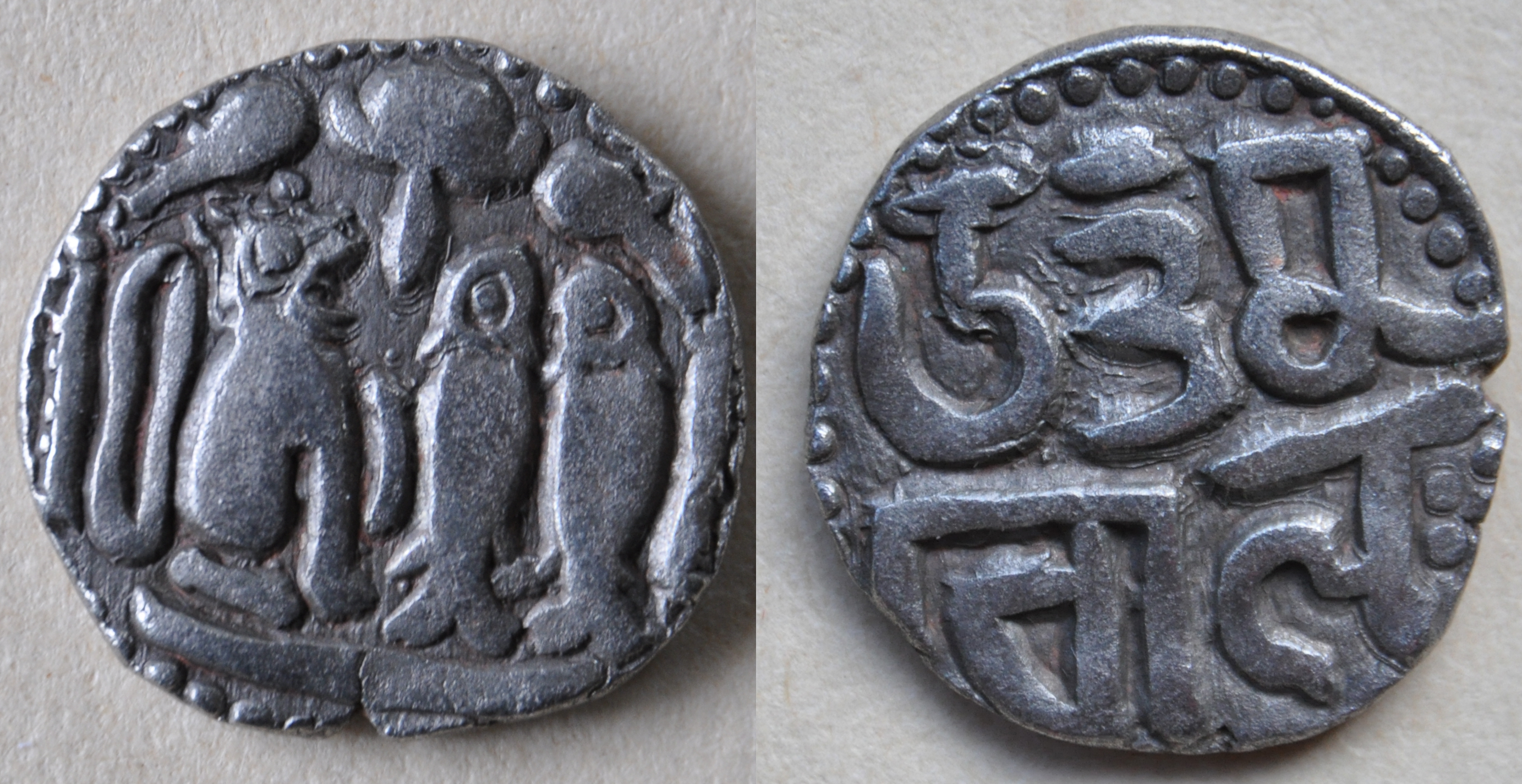
Coins from the period of Rajendra I, showing the bow and arrow emblem of the Cheras and the tiger signage of the Cholas

The region was ruled by local chieftains during the early Sangam period, who made marriage alliances with the Cheras, which resulted in a migration of significant population from Kongu Nadu to Chera Nadu. The region was ruled by the Cheras between 1st and 4th centuries with the capital at Karuvur. Chera dominance of the region began with the rule of the Palyanai Sel Kelu Kuttuvan, the son of Uthiyan Cheralathan. The medieval Pandyas made incursions into Kongu region in the 7th century, and the region came under the influence of the Pandyas during the reign of Arikesari Maravarman. During the period, parts of the region were ruled by other dynasties such as Rashtrakutas and Western Gangas.

Later, the Kongu Cheras gained influence over the region and were in alliance with the Pandyas. The medieval Cholas led by Aditya I, conquered the region in 9th century. Pandya king Maravarman Rajasimha II, who was defeated by Parantaka I, is known to have found asylum in the region. With Rajaraja I defeating the Cheras and Pandyas, the entire region came under the Chola influence in the late 10th century. While the region was directly under the control of the Imperial Cholas till 1064, the Kongu Cholas who were probably vassals or viceroys of the Cholas, ruled the region autonomously later. These rulers bore the title Konattar and adopted Chola titles and surnames.

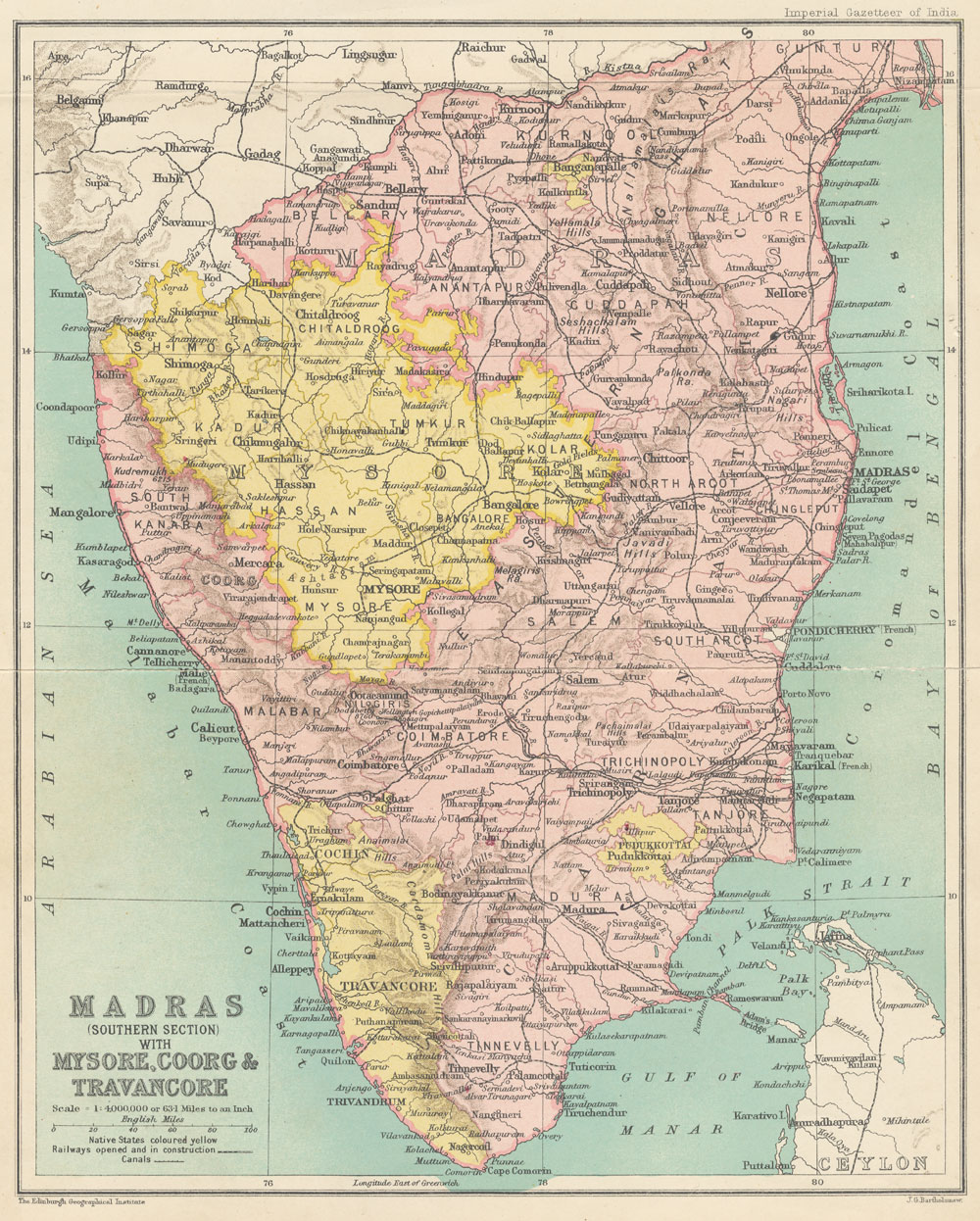
Map of South India in 1909, showing the region as a part of Madras Presidency

After the death of Vikrama Chola II in the 13 century, the Pandyas annexed the region and the inscriptions at Srirangam temple attest the victory of Jatavarman Sundara Pandyan I in the region. The rule of the Pandyas came to an end with the death of Maravarman Kulasekara Pandyan I in 1318 CE. The Hoysalas ruled the region for sometime later with Vira Someshwara having a matrimonial alliance with both Pandyas and Cholas. After the defeat of Veera Ballala III of the Hoysalas, the region came under the control of the Delhi Sultanate. In the 15th century, the Vijayanagara Empire defeated the former and established sway over the region.

After the Vijayanagara Empire fell in 1646, the region was ruled by various Nayak governors of the erstwhile Vijayanagara empire who declared independence. They introduced the Palayakkarar system under which the region was divided into 24 palayams(towns). In the latter part of the eighteenth century CE, the region came under the influence of the Kingdom of Mysore after a series of wars with the Nayaks. After the defeat of Tipu Sultan in the Anglo-Mysore Wars and the subsequent Polygar Wars, the British East India Company annexed the region to the Madras Presidency the early 19th century. The region played a prominent role in the Second Polygar war (1801), when it was the area of operations of Dheeran Chinnamalai, who fought against the rule of British East India Company. Later, the British Empire took control of the region from the British East India Company in 1857, and the region became part of the Madras Presidency.

After Indian Independence in 1947, the region became part of the Madras Province, and later as a part of Madras State in 1950. After the States Reorganisation Act of 1956, which re-organised state boundaries, majority of the region became part of the new Madras state, which would become Tamil Nadu in 1969.

== Geography ==
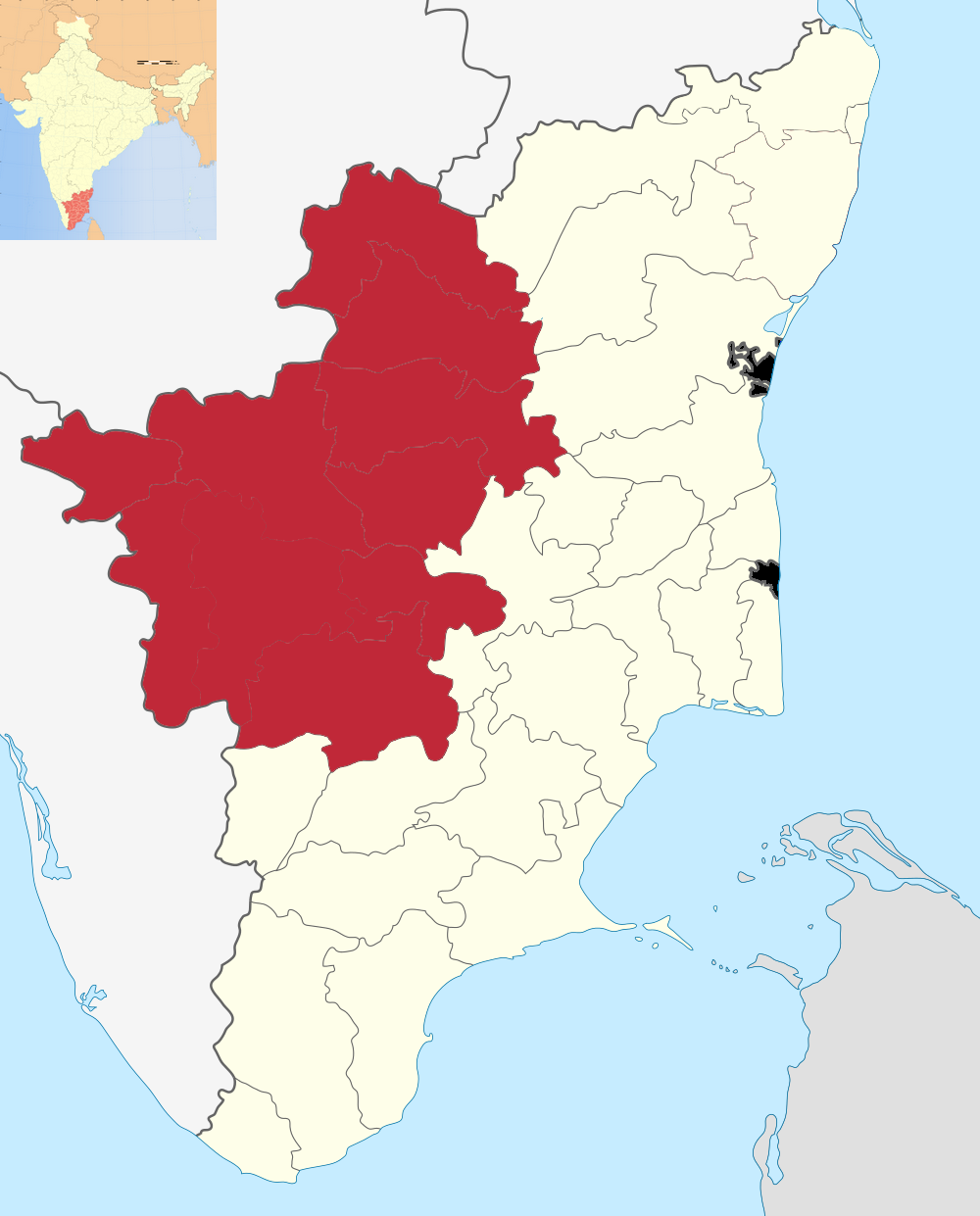
Map of Tamil Nadu showing the Kongu Nadu region

The borders of the region are not well defined as the name has been in popular use to refer the region and has not been officially defined. The region covers an estimated area of 60,895 km^{2} (23,512 sq mi) of Western and North-Western Tamil Nadu and includes the core districts of Coimbatore, Dharmapuri, Dindigul, Erode, Kallakurichi, Karur, Krishnagiri, Namakkal, Nilgiris, Tiruppur and Salem. Some sources consider parts of Tiruchirappalli district in Tamil Nadu and Chamarajanagar district in south western Karnataka as part of the region. It shares its western and northern borders with states of Kerala and Karnataka respectively, while straddling other districts of Tamil Nadu on the other sides.

The Western Ghats runs south along the western side with the Eastern Ghats cutting through the region. Both mountain ranges meet at the Nilgiri mountains in the region, which run in a crescent approximately along the borders of Tamil Nadu with northern Kerala and Karnataka. Majority of the region lies in the Deccan Plateau bound by these mountain ranges. The plateau rises to 100 metres (330 ft) in the north and to more than 1 kilometre (0.62 mi) in the south, forming a raised triangle within the downward-pointing triangle of the Indian subcontinent's coastline. Palghat Gap, a mountain pass across the Western Ghats connects the region to the west coast. The major rivers Kaveri, Bhavani, Amaravati, Noyyal and Siruvani flow through the region and are the important non-perennial sources of water. The topography also slopes gently from West to East resulting in major rivers in the region arising in the Western Ghats and flowing east. The region has a tropical climate and depends on monsoons for rainfall. Due to the south-west monsoon winds passing through the Palghat gap, the region receives most of the rainfall in the months from June to August. After a warm and foggy September, the north-east monsoon starts from October, lasting until early November.

=== Flora and fauna ===
There is a wide diversity of plants and animals in the region, resulting from its varied climates and geography. Deciduous forests are found along the Western Ghats while tropical dry forests and scrub lands are common in the interior. The Western Ghats is one of the eight hottest biodiversity hotspots in the world and a UNESCO World Heritage Site. Mudumalai National Park was the first national park in India, established in 1940 and the region has 11 national parks and wildlife sanctuaries. Bird sanctuaries including Vellode and Nanjarayan Tank are home to numerous migratory and local birds. The region has significant populations of endangered Bengal tigers and Indian elephants, being home to three Project Tiger reserves and three Project Elephant reserves. Other threatened and endangered species found in the region include grey slender loris, sloth bear, Nilgiri tahr, Nilgiri langur, lion-tailed macaque, and the Indian leopard. Lamellipalpodes kurumba and Lamellipalpodes debprasama, are two species of Lampyridae that are were described first at Nilgiris in 2025.

== Demographics ==
As per the 2011 census, the region had a population of over 27.4 million. The population is predominantly Hindu with minority Muslim and Christian population. Caste plays an important role in the region with common myths and ideas contributing to the formation of a caste identity. Gounders influence the political and economic space in the region. Incidents of persecution against Scheduled castes, ranging from discrimation based on caste, violent assault and honor killings have been reported from the region. In comparison to the southern or northern districts, the socio-economic and political divide between the Dalits and other intermediary castes is significant in the Kongu region.

=== Language ===
Kongu Tamil (also called Kangee or Kongalam), a dialect of Tamil, which is the predominantly spoken in the region. Tamil is the sole official language while English is an additional official language for communication purposes. Other languages spoken include Badaga, Toda, Irula and Kota, and Kurumba, by the tribal population of the Nilgiris district and Malayalam, Kannada, and Telugu.

== Culture ==
The people of the region upheld the Tirukkural with utmost reverence, which remained as the chief administrative text during the medieval period with several Kural inscriptions and other historical records are found across the region. Medieval Kural commentaries written by Parithiyar, Pariperumal, Kaalingar and Mallar have all been found in the Kongu Region. The 15th-century Jain inscriptions in the Ponsorimalai near Mallur cite a verse on shunning meat from the Kural, indicating that the people of the region practiced ahimsa and non-killing as chief virtues. Sati was also practiced in the region. The culture of the region was similar to that of Mysore region of south Karnataka due to historical and geographic continuity. The people of the region have a reputation for entrepreneurship. The temples in the region follow the Dravidian style. In Dravidian architecture, the temples considered of porches or Mantapas preceding the door leading to the sanctum, Gate-pyramids or Gopurams in quadrangular enclosures that surround the temple and Pillared halls used for many purposes and are the invariable accompaniments of these temples. Besides these, a South Indian temple usually has a tank called the Kalyani or Pushkarni. The Gopuram is a monumental tower, usually ornate at the entrance of the temple forms a prominent feature of Koils, Hindu temples of the Dravidian style. They are topped by the kalasam, a bulbous stone finial and function as gateways through the walls that surround the temple complex.

== Cuisine ==
Kongu Nadu cuisine is predominantly South Indian with rice as its base and includes a unique collection of recipes created by the people residing in the Kongu region. The cuisine includes cereals like maize, ragi, samai, cholam, kambu, kezhvaragu, and different kinds of pulses, millets and sesame. Millets were staple food items in the region until the Green Revolution increased the usage of Ponni rice as a staple. The traditional way of eating a meal involves being seated on the floor and having the food served on a banana leaf. Eating on banana leaves is a custom thousands of years old, imparts a unique flavor to the food, and is considered healthy. Kongu Nadu cuisine does not involve marination of the raw materials, which results in imparting a unique taste and texture to the food. Turmeric grown in the region forms an important ingredient in the cuisine. The earlier Kongu people were mostly vegetarians for religious reason.

Idly, dosa, paniyaram and appam are popular dishes. Opputtu is a sweet made with rice, chickpea, palm or cane jaggery, cardamom and ghee. Ariseemparuppu (literally translated as Rice and dal) is a unique dish originated from the region. Kaalaan is a popular dish prepared by simmering deep-fried mushrooms (usually chopped) in a spicy broth until it reaches a porridge-like consistency; the dish is served sprinkled with chopped onions and coriander leaves.

== Economy ==
Kongu Nadu had a flourishing economy from ancient times and had trade contacts with foreign nations. Kodumanal was a 2,500-year-old industrial colony discovered by archaeologists, located along an ancient Roman trade route. A Chola highway called Rajakesari Peruvazhi ran through the region. Agriculture is the primary occupation in the region. Rice is the staple food and major crop in the region. Some of the main crops cultivated include sugarcane, spices, chilli, banana, cotton, turmeric, millets and pulses. Other plantation crops include coffee, tea, rubber, betel, areca nut and coconut. and 85% of the natural rubber production in the country. Other major agricultural products include poultry and silk.

Coimbatore is amongst the major industrial hubs of India. The city supplies two-thirds of India's requirements of motors and pumps, and is one of the largest exporters of wet grinders, auto components, and jewellery. Textiles is a major industry in the region. Tiruppur home to more than 10,000 garment manufacturing industries, employing over 600,000 people, and as of 2021-22, the city exported garments worth 5.1 billion USD, contributing to nearly 54% of the all the textile exports from India.

== Demand for statehood ==
There has been demands for the formation a separate state of Kongu Nadu, which would include western Tamil Nadu districts. Various political parties occasionally raise similar demand. Local caste based political outfits Kongunadu Munnetra Kazhagam and Kongu Vellala Goundergal Peravai also supported the demand.
