= Culture of Coimbatore =

Culture of Coimbatore is based on the culture of the Kongu Nadu region and is distinctly unique. Being a cosmopolitan city, the culture of the city reflects its diverse population which has resulted in a unique blend. Though it is generally considered a traditional city, Coimbatore is more diverse and cosmopolitan than other cities in Tamil Nadu. Traditional music, dance and all other art forms of Tamil Nadu are very popular in the city. One can find a unique blend of culture from traditional foods to fast foods, from ancient temple architecture to modern high-rises and from classical music and dance to the growing nightlife in the city. Popularly called as the Manchester of South India, the city is known for its industries and has developed a reputation for entrepreneurship.

== Music and arts ==
The city conducts its own music festival every year. Art, dance and music concerts are held annually during the months of September and December (Tamil calendar month – Margazhi). The heavy industrialisation of the city has also resulted in the growth of trade unions. Swamikannu Vincent, who had built the first cinema of south India in Coimbatore, introduced the concept of Tent Cinema in which a tent was erected on an open land to screen the films. Central Studios was set up in 1935 while S. M. Sriramulu Naidu established Pakshiraja Studios in 1945. Coimbatore also houses a number of museums and art galleries like G.D. Naidu Museum & Industrial Exhibition, H A Gass Forest Museum, Government Museum, Kadhi Gandhi Gallery and Kasthuri Srinivasan Art Gallery and Textile Museum.

Religion in Coimbatore (2011)
Religion	Percent(%)
Hindu	83.3%
Muslim	8.6%
Christian	7.5%
Other or not stated	0.6%

== People ==
The city's population is predominantly Hindu, along with a small group of Muslim population. Christians, Sikhs and Jains are also present in small numbers. Coimbatore also has a large number of Telugus, Kannadigas, Malayalis, mainly from Palakkad and North Indians, mainly Gujaratis, who are engaged in trade and commerce. During the 1970s the city witnessed a population explosion as a result of migration fueled by increased economic growth and job opportunities.

Popular places of worship

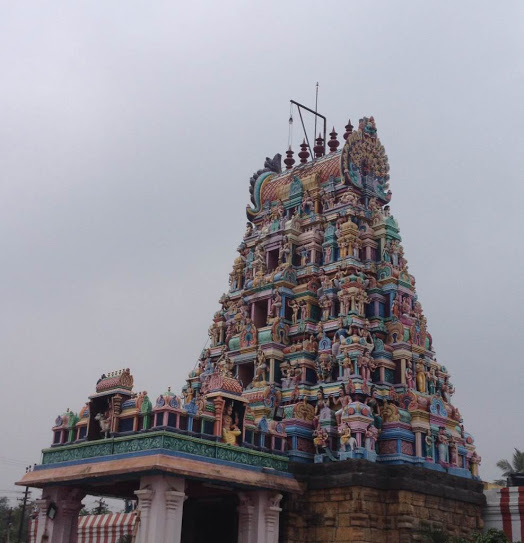
Perur Pateeswarar Temple

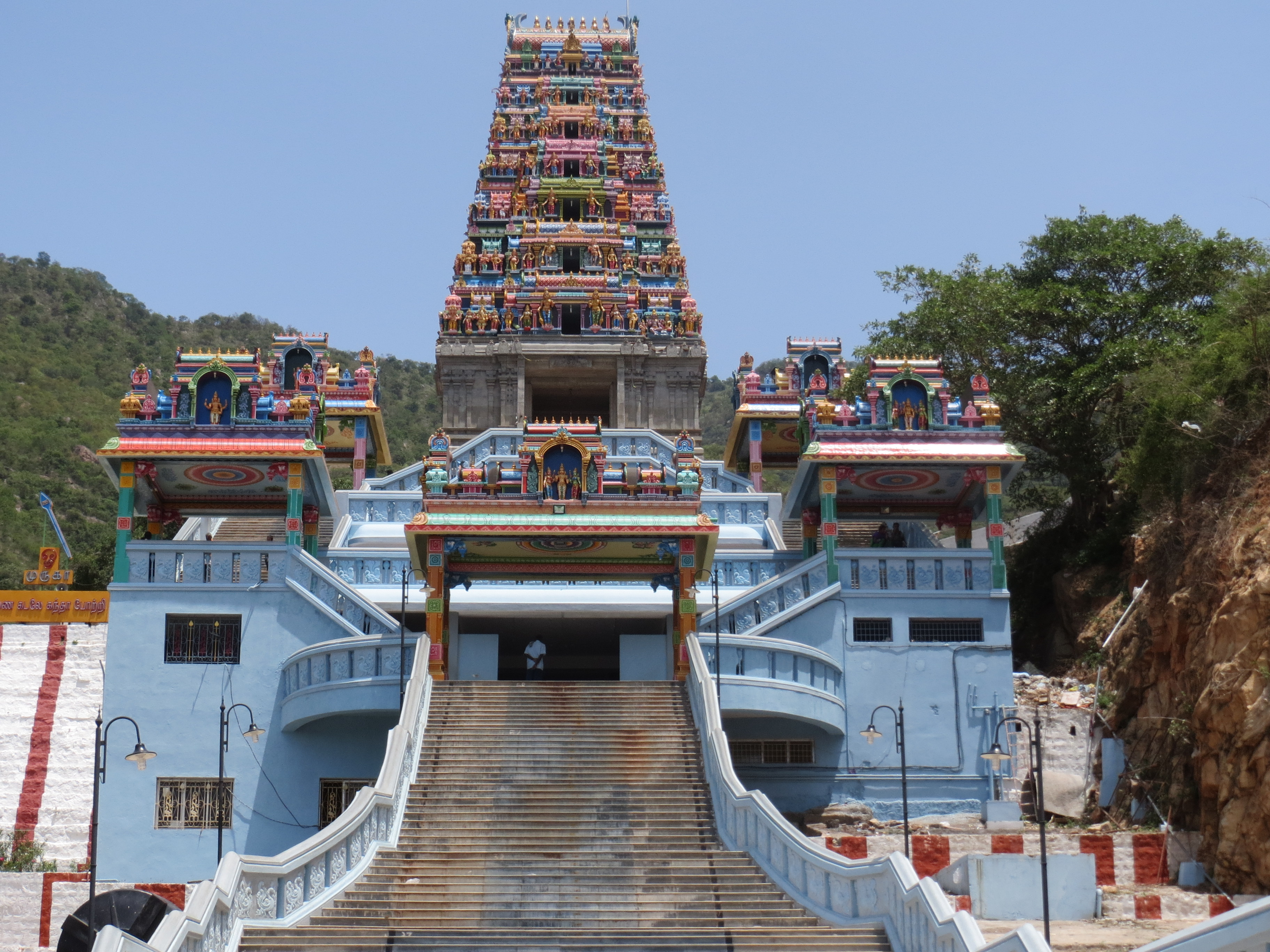
Marudamalai Murugan Temple

== Places of worship ==
The Mariamman festivals at the city's numerous Mariamman temples are major events in summer. There are numerous temples in and around the city popular among those include Major Hindu temples in the city include the Perur Patteeswarar Temple, Naga Sai Mandir, Koniamman Temple, Thandu Mariamman Temple, Eachanari Vinayagar Temple, Puliakulam Temple, Marudamalai Murugan Temple, Loga Nayaga Shaniswara Temple, Ashtamsa Varadha Anjaneyar Temple, Masani Amman Temple, Karamadai Ranganathar Temple, Dhyanalinga Yogic Temple and Adiyogi Shiva. The mosques on Oppanakara Street and Big Bazaar Street date back to the 18th century CE. Christian missions date back to the 17th century when permission was granted by the Nayak rulers to set up churches in the region. Sikh Gurudwaras and Jain temples are also present in Coimbatore.

== Cuisine ==
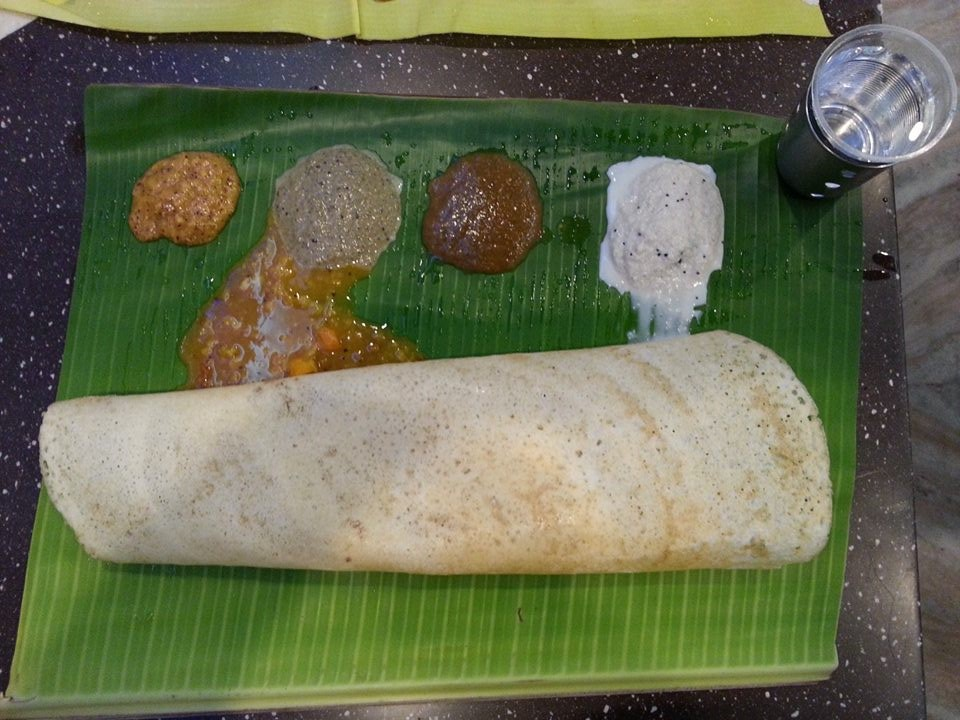
Dosa with chutney and sambar traditionally served in banana leaf

Coimbatore cuisine is predominantly south Indian with rice as its base. Most local restaurants still retain their rural flavor, with many restaurants serving food over a banana leaf. Eating on a banana leaf is an old custom and imparts a unique flavor to the food and is considered healthy. North Indian, Chinese and continental cuisines are also available. Idly, dosa, paniyaram and appam are popular dishes.

Coimbatore has an active street food culture and various cuisine options for dining. Arisi paruppu sadam and sambar sadam, made from a mixture of dal and rice, is a recipe that existed from the 4th century CE that is unique to the area. Ariseemparuppu or arisi paruppu satham (literally translated as Rice and dal) originated from Coimbatore and the people of the city celebrate January 8 as national Aruseemparuppu day, after given light by a popular influencer and food consultant. Kaalaan is a popular dish prepared by simmering deep-fried mushrooms (usually chopped) in a spicy broth until it reaches a porridge-like consistency; the dish is served sprinkled with chopped onions and coriander leaves. Chaats made from potatoes and a mix of other vegetables and spices are also popular.

== Language ==
Tamil is the official language and Kongu Tamil (also called Kangee or Kongalam), a dialect, is predominantly spoken. The speciality of Kongu Tamil is the use of the alveolar ற – Tra/Dra (as in the English word track) instead of retroflex T/D (ட) of standard Tamil. For example, 'ennuDaya' (mine) of standard Tamil is pronounced enRa in the Kongu dialect. Additionally the use of guttural nasal (ங்) that sounds "ng" as in the English word Gang, is more prevalent in Kongu Tamil, leading to situations where the grammar of Kongu Tamil would not fit into the grammar of standard Tamil (as laid down in authoritative treatises like Tolkappiyam and Nannool). One of the examples is the use of ங் to end a word like வாங் "vaang", means 'come' expressed in a respectful tone, which in standard Tamil would be "vaanga". Coimbatore also has a significant number of Telugus, Kannada, Malayalis, and North Indians mainly Gujaratis., As per the 2011 census, Tamil is the most spoken language with 710,326 speakers, followed by Telugu (173,136), Kannada (102,000), Malayalam (76,485). Other languages spoken in the city include Urdu (15,484) and Hindi (13,608).

== Festivals ==
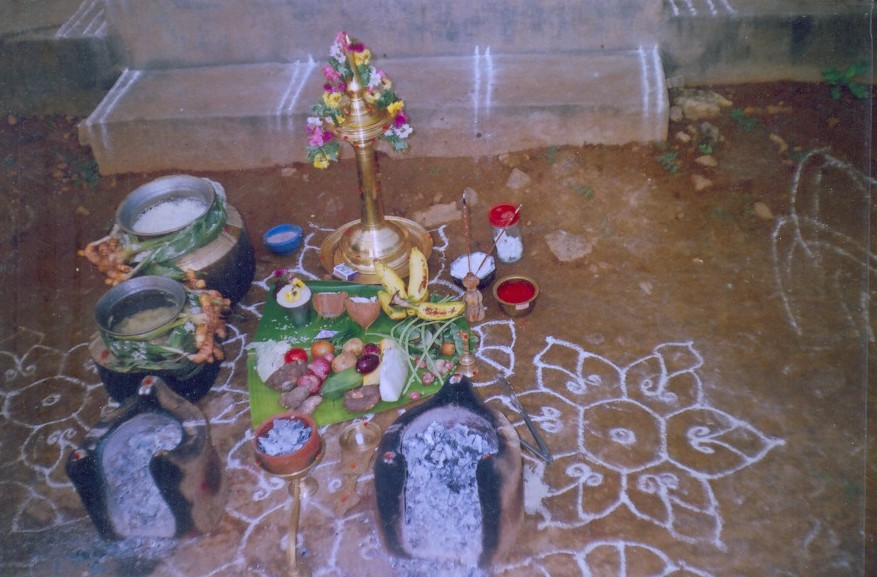
Pongal, the major festival in the region

Being a cosmopolitan city, almost all major festivals like Deepavali, Eid and Christmas are celebrated here. Thai Pongal, celebrated in the month of January, is an important festival of and is celebrated over a period of five days. Puthandu signifying the beginning of the Tamil calendar usually falls in April and is celebrated widely. Onam is also celebrated with much fanfare due to a considerable Malayali immigrant population. Koniamman Temple car festival is celebrated in the month of March each year. Perur Pateeswarar Temple car festival is celebrated in the month of March each year and seedling planting festival is celebrated each year in the month of June. Vinayagar Chathurthi is celebrated in major temples such as Puliakulam Vinayagar Temple and Eachanari Vinayagar Temple. Thaipusam is another major festival celebrated in Murugan temples. Aravan Festival is celebrated as a "Community Reconciliation Festival" in various areas.
