= Cosmopolitan Club (Coimbatore) =

Coimbatore Cosmopolitan Club
- Formation: 1891
- Type: Private club
- Headquarters: Race Course, Coimbatore
- Location: India

The Cosmopolitan Club in Coimbatore, Tamil Nadu, India is a club started in 1891 by a group of local citizens. It is located in Race Course Road, in the city of Coimbatore.

== History ==
The land for the club was purchased from Jayashree V.Murthy of Sulur on 25 July 1891. To an existing small shed, a clubhouse, a billiards room, card rooms and tennis courts were added. The front Porch was called Verandah club. A large tree in the vicinity was main meeting place of its members' also called as Wisdom Tree.

== Facilities ==
- Tennis courts
- Badminton court
- Billiards and Bridge room
- Library
- Bar, Party halls and Accommodation

== Notable members ==
- C. S. Rathinasabapathy Mudaliar – Industrialist, often regarded as Father of Coimbatore.
- C. Subramaniam – Former Union Minister and former Governor of Maharashtra
- R. K. Shanmugam Chettiar – India's first Finance Minister and Industrialist
- Nirupama Vaidyanathan – Tennis player
