= Lotus News =

Indian Tamil-language television news channel

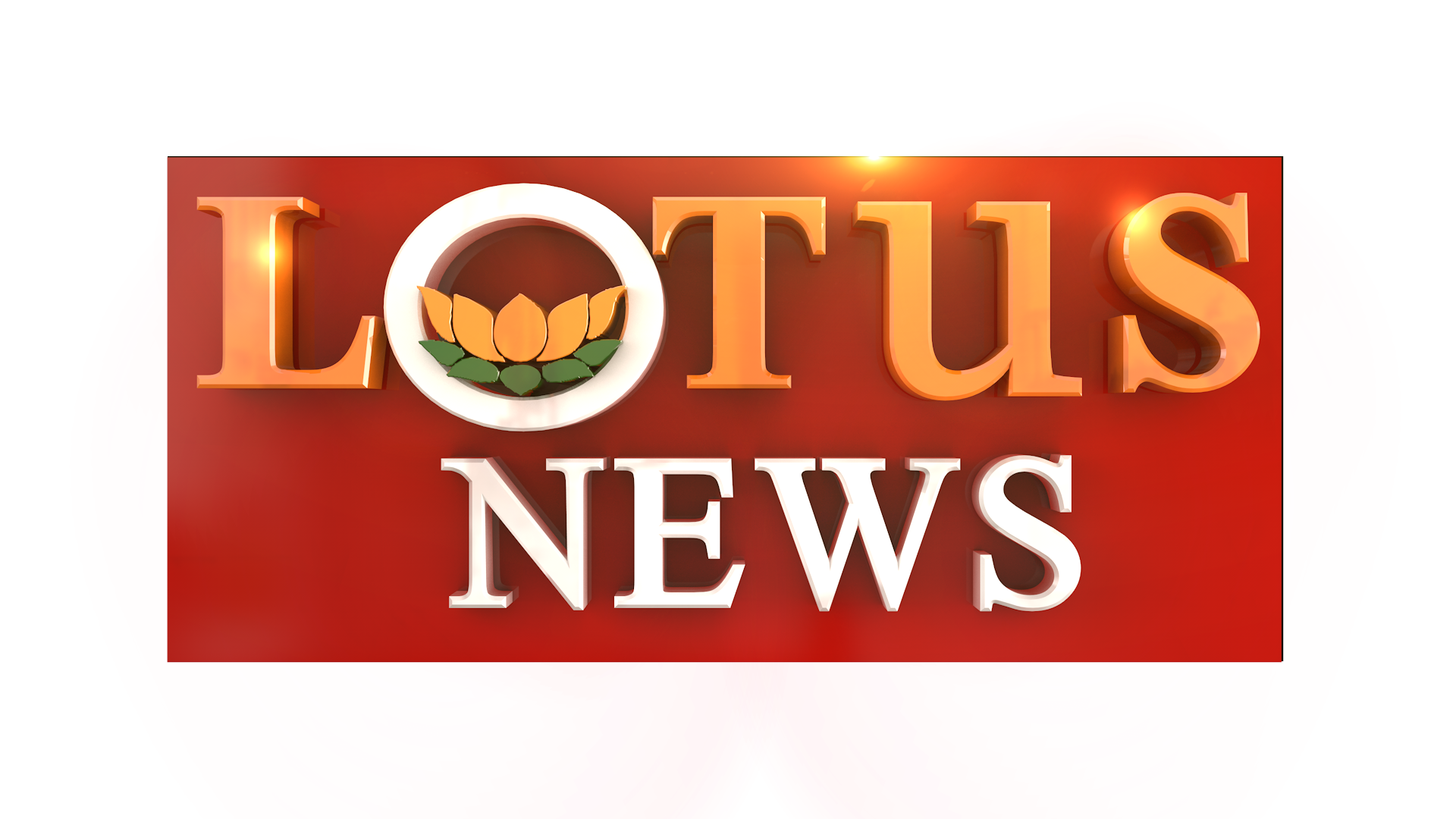
- Country: India
- Headquarters: Coimbatore, Tamil Nadu, India

Programming
- Language(s): Tamil

Ownership
- Owner: Seventh Vision India Private Limited

History
- Launched: 11 October 2012
- Founder: Dr.G.K.S.Selvakumar
- Closed: April 2021 (Satellite Only)

Links
- Website: Lotus News

Lotus News was a Tamil news satellite channel headquartered at Coimbatore, Tamil Nadu, India.

== History ==
Lotus News was launched on 11 October 2012 by a consortium headed by industrialist and Former BJP State General Secretary Dr.G.K.S.Selvakumar.. It was the first Tamil news satellite channel to have its base outside Chennai and also the first satellite channel to have its base in Coimbatore. The channel has its slogan and motto உண்மை மலரட்டும்.

The Channel Introduced "Express News" Pattern in Tamil News Industry.

The Channel Introduced World's First Transgender News Anchor Padmini Prakash on 15 August 2014.

It also Introduced Visually Challenged Master.Sri Ramanujam as a News Anchor by Using Braille Method.

== Controversies ==
The former Managing director Bharathi Mohan filed a cheating complaint against the Tamil Nadu BJP Secretary and Director of the Channel G.K. Selvakumar. The complaint stated that G.K Selva kumar had faked his signature and sold his shares over 5 crores. In response, Selvakumar said it was Bharathi Mohan's intention to defame him and said he would file a defamation case against mohan after a consultation with his lawyers.

The director of the channel and BJP Secretary G.K Selvakumar was detained at the Coimbatore airport for carrying a bullet in his bag on 26 June 2018. Selvakumar plead that he had a licensed weapon and had carried the bag that contained the bullets by mistake. He was allowed to board the flight, after he handed over the bullet to his driver.
