= Coimbatore =

City in Tamil Nadu, India

Coimbatore Kovai
- Metropolis
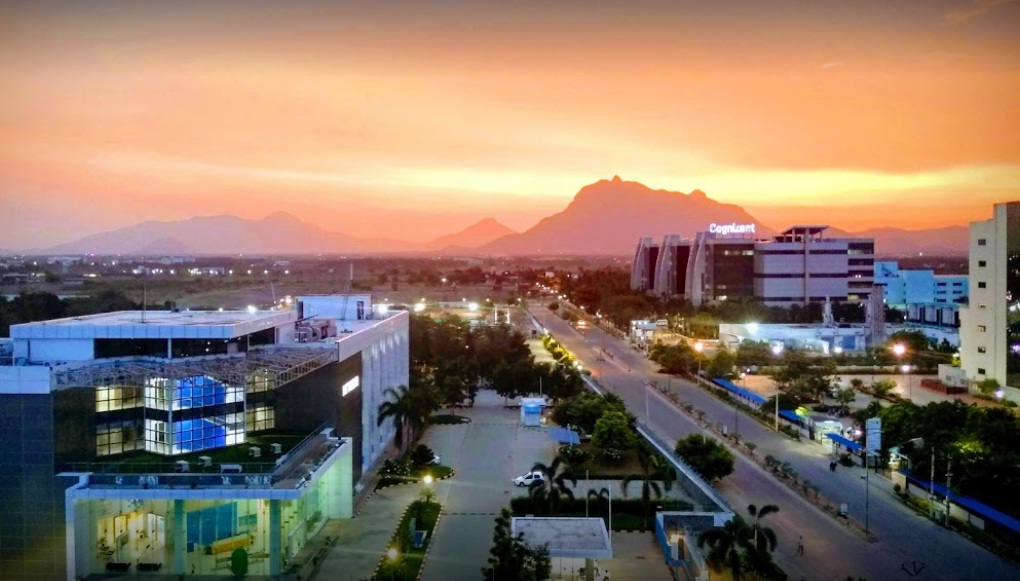
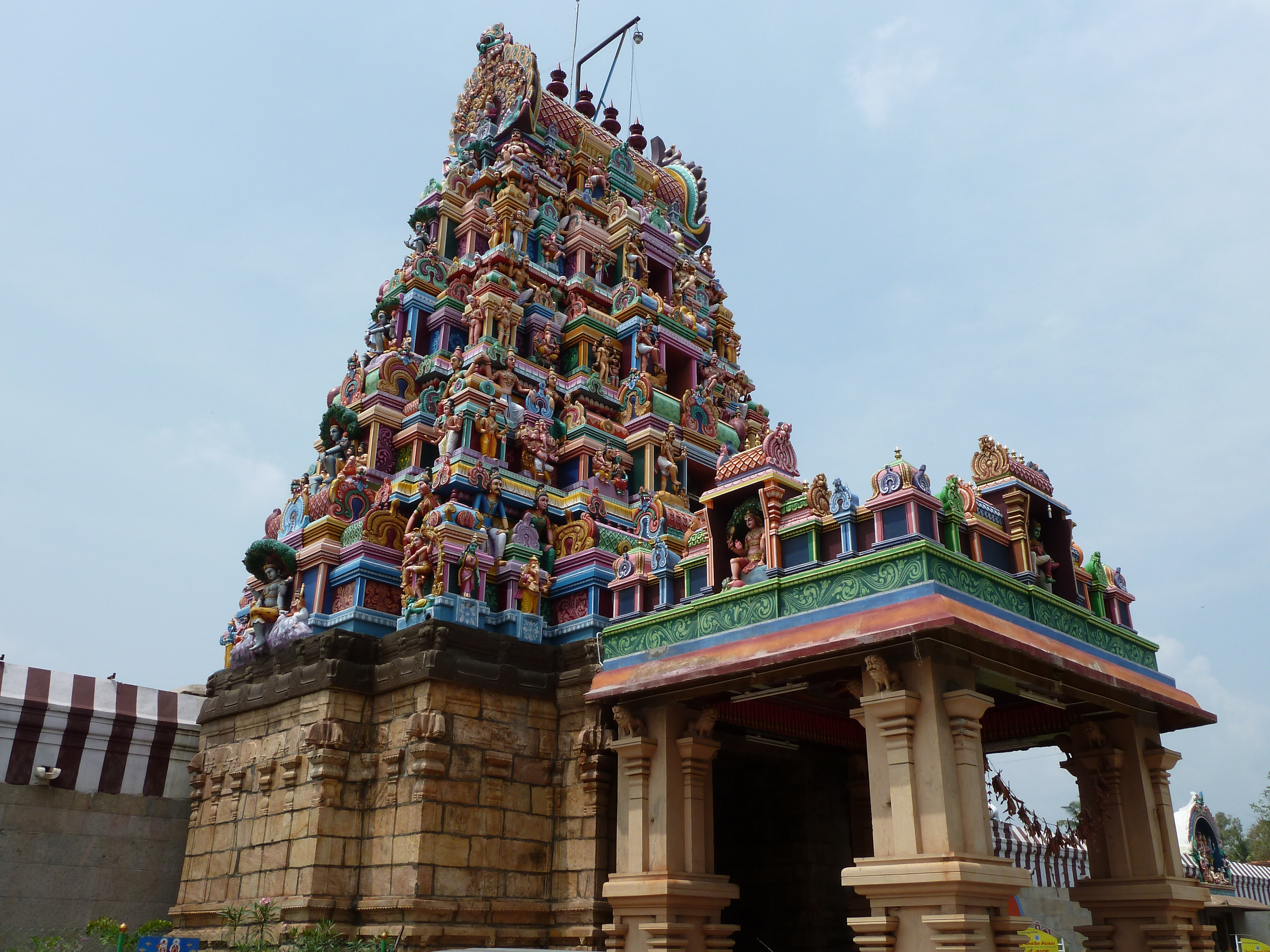
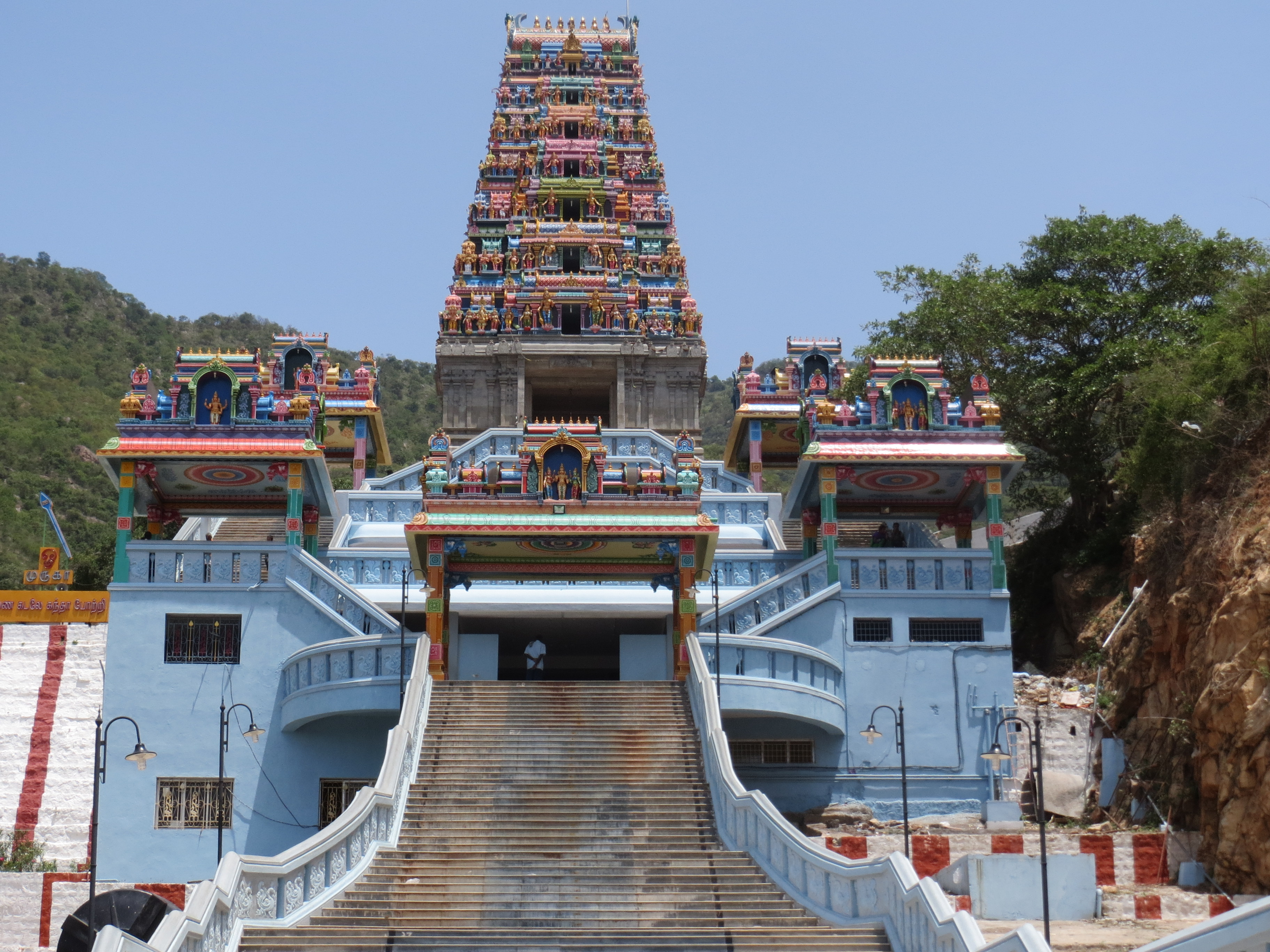
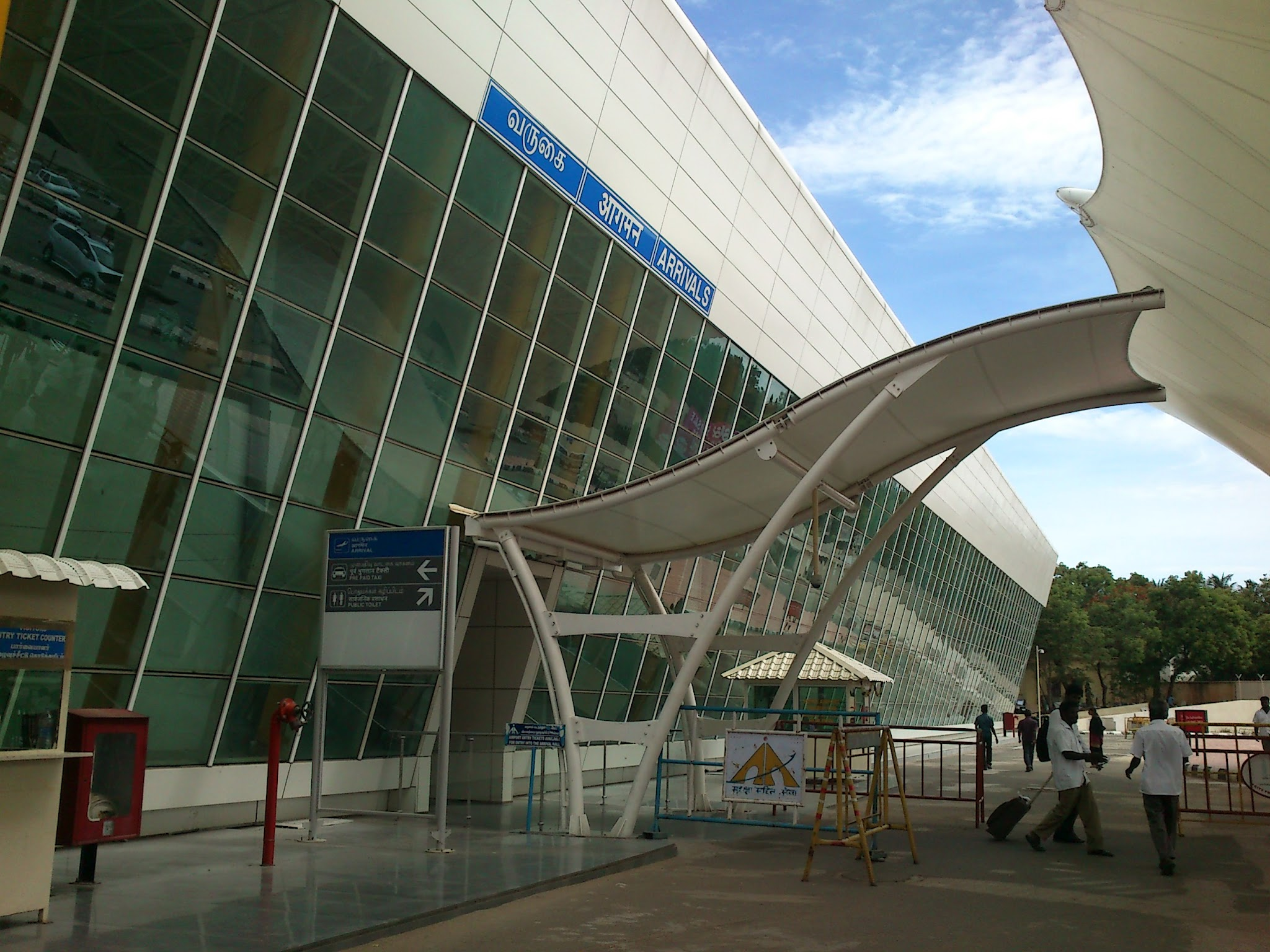
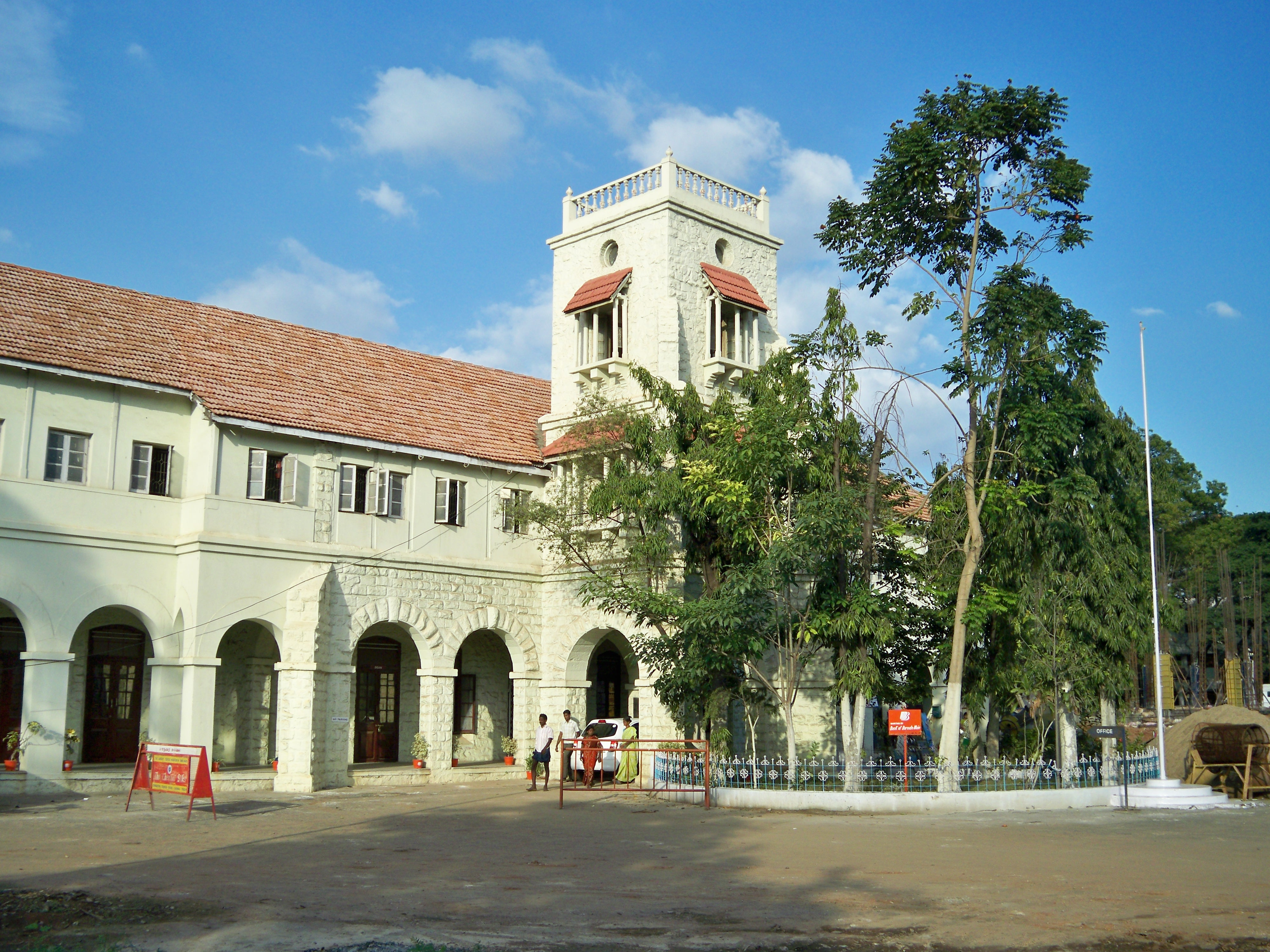
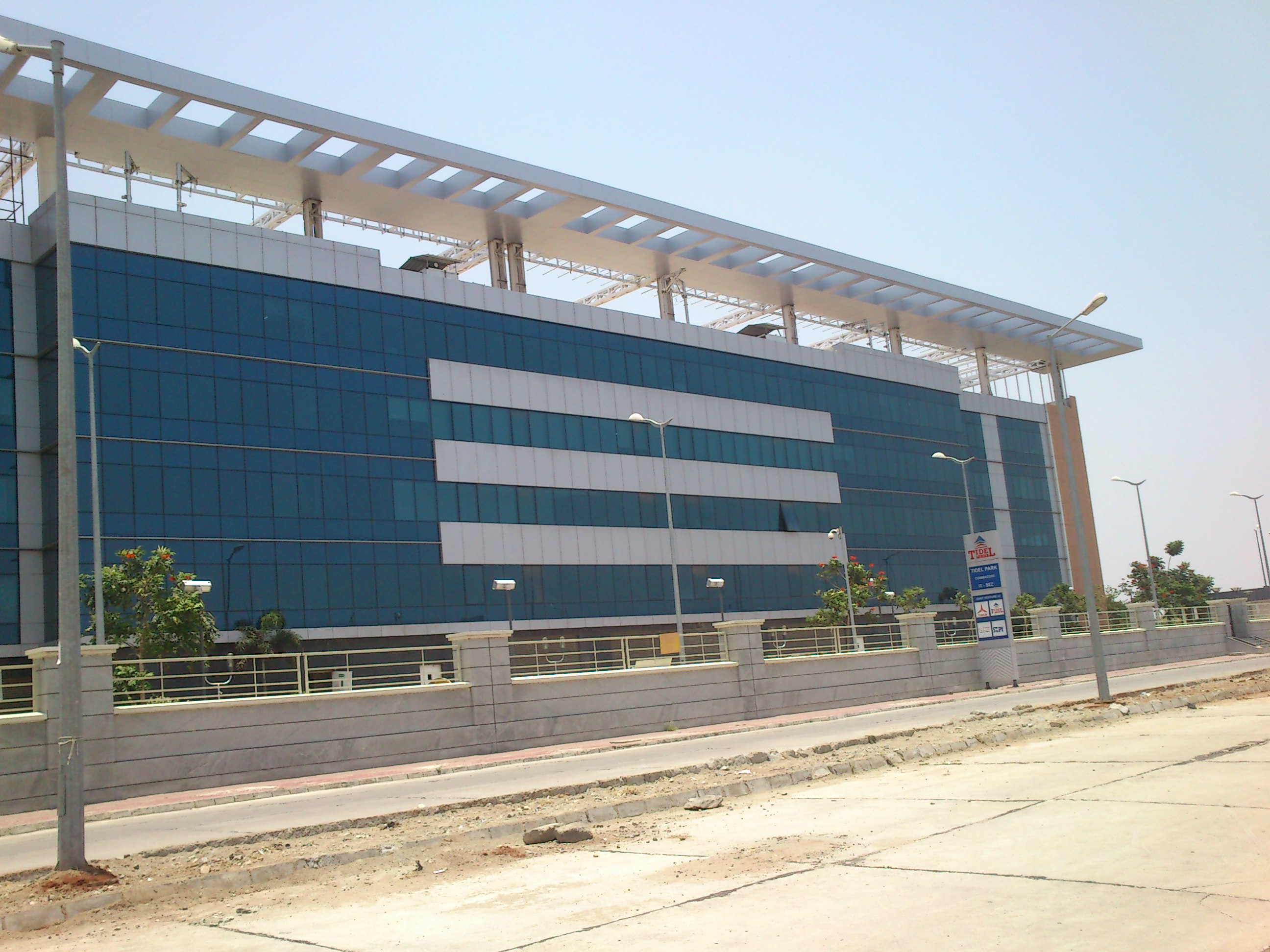
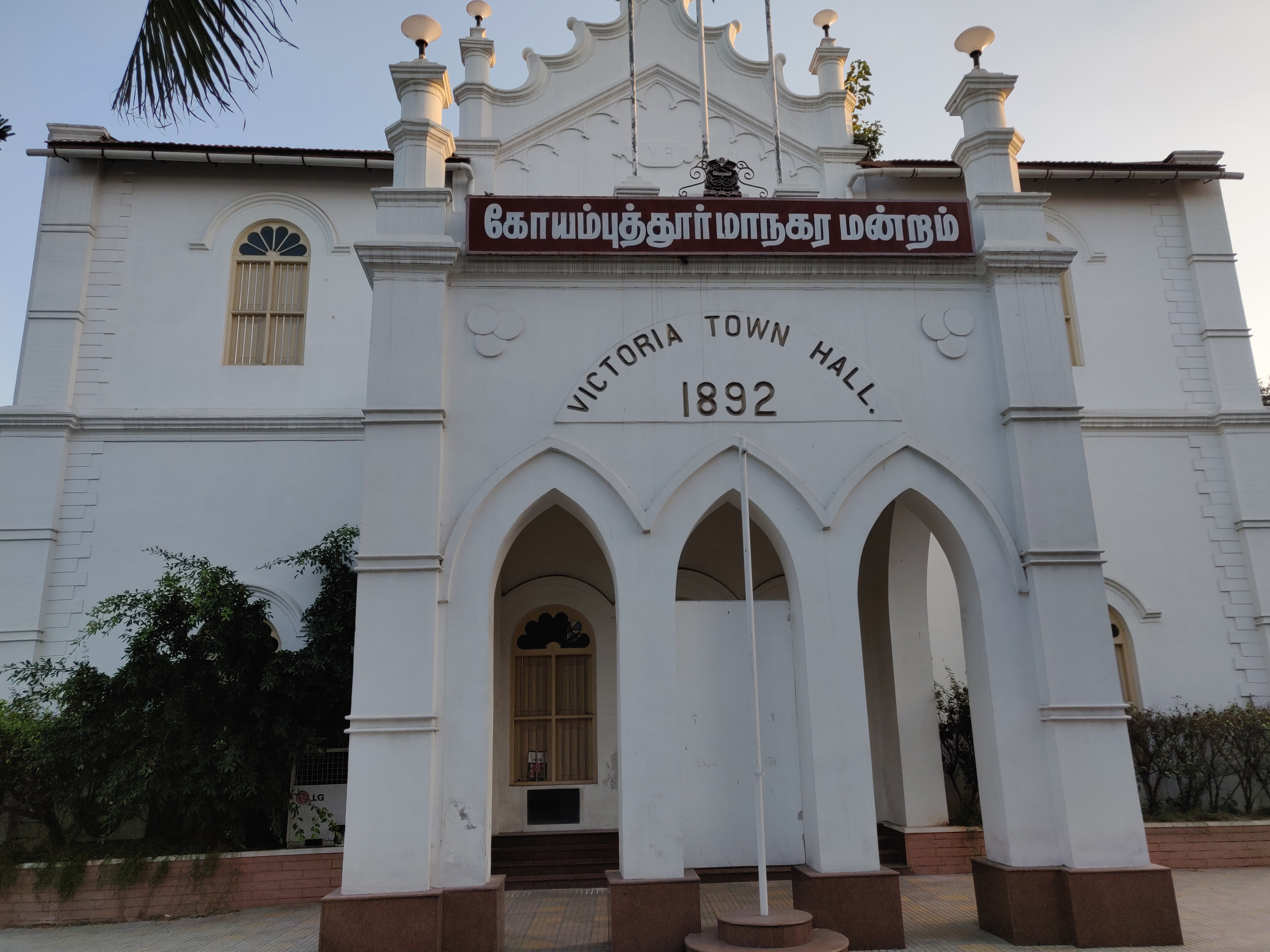
- A Special Economic Zone in the city Perur Pateeswarar Temple Maruthamalai Murugan Temple Coimbatore International Airport Coimbatore Medical College TIDEL Park Town Hall
- Nickname: Manchester of South India
- Coordinates: 11°00′03″N 76°57′48″E
- Country: India
- State: Tamil Nadu
- District: Coimbatore

Government
  - Type: Municipal Corporation
  - Body: Coimbatore Municipal Corporation
  - Mayor: R. Ranganayaki (DMK)

Area
  - Metropolis: 257.04 km^{2} (99.24 sq mi)
  - Metro: 696.25 km^{2} (268.82 sq mi)
  - Rank: 2
- Elevation: 427 m (1,401 ft)

Population (2011)
  - Metropolis: 1,601,438
  - Rank: 24th
  - Density: 6,441/km^{2} (16,680/sq mi)
  - Metro: 2,136,916
  - Metro rank: 16th
- Demonym: Coimbatorean
- Time zone: UTC+5:30 (IST)
- PIN: 641XXX
- STD Code: +91-0422
- Vehicle registration: TN 37 (South), TN 38 (North), TN 66 (Central), TN 99 (West), TN 37Z (Sulur)
- Official language: Tamil, English
- GDP (2022-23): ₹156,287 crore (US$19.88 billion)
- Website: coimbatore.nic.in
- Population Note: The population as per 2011 census calculated basis pre-expansion city area of 105.60 sq.km. was 1,050,721. Post expansion of city limits to 257.04 sq.km., the population including the new city limits was provided by Government of India for the smart city challenge was 1,601,438. The 2011 census data for the urban agglomeration is available and has been provided.

Coimbatore (Tamil: Kōyamputtūr, IPA: [koːjɐmbut̪ːuːɾ]), also known as Kovai (IPA: [koːʋaj]), is a metropolitan city in the Indian state of Tamil Nadu. It is located on the banks of the Noyyal River and surrounded by the Western Ghats. It is the second largest city in Tamil Nadu after Chennai in terms of population and the 16th largest urban agglomeration in India as per the census 2011. It is the administrative capital of Coimbatore District and is administered by the Coimbatore Municipal Corporation which was established in 1981.

The region around Coimbatore was ruled by the Cheras during the Sangam period between the 1st and the 4th centuries and it served as the eastern entrance to the Palakkad Gap, the principal trade route between the west coast and Tamil Nadu. Coimbatore was located along the ancient trade route Rajakesari Peruvazhi that extended from Muziris to Arikamedu in South India. The medieval Cholas conquered the Kongu Nadu in the 10th century. The region was ruled by the Vijayanagara Empire in the 15th century followed by the Nayaks who introduced the Palayakkarar system under which the Kongu Nadu region was divided into 24 Palayams. In the later part of the 18th century, the Coimbatore region came under the Kingdom of Mysore and following the defeat of Tipu Sultan in the Anglo-Mysore Wars, the British East India Company annexed Coimbatore to the Madras Presidency in 1799. The Coimbatore region played a prominent role in the Second Poligar War (1801) when it was the area of operations of Dheeran Chinnamalai.

In 1804, Coimbatore was established as the capital of the newly formed Coimbatore district and in 1866, it was accorded municipality status with Robert Stanes as its chairman. The city experienced a textile boom in the early 19th century due to the decline of the cotton industry in Mumbai. Post Independence, Coimbatore has seen a rapid growth due to industrialisation and is one of the largest exporters of jewellery, wet grinders, poultry and auto components. The Coimbatore Wet Grinder and the Kovai Cora Cotton are recognised as Geographical Indications by the Government of India. Being a hub of textile industry in South India, the city is referred to as the "Manchester of South India".

Coimbatore was ranked as the best emerging city in India by India Today in the 2014 annual survey, fourth among Indian cities in investment climate by Confederation of Indian Industry and 17th among the top global outsourcing cities by Tholons. Coimbatore has been selected as one of the Indian cities to be developed as a smart city under the Smart Cities Mission and AMRUT by Government of India. Coimbatore regularly features among the top ten best cities to live in India and is amongst the top three safest cities in India according to National Crime Records Bureau report in 2023.

== Etymology ==
According to one theory, "Coimbatore" is a derivation of Kōvanputtūr (lit. 'new town of Kovan'), after chieftain Kovan or Koyan, evolved into Kōyamputtūr and later anglicised as Coimbatore. Another theory states that the name could have been derived from Kovaiamma. The word evolved from Koyamma, the goddess worshipped by Koyan which became Koniamma and later Kovaiamma.

== History ==
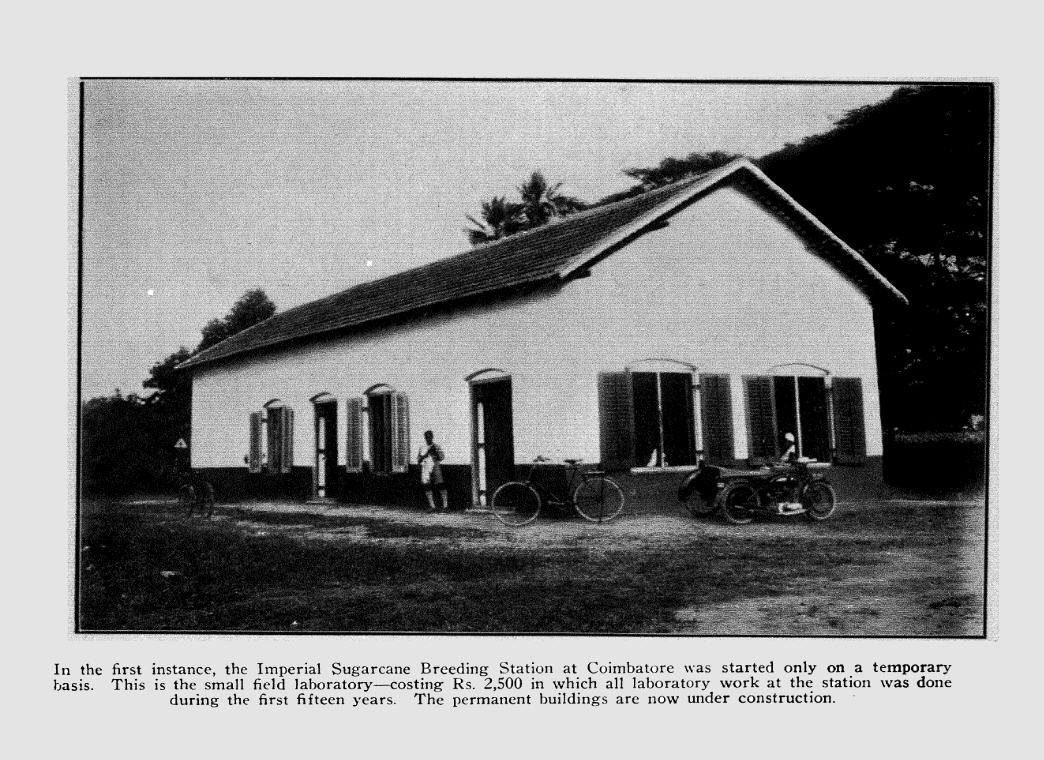
The Sugarcane Breeding Institute at Coimbatore, 1928

The region around Coimbatore was ruled by the Cheras during Sangam period between c. 1st and the 4th centuries CE and it served as the eastern entrance to the Palakkad Gap, the principal trade route between the west coast and Tamil Nadu. The Kosar tribe mentioned in the 2nd century CE Tamil epic Silappathikaram and other poems in Sangam literature is associated with the Coimbatore region. The region was located along an ancient Roman trade route that extended from Muziris to Arikamedu. The Kongu Nadu region came under the influence of the medieval Pandyas in the 7th century. The medieval Cholas conquered the region in the 10th century, and a Chola highway called Rajakesari Peruvazhi ran through the region. Much of Tamil Nadu came under the rule of the Vijayanagara Empire by the 15th century. In the 1550s, Madurai Nayaks, who were the military governors of the Vijaynagara Empire, took control of the region. After the Vijayanagara Empire fell in the 17th century, the Madurai Nayaks established their state as an independent kingdom. They introduced the Palayakkarar system under which Kongu Nadu region was divided into 24 Palayams (towns).

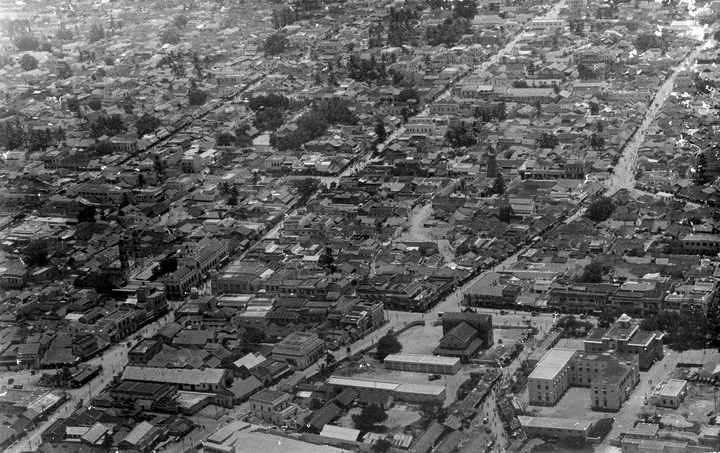
Aerial view of the city, circa 1930

In the latter part of the 18th century, the region came under the Kingdom of Mysore, following a series of wars with the Madurai Nayak dynasty. After the defeat of Tipu Sultan in the Anglo-Mysore Wars, the British East India Company annexed Coimbatore to the Madras Presidency in 1799. The Coimbatore region played a prominent role in the Second Poligar War (1801), when it was the area of operations of Dheeran Chinnamalai. On 24 November 1804, Coimbatore was established as the capital of the newly formed Coimbatore district and in 1866 it was accorded municipality status. Sir Robert Stanes became the first chairman of the Coimbatore City Council. The region was hard hit during the Great Famine of 1876–78 resulting in nearly 200,000 famine related fatalities. The first three decades of the 20th century saw nearly 20,000 plague-related deaths and acute water shortage.

The decline of the cotton industry in Mumbai fuelled an economic boom in Coimbatore in the 1920s and 1930s. The region played a significant role in the Indian independence movement with Mahatma Gandhi visiting the city three times. Coimbatore was the base of operations for such political figures as S. P. Narasimhalu Naidu, R. K. Shanmukham Chetty, C. S. Ratnasabhapathy Mudaliar and C. Subramaniam during the independence movement. Post independence, Coimbatore has seen rapid growth due to industrialisation and in 1981 it was constituted as a municipal corporation. On 14 February 1998, the radical Islamist group Al Ummah bombed 11 places across the city killing 58 people and injuring more than 200.

== Geography ==
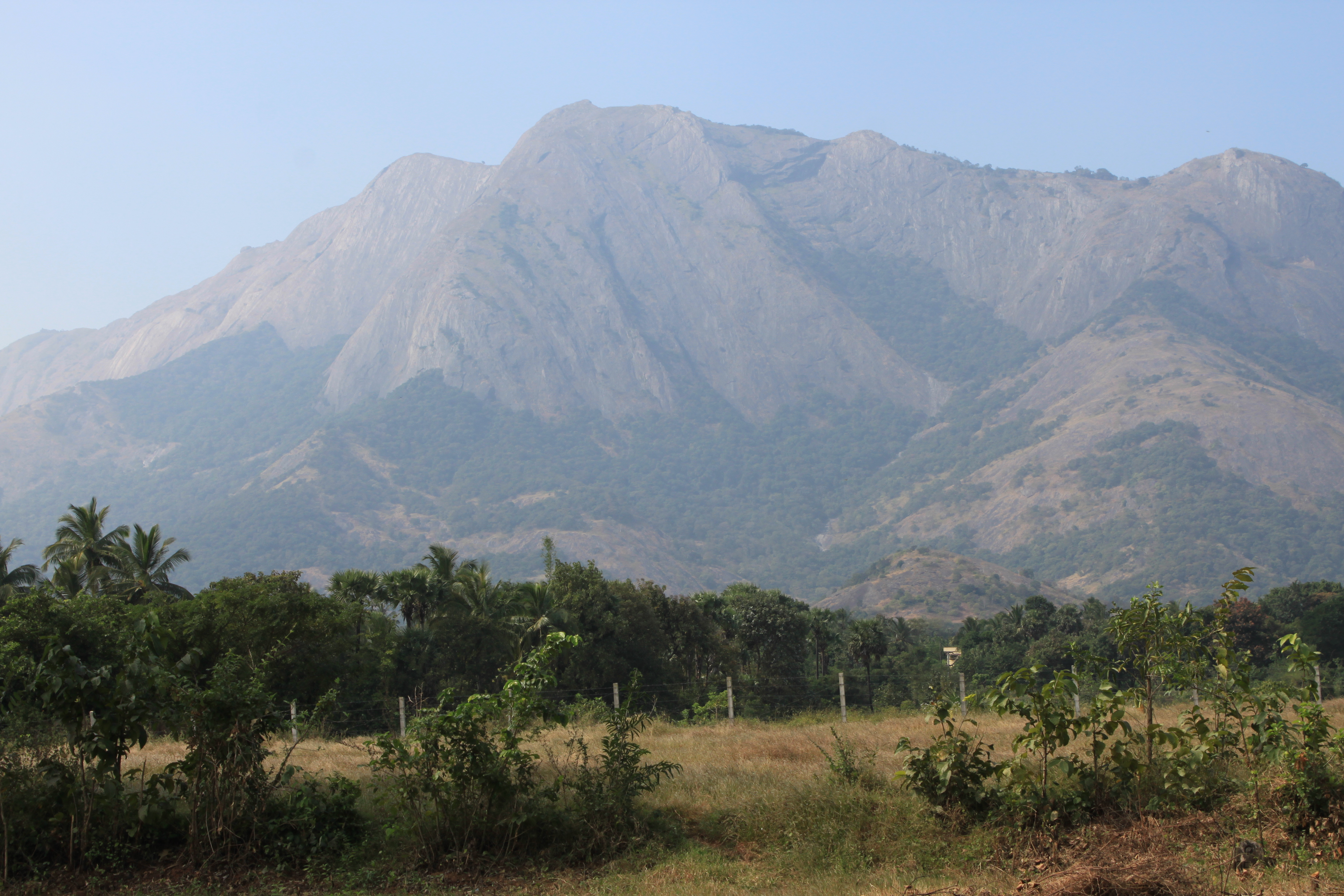
Western Ghats along the Coimbatore-Palakkad National Highway

Coimbatore lies at 11°1′6″N 76°58′21″E in south India at 427 m (1,401 ft) above sea level on the banks of the Noyyal River, in northwestern Tamil Nadu. It covers an area of 642.12 km^{2} (247.92 sq mi). It is surrounded by the Western Ghats mountain range to the west and the north, with reserve forests of the Nilgiri Biosphere Reserve on the northern side. The Noyyal River forms the southern boundary of the city, which has an extensive tank system fed by the river and rainwater. The eight major tanks and wetland areas of Coimbatore are namely, Singanallur, Valankulam, Ukkadam Periyakulam, Selvampathy, Narasampathi, Krishnampathi, Selvachinthamani, and Kumaraswami. Multiple streams drain the waste water from the city.

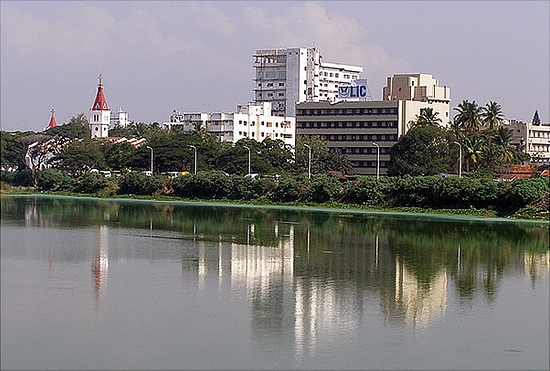
Ukkadam Periyakulam, one of the major lakes

The city is divided into two distinctive geographic regions: the dry eastern side which includes majority of the urban area of the city and the western region which borders the Nilgiris, Anaimalai and Munnar ranges. Palghat Gap, a mountain pass which connects the neighbouring state of Kerala to Tamil Nadu, lies to the west of the city. Because of its location in the biodiversity hotspot of the Western Ghats, a UNESCO World Heritage Site, the city is rich in fauna and flora. The Coimbatore urban wetlands harbours around 116 species of birds, of which 66 are resident, 17 are migratory and 33 are local migrants. The spot-billed pelican, painted stork, openbill stork, ibis, Indian spot-billed duck, teal and black-winged stilt visit the Coimbatore wetlands on their migration. Apart from the species common to the plains, various threatened and endangered species such as Indian elephants, wild boars, leopards, Bengal tigers, gaurs, Nilgiri tahr, sloth bear and black-headed oriole are found in the region.

The northern part of the city has a rich tropical evergreen forest with commercially significant trees such as teak, sandalwood, rosewood and bamboo. The soil is predominantly black, which is suitable for cotton cultivation, but some red loamy soil is also found. According to the Bureau of Indian Standards, Coimbatore falls under the Class III/IV Seismic Zone, having experienced an earthquake of magnitude 6.0 on the Richter scale on 8 February 1900.

=== Climate ===
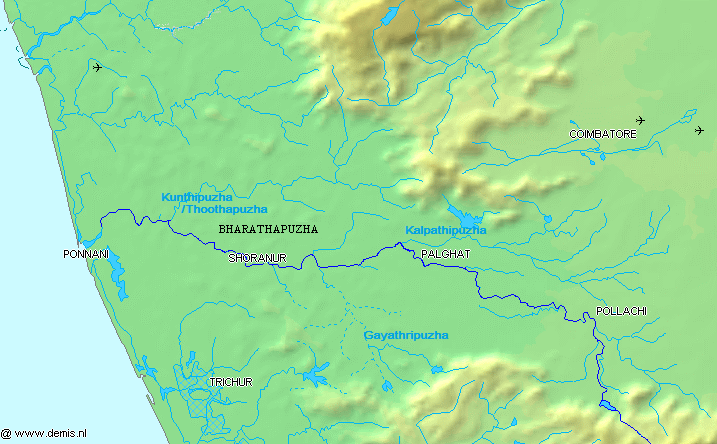
Coimbatore gets majority of rains from monsoon winds passing through the Palghat gap (topography pictured)

Under the Köppen climate classification, the city has a hot semi-arid climate (BSh), with a wet season lasting from September to November due to the northeast monsoon. The mean maximum temperature ranges from 35.9 °C (96.6 °F) to 29.2 °C (84.6 °F) and the mean minimum temperature ranges from 24.5 °C (76.1 °F) to 19.8 °C (67.6 °F). The highest temperature ever recorded is 42.6 °C (108.7 °F) on 22 April 1976 while the lowest is 12.2 °C (54.0 °F) on 12 January 1957.

Coimbatore has a tropical wet and dry climate. It experiences hot and humid summers from March to June with temperatures ranging from 25 °C to 38 °C. The monsoon season starts from July and lasts till October. The city receives moderate rainfall from the south-west monsoon and occasional heavy rainfall from the north-east monsoon. The winter season starts from November and ends in February. The temperatures during this season range from 20 °C to 30 °C.

Due to the south-west monsoon winds passing through the Palghat gap, elevated regions of the city receive rainfall in the months from June to August. After a warm and foggy September, the north-east monsoon starts from October, lasting until early November. The average annual rainfall is around 600 mm (23.6 in) with the northeast and the southwest monsoons contributing to 47% and 28% respectively to the total rainfall. This periodic rainfall does not satisfy the city's water requirements throughout the year and water supply schemes drawn from Siruvani and Pilloor help supplant the requirements during low rainfall months.

Climate data for Coimbatore (Coimbatore International Airport) 1991–2020, extremes 1948–2020)
Month	Jan	Feb	Mar	Apr	May	Jun	Jul	Aug	Sep	Oct	Nov	Dec	Year
Record high °C (°F)	35.9 (96.6)	38.8 (101.8)	40.8 (105.4)	42.6 (108.7)	41.2 (106.2)	38.0 (100.4)	38.1 (100.6)	36.0 (96.8)	37.8 (100.0)	36.8 (98.2)	35.6 (96.1)	34.4 (93.9)	42.6 (108.7)
Mean daily maximum °C (°F)	30.9 (87.6)	33.2 (91.8)	35.6 (96.1)	36.4 (97.5)	35.0 (95.0)	32.4 (90.3)	31.5 (88.7)	31.8 (89.2)	32.5 (90.5)	31.7 (89.1)	30.2 (86.4)	29.5 (85.1)	32.5 (90.5)
Mean daily minimum °C (°F)	19.2 (66.6)	20.3 (68.5)	22.3 (72.1)	24.1 (75.4)	24.0 (75.2)	23.0 (73.4)	22.4 (72.3)	22.4 (72.3)	22.5 (72.5)	22.3 (72.1)	21.5 (70.7)	19.7 (67.5)	22.0 (71.6)
Record low °C (°F)	12.2 (54.0)	12.8 (55.0)	15.8 (60.4)	18.2 (64.8)	15.6 (60.1)	18.3 (64.9)	16.1 (61.0)	16.1 (61.0)	16.7 (62.1)	14.3 (57.7)	14.1 (57.4)	12.4 (54.3)	12.2 (54.0)
Average rainfall mm (inches)	4.1 (0.16)	10.3 (0.41)	15.6 (0.61)	43.3 (1.70)	57.4 (2.26)	24.6 (0.97)	27.6 (1.09)	44.3 (1.74)	62.4 (2.46)	156.1 (6.15)	139.7 (5.50)	33.1 (1.30)	618.5 (24.35)
Average rainy days	0.2	0.4	1.0	2.9	3.3	2.6	2.9	3.0	3.7	8.0	7.2	2.1	37.5
Average relative humidity (%) (at 17:30 IST)	39	32	30	42	56	64	67	67	64	65	62	53	54
Source: India Meteorological Department

== Demographics ==
Historical population
Year	Pop.	±%
1871	35,310	—
1881	38,967	+10.4%
1891	46,383	+19.0%
1901	53,080	+14.4%
1911	47,000	−11.5%
1921	68,000	+44.7%
1931	95,000	+39.7%
1941	130,348	+37.2%
1951	198,000	+51.9%
1961	286,000	+44.4%
1971	356,000	+24.5%
1981	704,000	+97.8%
1991	816,321	+16.0%
2001	930,882	+14.0%
2011	1,601,438	+72.0%
Sources: 1871–1901: 1911–2001: 1981: Increase in population due to merger of Singanallur Municipality; 2001: 2011: 2011: Increase in population due to expansion of the city

Coimbatore has a population of 1,601,438. As per the 2011 census based on pre-expansion city limits, Coimbatore had a population of 1,050,721 with a sex ratio of 997 females for every 1,000 males, much above the national average of 929. It is the second largest city in the state after capital Chennai and the sixteenth largest urban agglomeration in India. A total of 102,069 were under the age of six, comprising 52,275 males and 49,794 females. The average literacy of the city was 82.43%, compared to the national average of 72.99%. There were a total of 425,115 workers, comprising 1,539 cultivators, 2,908 main agricultural labourer, 11,789 in house hold industries, 385,802 other workers, 23,077 marginal workers, 531 marginal cultivators, 500 marginal agricultural labourer, 1,169 marginal workers in household industries and 20,877 other marginal workers.

As per the 2001 census, Coimbatore had a population of 930,882 within the municipal corporation limits. The population of the urban agglomeration as per 2011 census is 2,136,916 with males constituting 50.08% of the population and females 49.92%. Coimbatore has an average literacy rate of 89.23%, higher than the national average of 74.04%. Male literacy is 93.17% and female literacy is 85.3% with 8.9% of the population under six years of age. The sex ratio was 964 females per 1000 males. In 2005, the crime rate in the city was 265.9 per 100,000 people, accounting for 1.2% of all crimes reported in major cities in India. It ranked 21st among 35 major cities in India in the incidence of crimes. In 2011, the population density in the city was 10,052 per km^{2} (26,035 per mi^{2}). Around 8% of the city's population lives in slums.

== Administration and politics ==
Administrative officials
Title	Name
Mayor	R. Ranganayaki
Municipal Commissioner	Sivaguru Prabakaran
Police Commissioner	A. Saravana Sundar

Coimbatore is a municipal corporation administered by the Coimbatore Municipal Corporation. It was accorded municipality status in 1866, and Coimbatore was elevated as a municipal corporation in 1981. The city is divided into five administrative zones – East, West, North, South and Central, each further subdivided into 20 wards. Each ward is represented by a councillor who is elected by direct election and the Mayor of Coimbatore is elected by Councillors. The executive wing of the corporation is headed by a Corporation Commissioner and maintains basic services like water supply, sewage and roads. According to the Ministry of Housing and Urban Affairs, the municipal corporation reported revenue receipts of ₹9.89 billion (US$110 million) and expenditure of ₹11.05 billion (US$120 million) in 2022–23. Tax revenue accounted for about 46.3% of the total revenue.

Coimbatore is the administrative headquarters of the Coimbatore district. It was established as the capital of the district in 1804. The district itself is administered by the district collector and the district court in Coimbatore is the highest court of appeal in the district. The Coimbatore City Police is headed by a Commissioner of Police and there are 18 police stations in the city. Coimbatore was ranked amongst the top three safest cities in India according to National Crime Records Bureau report in 2023.

A large part of the Coimbatore urban agglomeration falls outside the municipal corporation limits. These suburbs are governed by local bodies called Gram Panchayats and Town Panchayats. Besides the Coimbatore Municipal Corporation, the Coimbatore urban agglomeration comprises the Town Panchayats of Vellalur, Irugur, Pallapalayam, Kannampalayam, Veerapandi, Periyanaickenpalayam, Narasimhanaickenpalayam, Idikarai, Vedapatti, Perur, Madukkarai, Ettimadai, Thondamuthur, Uliyampalayam, Thirumalayampalayam, Othakalmandapam, Alanthurai, Pooluvapatti, Thenkarai, Karumathampatti, Sarcarsamakulam, Mopperipalayam and Gudalur, census towns of Ashokapuram, Kurudampalayam, Malumichampatti, Selvapuram, Chettipalayam, Sulur, Chinniampalayam, Somayampalayam, Muthugoundan Pudur, Arasur, Kaniyur, Neelambur and municipalities of Kuniyamuthur, Kurichi and Goundampalayam. These local bodies are in turn split into wards each electing a councillor through direct election. The head of these local bodies are elected by the respective councillors from amongst them.

Coimbatore has traditionally been a stronghold of the Dravidian parties with national parties such as the Bharatiya Janata Party (BJP) as well as the Communist Party of India (Marxist) (CPI(M)) also having a significant presence. The city elects ten members to the Tamil Nadu Legislative Assembly and one member to the Indian Parliament. The six legislative assembly constituencies in the city are Coimbatore North, Coimbatore South, Kaundampalayam, Singanallur, Thondamuthur and Kinathukadavu which form a part of the Coimbatore Parliamentary Constituency. Part of the urban agglomeration comes under the Nilgiris and Pollachi constituencies. In the Indian general election held in 2019, CPI (M) candidate P.R. Natarajan defeated C. P. Radhakrishnan of the BJP in the Lok Sabha constituency. In the last legislative assembly election held in 2021, the AIADMK led front won in all the assembly constituencies in the city.

== Economy ==
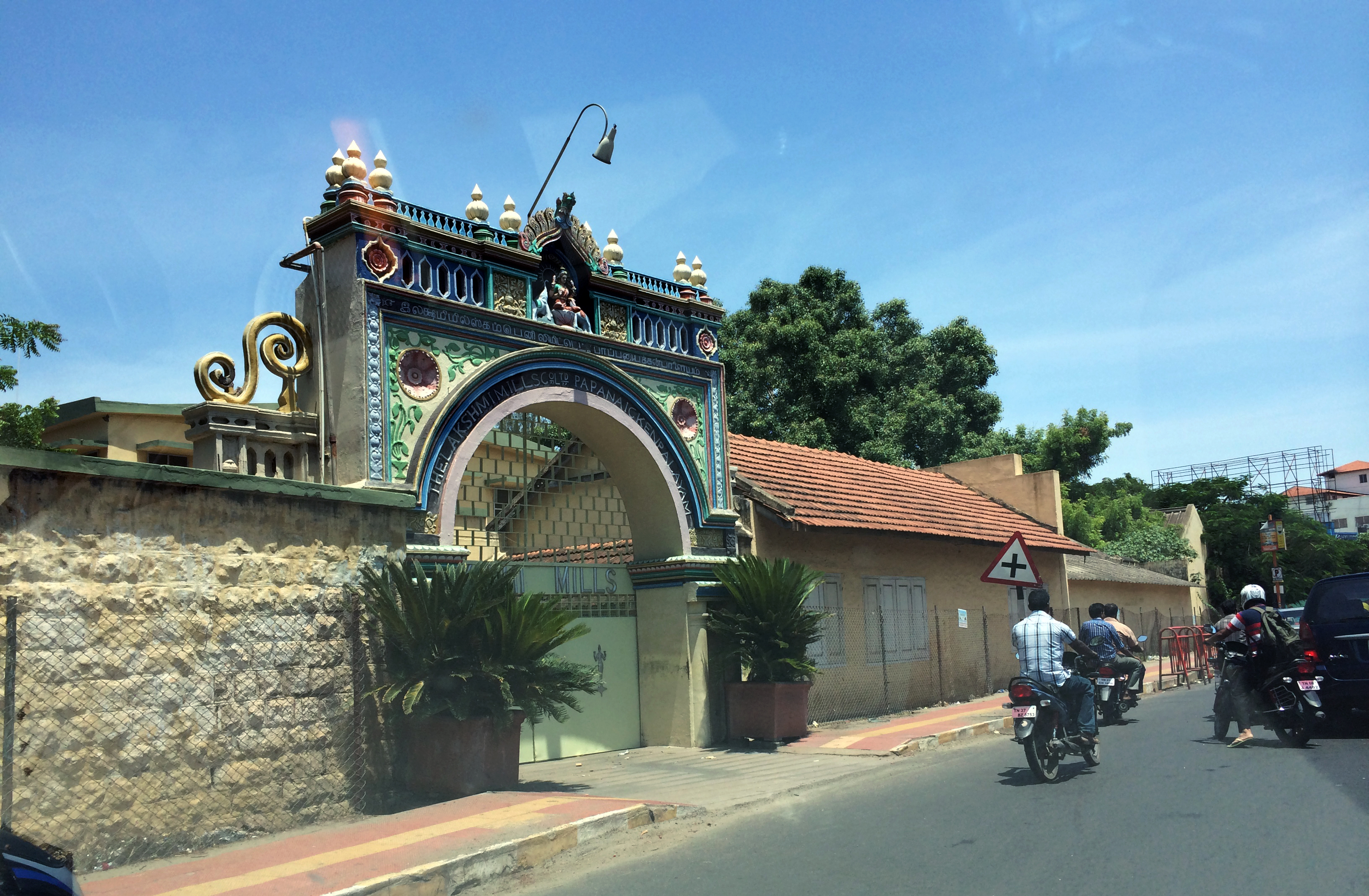
Lakshmi Mills was one of the earliest textile mills in Coimbatore

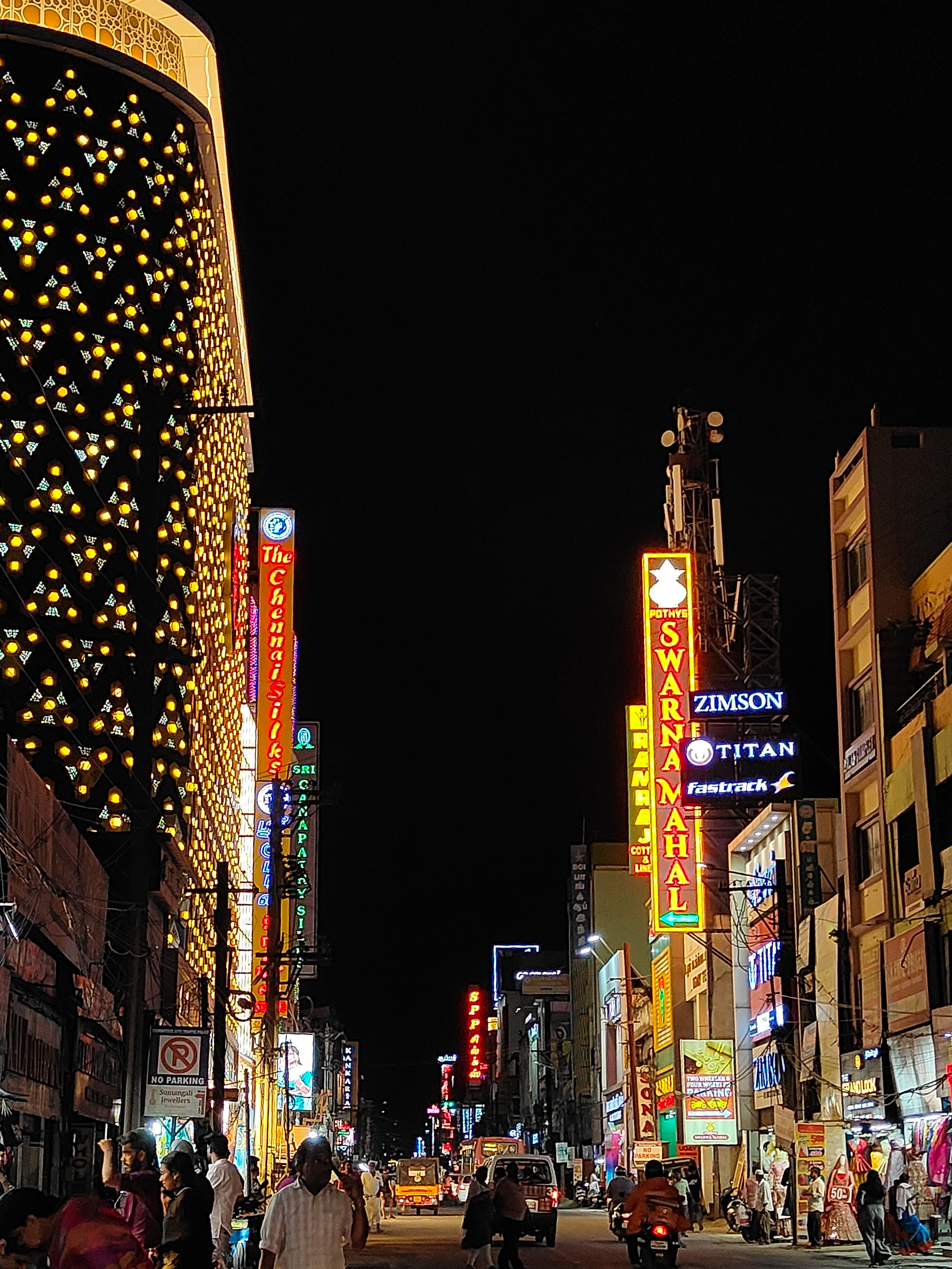
Oppanakara Street

A major hub for manufacturing, education and healthcare in Tamil Nadu, Coimbatore is among the fastest growing tier-II cities in India. As of 2020, the GDP was estimated to be US$13.06 (equivalent to $16.25 in 2025) billion. It houses more than 25,000 small, medium and large industries with the primary industries being engineering and textiles. Coimbatore is called the "Manchester of South India" due to its extensive textile industry, fed by the surrounding cotton fields. TIDEL Park Coimbatore in ELCOT SEZ was the first special economic zone (SEZ) set up in 2006. In 2010, Coimbatore ranked 15th in the list of most competitive (by business environment) Indian cities. Coimbatore also has a 160,000 square feet (15,000 m^{2}) trade fair ground, built in 1999 and is owned by CODISSIA.

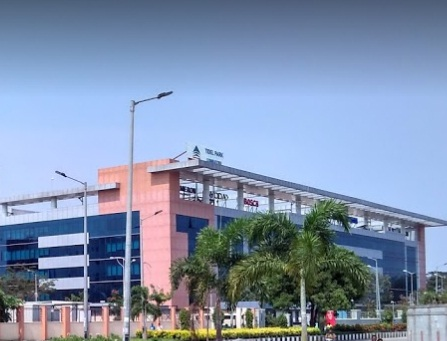
Coimbatore is one of the largest exporters of software. Pictured is TIDEL Park, an IT SEZ.

Coimbatore region experienced a textile boom in the 1920s and 1930s. Though, Robert Stanes had established Coimbatore's first textile mills as early as the late 19th century, it was during this period that Coimbatore emerged as a prominent industrial centre. In 2009 Coimbatore was home to around 15% of the cotton spinning capacity in India. Coimbatore has trade associations such as CODISSIA, COINDIA and COJEWEL representing the industries in the city. Coimbatore houses a number of textile mills and is the base of textile research institutes like the Sardar Vallabhbhai Patel International School of Textiles & Management, Central Institute for Cotton Research (CICR) and the South India Textile Research Institute (SITRA). Kovai Cora Cotton saree is a recognised Geographical Indication. The Southern India Mills' Association (SIMA) founded in 1933 caters to the interests of the various textile mills and their employees.

Coimbatore is the second largest producer of software in the state after Chennai. TIDEL Park Coimbatore and other Information technology parks in the city has aided in the growth of IT and Business process outsourcing industries in the city. It is ranked at 17th among the top global outsourcing cities by Tholons. Software exports stood at ₹7.1 billion (US$76 million) for the financial year 2009–10 up 90% from the previous year. Coimbatore has a large and diversified manufacturing sector and a number of engineering colleges producing about 50,000 engineers annually.

Coimbatore is a major center for the manufacture of automotive components in India with car manufacturers Maruti Udyog and Tata Motors sourcing up to 30%, of their automotive components from the city. G.D. Naidu developed India's first indigenous motor in 1937. India's first indigenously developed diesel engine for cars was manufactured in the city in 1972. The city is also a major centre for small auto component makers catering to the automobile industry, from personal to commercial and farm vehicles. The city contributes to about 75% of the 100,000 total monthly output of wet grinders in India. The industry employs 70,000 people and had a yearly turnover of ₹28 billion (US$300 million) in 2015. The term "Coimbatore Wet Grinder" has been given a Geographical indication.

Coimbatore is also referred to as "the Pump City" as it supplies nearly 50% of India's requirements of motors and pumps. The city is one of the largest exporters of jewellery renowned for diamond cutting, cast and machine made jewellery. There are about 3,000 jewellery manufacturers employing over 40,000 goldsmiths. Coimbatore has a large number of poultry farms and is a major producer of chicken eggs. The city contributes to nearly 95% of processed chicken meat exports. Coimbatore has some of the country's oldest flour mills and these mills which cater to all the southern states, have a combined grinding capacity of more than 50,000 MT per month. The hospitality industry has seen a growth in the 21st century with new upscale hotels being set up.

== Culture ==
Coimbatore and its people have a reputation for entrepreneurship. Though it is generally considered a traditional city, Coimbatore is diverse and cosmopolitan. The World Classical Tamil Conference 2010 was held in Coimbatore. The heavy industrialisation of the city has also resulted in the growth of trade unions. The city is regularly features among the top 10 best cities to live in India. 24 November, the date of establishment of Coimbatore as a district is celebrated as "Coimbatore Day".

=== Language ===
Languages of Coimbatore (2011)
Language	Percent
Tamil	67.60%
Telugu	16.48%
Malayalam	7.28%
Others	8.64%

Tamil is the official language and Kongu Tamil (also called Kangee or Kongalam), a dialect, is predominantly spoken. As per the 2011 census, Tamil is the most spoken language with 710,326 speakers, followed by Telugu (173,136), Malayalam (76,485) and Kannada (43,629). Other languages spoken in the city include Urdu (15,484) and Hindi (13,608). During the 1970s the city witnessed a population explosion as a result of migration fuelled by increased economic growth and job opportunities.

=== Ethnicity and religion ===
The population of Coimbatore consists of majority of Tamils with a significant number of Telugus, Kannadigas, Malayalis, and North Indians, mainly Gujaratis.

Religions in Coimbatore (2011)
Religion	Percent
Hinduism	83.31%
Islam	8.63%
Christianity	7.53%
Other or not stated	0.53%

The city's population is predominantly Hindu with minority Muslim and Christian population. Jains, Sikhs and Buddhists are also present in small numbers. According to the religious census of 2011, Coimbatore has 83.31% Hindus, 8.63% Muslims, 7.53% Christians, 0.28% Jains, 0.05% Sikhs, 0.02% Buddhists and 0.01% Others. 0.17% of the respondents did not state their religion.

The Mariamman festivals at the city's numerous Mariamman temples are major events in summer. Major Hindu temples in the city include the Perur Patteeswarar Temple, Naga Sai Mandir, Koniamman Temple, Thandu Mariamman Temple, Eachanari Vinayagar Temple, Puliakulam Temple, Marudamalai Murugan Temple, Loga Nayaga Shaniswara Temple, Ashtamsa Varadha Anjaneyar Temple, Masani Amman Temple, Karamadai Ranganathar Temple, Dhyanalinga Yogic Temple and Adiyogi Shiva. The mosques on Oppanakara Street and Big Bazaar Street date back to the 18th century CE. Christian missions date back to the 17th century when permission was granted by the Nayak rulers to set up churches in the region. Sikh Gurudwaras and Jain temples are also present in Coimbatore.

=== Cuisine ===
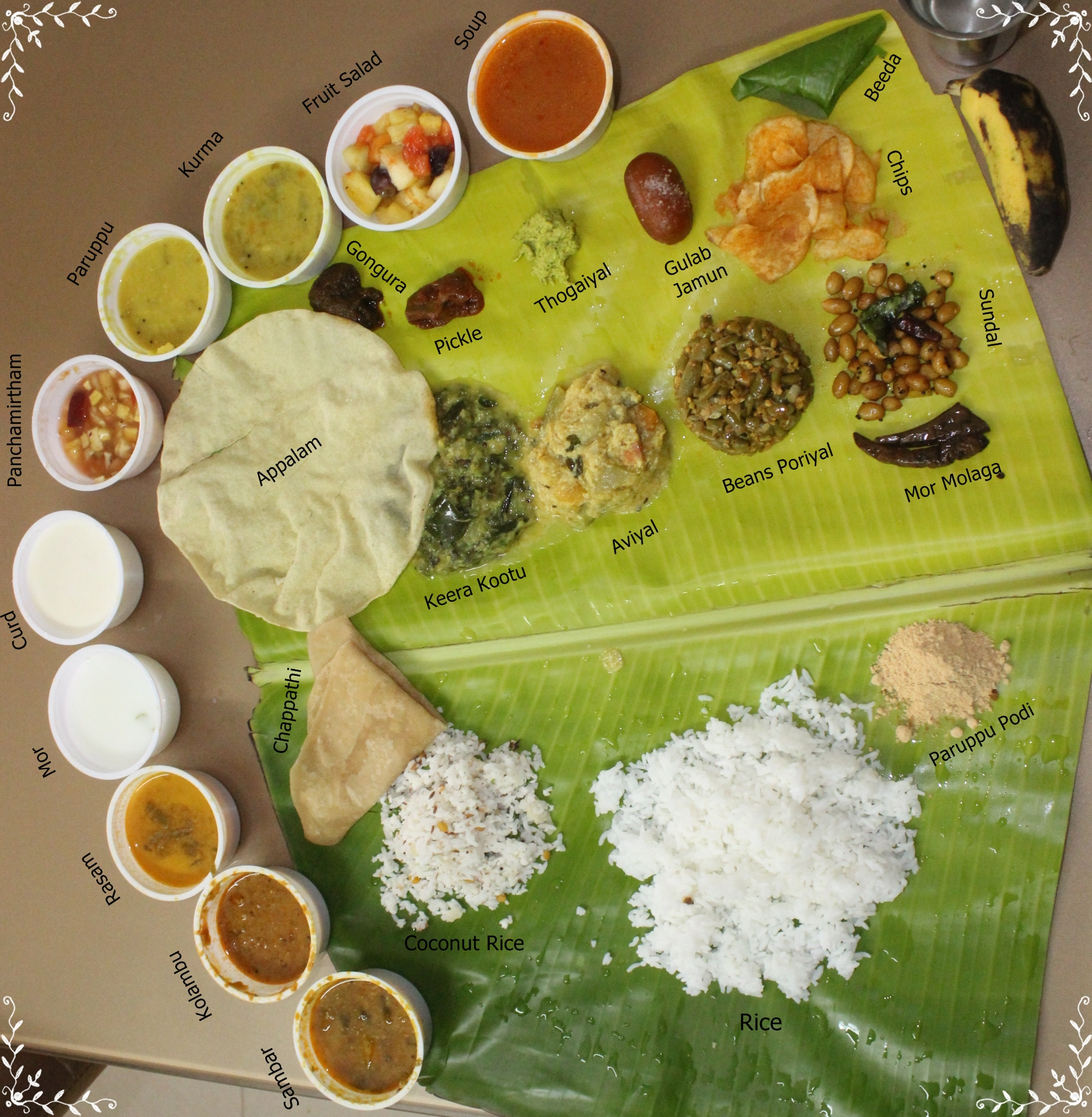
A typical vegetarian meal

Coimbatore cuisine is predominantly south Indian with rice as its base. Most local restaurants still retain their rural flavor, with many restaurants serving food over a banana leaf. Eating on a banana leaf is an old custom and imparts a unique flavor to the food and is considered healthy. North Indian, Chinese and continental cuisines are also available. Idly, dosa, paniyaram and appam are popular dishes.

Coimbatore has an active street food culture and various cuisine options for dining. Arisi paruppu sadam and sambar sadam, made from a mixture of dal and rice, is a recipe that existed from the 4th century CE that is unique to the area. Ariseemparuppu or arisi paruppu satham (literally translated as Rice and dal) originated from Coimbatore and the people of the city celebrate January 8 as national Aruseemparuppu day, after given light by a popular influencer and food consultant. Kaalaan (transl. Mushroom) is a popular dish prepared by simmering deep-fried mushrooms (usually chopped) in a spicy broth until it reaches a porridge-like consistency; the dish is served sprinkled with chopped onions and coriander leaves. Chaats made from potatoes and a mix of other vegetables and spices are also popular.

=== Arts ===
Swamikannu Vincent, who had built the first cinema of south India in Coimbatore, introduced the concept of Tent Cinema in which a tent was erected on an open land to screen the films. Central Studios was set up in 1935 while S. M. Sriramulu Naidu established Pakshiraja Studios in 1945. The city conducts its own music festival every year. Art, dance and music concerts are held annually during the months of September and December (Tamil calendar month of Margazhi). Coimbatore also houses a number of museums and art galleries like Gass Forest Museum, GD Museums (including the Gedee Car Museum), Government Museum, Kadhi Gandhi Gallery, Kasthuri Srinivasan Art Gallery and Textile Museum, and Mahatma Gandhi Memorial.

== Transport ==
=== Air ===
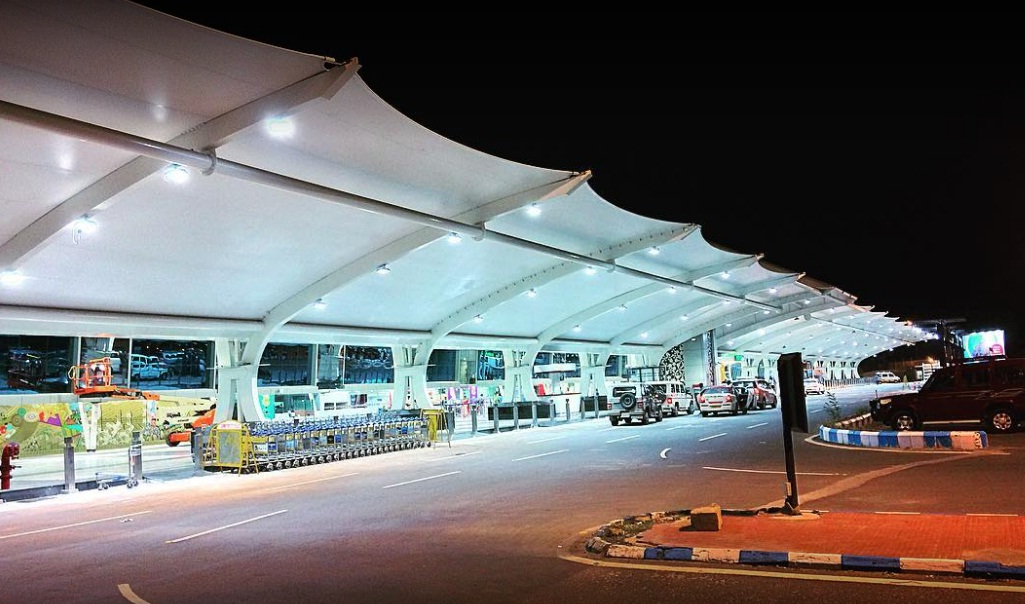
Coimbatore International Airport

The city is served by the Coimbatore International Airport at Peelamedu 10 km (6.2 mi) from the city center. The airport was established in 1940 with Air India operating scheduled services in 1948. Coimbatore flying club and aviation training academy was established in 1960. In 1987, the airport underwent modernization and further expansion of the existing runway to enable handling of larger jet aircraft. On 6 June 2012, Prime Minister of India declared the government's intention to upgrade the airport to international status and the Union Cabinet granted it the status of international airport on 2 October 2012. The airport is operated by Airports Authority of India and caters to domestic flights to major Indian cities and international flights to Sharjah, and Singapore. As of 2023-24, the airport was the second largest airport in Tamil Nadu in terms of passengers handled. It has a single runway, which is 2,990 m (9,810 ft) in length and is capable of handling medium sized aircraft.

Sulur Air Force Station, located at Sulur is an air base operated by the Indian Air Force and accommodates Antonov An-32 transport aircraft, Mil Mi-17 transport helicopters, and the HAL Dhruv helicopters of the Sarang helicopter display team. The first squadron of indigenous built HAL Tejas fighter aircraft was inducted in 2020.

=== Rail ===
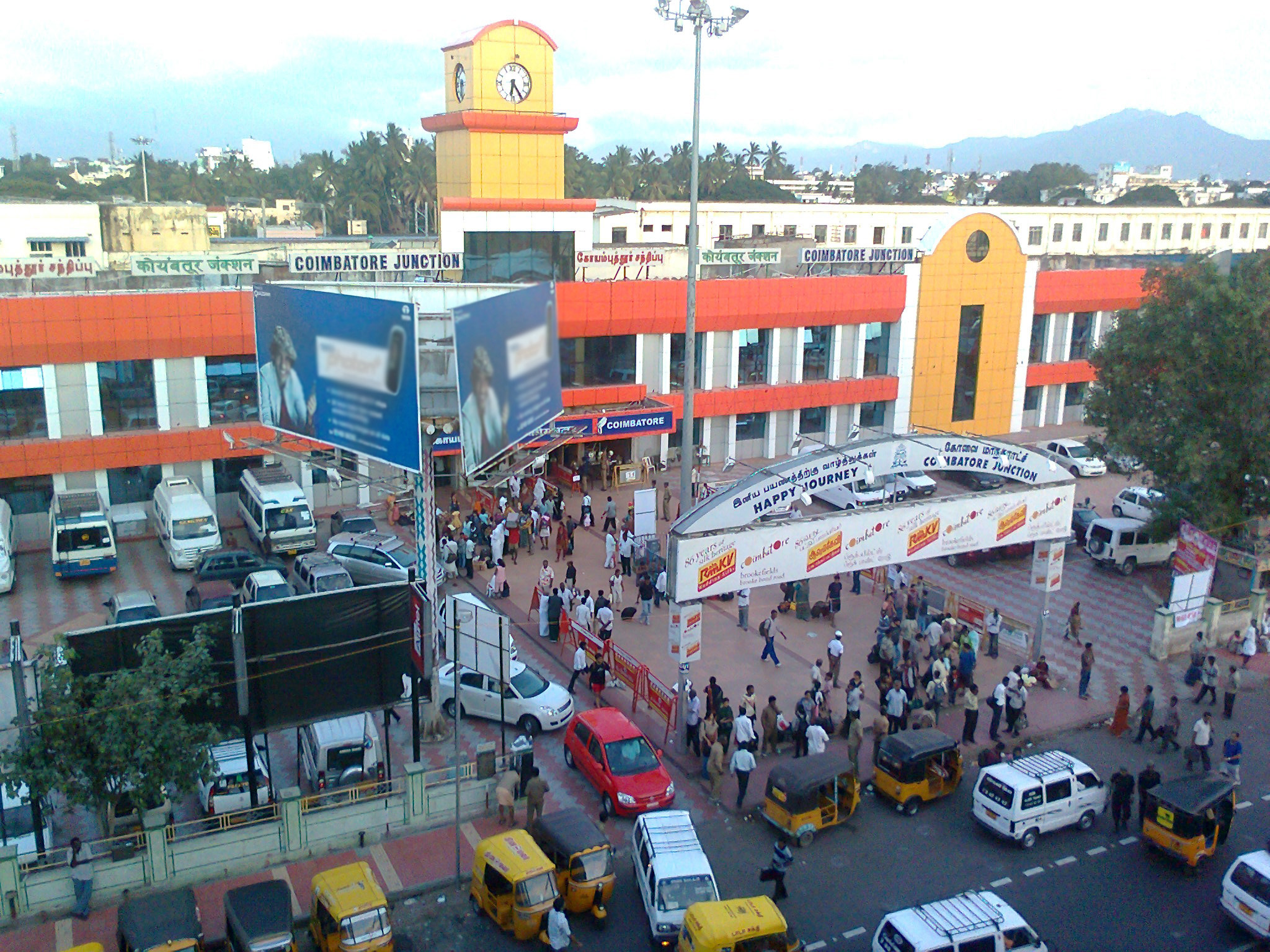
Coimbatore Junction, busiest railway station in the city

Train service in Coimbatore started in 1861, upon the construction of the Podanur – Madras line connecting Kerala and the west coast with the rest of India. Coimbatore lies on the Jolarpettai–Shoranur line 5 ft 6 in (1,676 mm) broad gauge railway line and the city falls under the Salem division of the Southern Railway zone of Indian Railways. The major railway station is the Coimbatore Junction which is the second-largest income generating station in the Southern Railway zone after Chennai Central and is amongst the top hundred booking stations of Indian Railways. Other major railway stations catering to the city include Coimbatore North Junction, Podanur Junction and minor stations at Peelamedu, Singanallur, Irugur Junction, Perianaikanpalayam, Madukkarai, Somanur and Sulur.

==== Metro rail ====
The Central Government proposed a metro rail system for 16 tier-2 cities in India including Coimbatore in 2010. In 2011, the Government of Tamil Nadu shelved the proposal in favour of a monorail. Coimbatore Railway Struggle Committee has also protested to implement metro rail project in Coimbatore. In 2013, E. Sreedharan made survey and announced metro rail as suitable transport for Coimbatore In 2017, the Government of Tamil Nadu proposed a metro for Coimbatore. Feasibility studies were completed in 2021 and five corridors were proposed.

=== Road ===
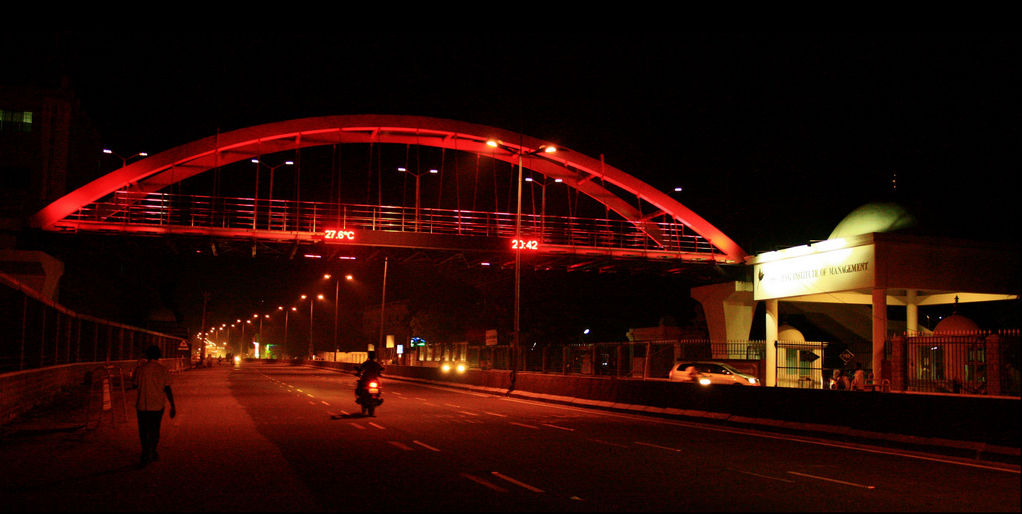
Avinashi Road, one of the major arterial roads

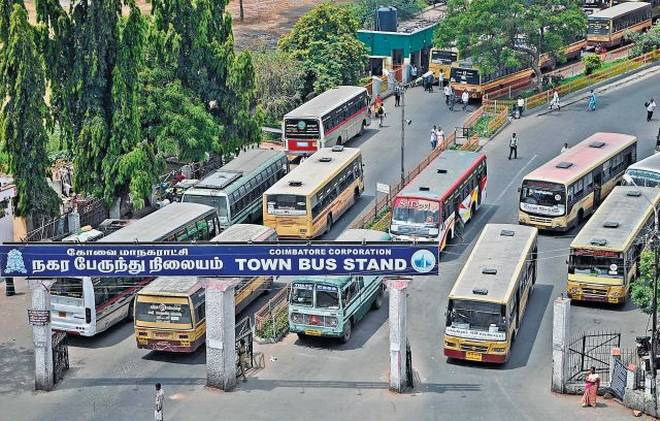
Gandhipuram bus stand

There are six major arterial roads in the city: Avinashi Road, Trichy Road, Sathy Road, Mettupalayam Road, Palakkad Road and Pollachi Road. The Coimbatore bypass is a series of bypasses connecting the various National Highways and State Highways passing through and originating from Coimbatore. The first section of the bypass, a 28-kilometre (17 mi) stretch from Neelambur to Madukkarai on National Highway 544 opened for traffic in 2000. It was the first road privatisation project to be implemented on a build–operate–transfer model in South India. In 2008, the State Highways department came up with a proposal to create a Ring road to help de-congest the main arterial roads and the 12 km road would extend from Peelamedu to Mettupalayam road. In 2011, the Chief Minister of Tamil Nadu announced the construction of two new flyovers at Ukkadam and Athupalam to help de-congest the Palakkad Road. In 2012, the Government of Tamil Nadu decided in favour of an eastern road that connected Mettupalayam Road with Avinashi Road and the existing bypass. G. D. Naidu Elevated Expressway is a 10.01 km (6.22 mi) four-lane flyover that connects the Uppilipalayam flyover and Goldwins junction in Peelamedu. It traverses along the Avinashi road, and is the second longest expressway in India. There are five National Highways passing through the city:

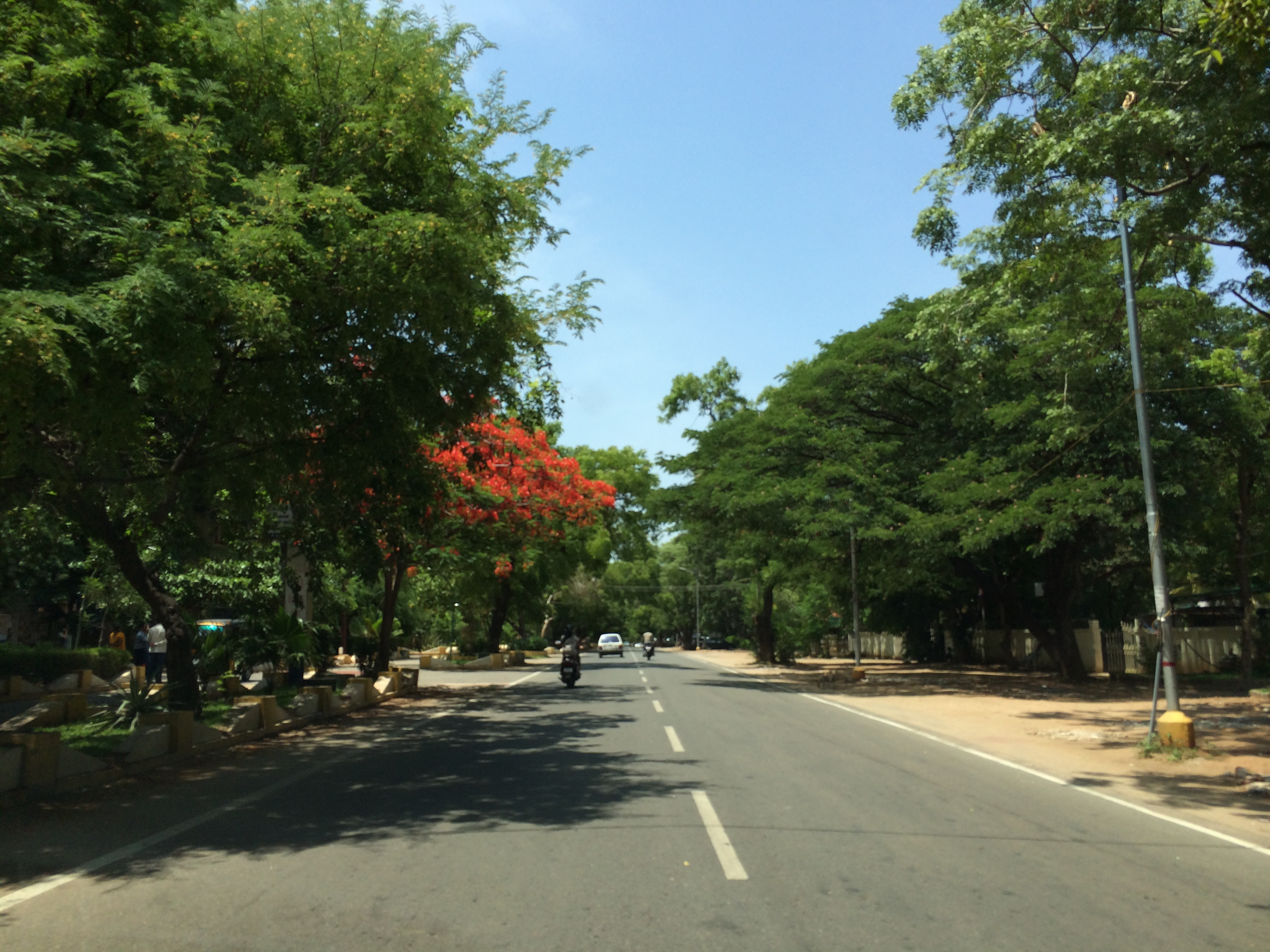
Race Course Road

Highway Number	Destination	Via
544	Salem	Perundurai, Chithode
544	Kochi	Palakkad, Thrissur
948	Bangalore	Kollegal, Chamrajnagar
81	Chidambaram	Karur, Tiruchirappalli
181	Gundlupet	Mettupalayam, Ooty
83	Nagapattinam	Pollachi, Udumalaipettai, Palani, Oddanchatram, Dindigul, Tiruchirappalli, Thanjavur

Apart from State and National Highways, the city corporation maintains a 635.32 kilometres (394.77 miles) long road network. The city is also served by auto rickshaws and taxi services. Coimbatore has four Regional Transport Offices viz. TN 37 (South), TN 38 (North), TN 66 (Central), TN 99 (West).

==== Bus ====
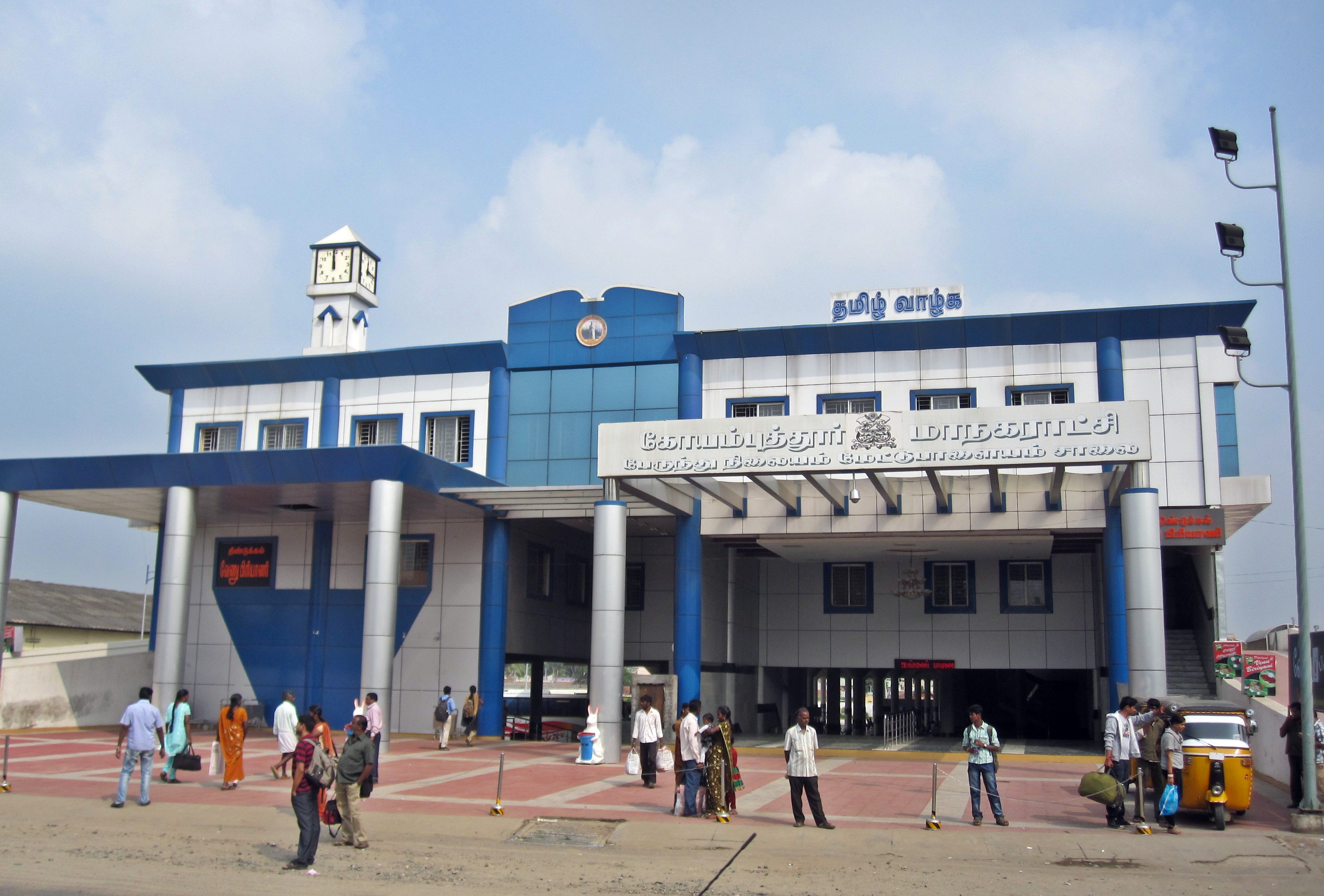
Bus stand at Mettupalayam road

Town buses started operating in 1921 and serve most parts of the city, as well as other towns and villages in the district. The number of inter-city routes operated by Coimbatore division is 119 with a fleet of more than 500 buses. It also operates town buses on 257 intra-city routes. The intra-city buses operate from major bus stations in Gandhipuram Central Bus Terminus, Singanallur Bus Terminus, Ukkadam Bus Terminus and Saibaba Colony Bus Terminus to other parts across the city. Inter-city and intra-city buses that connect Coimbatore operate from different bus stands:

Location	Bus Station	Destinations
Gandhipuram	Central	Avinashi, Erode, Gobichettipalayam, Mettupalayam, Salem, Sathyamangalam, Tiruppur; Other locations in Coimbatore, Erode, Salem, and Tiruppur districts
Gandhipuram	SETC	Express services towards Tamil Nadu, Andhra Pradesh, Karnataka, Kerala and Puducherry
Gandhipuram	Omni Bus Stand	Private mofussil bus services towards Tamil Nadu, Andhra Pradesh, Karnataka, Kerala, Puducherry and Telangana
Gandhipuram	Town Bus Stand	Intracity services
Saibaba Colony	Saibaba Colony	Nilgiris district
Singanallur	Singanallur	Dharapuram, Tiruchirappalli, Madurai, and South Tamil Nadu
Ukkadam	Ukkadam	Palani, Pollachi, Udumalpet; Districts of Dindigul and Theni; State of Kerala

The Coimbatore Integrated Bus Terminus planned at Vellalore was cancelled midway in 2023 due to a lack of sufficient approach roads to the terminus and a hazardous waste dump nearby. Coimbatore BRTS is a proposed bus rapid transit project under the JNNURM scheme of the Government of India. It is planned along a 27.6 kilometres (17.1 mi) stretch connecting Avinashi road and Mettupalayam road.

== Education ==
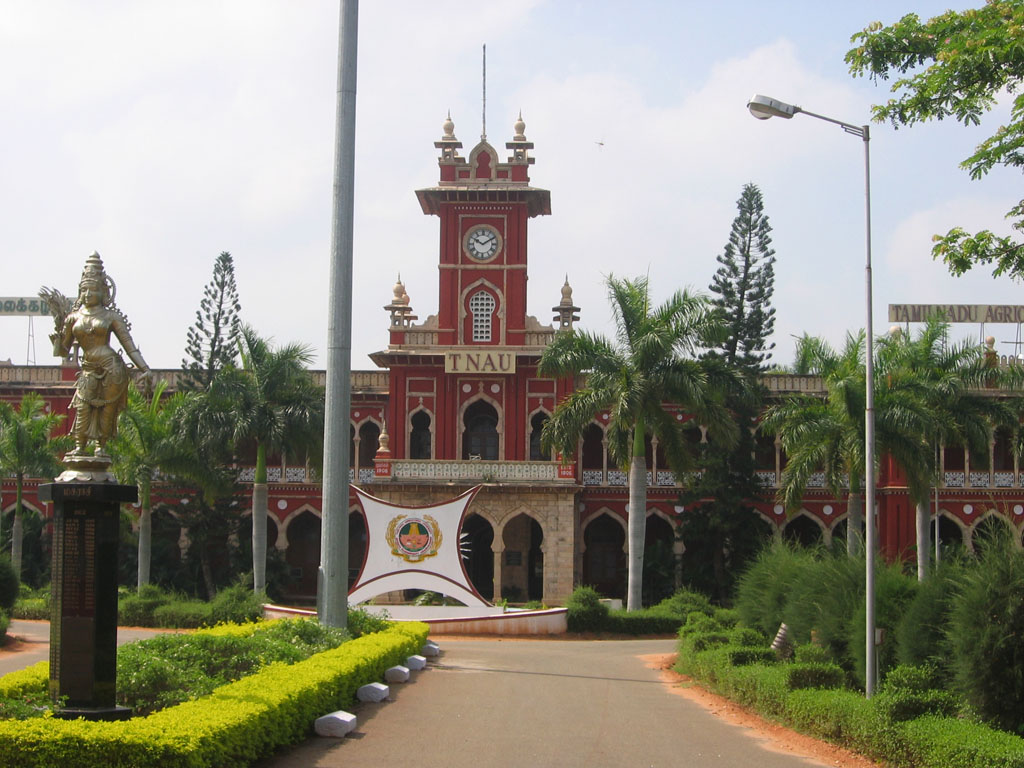
Tamil Nadu Agricultural University, one of the foremost institutions of agriculture in India

Coimbatore is a major educational hub. The first school was established in 1831. The first college Government Arts College, was opened in 1875. The first engineering college in the city, the Arthur Hope College of Technology (now known as the Government College of Technology, Coimbatore), was started by G.D. Naidu in 1945 followed later by private engineering colleges PSG College of Technology, and Coimbatore Institute of Technology in the 1950s. The Air Force Administrative College, established in 1949, is the oldest training institute of the Indian Air Force. Coimbatore Medical College was opened in 1966 and a second Government run ESIC medical college was established in 2016. Government law college is a public law college that started functioning in 1978. The agricultural school established in 1868 was converted into Tamil Nadu Agricultural University in 1971 and the Sálim Ali Centre for Ornithology and Natural History was opened in 1990.

As of 2023, the district is home to seven universities, 46 engineering colleges, 21 management schools, eight architectural schools, three medical colleges, two dental colleges, 27 polytechnics and 62 arts and science colleges. The city houses three government run universities Tamil Nadu Agricultural University, Bharathiar University, Anna University Coimbatore and four private universities.

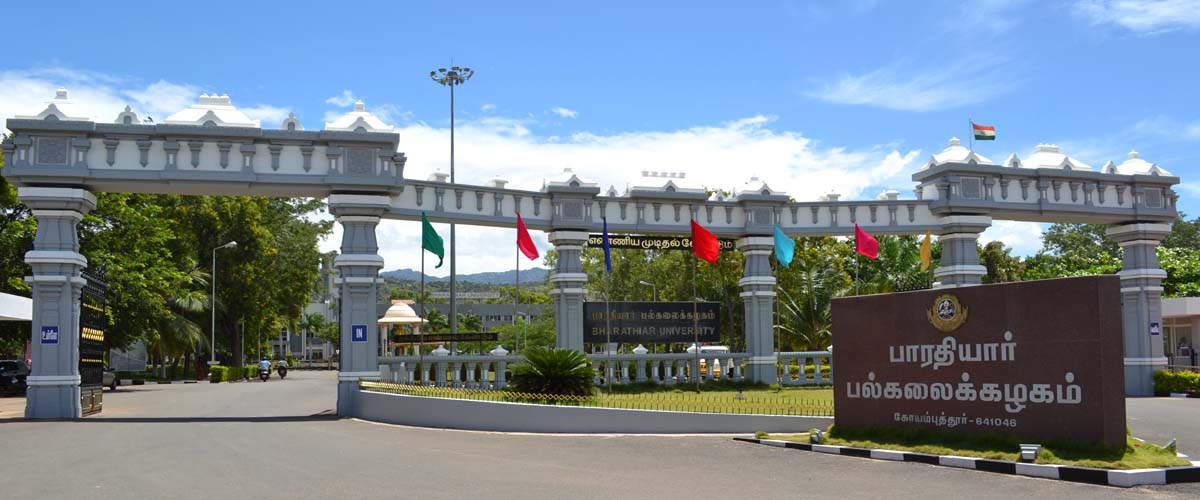
Bharathiar University established in 1982 is based out of the city

The city houses Government research institutes including the Central Institute for Cotton Research, Sugarcane Breeding Research Institute, Institute of Forest Genetics and Tree Breeding (IFGTB), Indian Council of Forestry Research and Education and Tamil Nadu Institute of Urban Studies. In 2008, Government of India announced a plan to establish a world class university in the region.

Three types of schools operate in Coimbatore: government run schools, schools funded by the government but run by private trusts (aided schools) and schools funded completely by private trusts. Schools follow Tamil Nadu State Board, Matriculation, CBSE, ICSE/ISC or Tamil Nadu Anglo-Indian school board syllabus. Samacheer Kalvi (Equitable education system) was introduced by the state government in 2010 to integrate the various school educational systems within the state. The city falls under the purview of Coimbatore education district and about 31320 students appeared for SSLC examinations in 2023.

== Utility services ==
=== Media ===
Four major English newspapers The Hindu, The Times of India, Deccan Chronicle and The New Indian Express bring out editions from the city. Business Line, a business newspaper also brings out a Coimbatore edition. Tamil newspapers which have Coimbatore editions include Dinamalar, Dina Thanthi, Dinamani, Dinakaran, Tamil Murasu and Maalai Malar (both evening newspapers). Lotus News is based out of the city.

A Medium wave radio station is operated by All India Radio, with programs in Tamil, English and Hindi. Five FM radio stations operate from Coimbatore – Rainbow FM, Suryan FM, Radio Mirchi, Radio City and Hello FM. All these private radio stations air exclusively Tamil-based programs, including film music. Television relay started in 1985 from Delhi Doordarshan and in 1986, after inception of the repeater tower at Kodaikanal, telecast from Madras commenced. In 2005, Doordarshan opened its studio in Coimbatore. Television services are accessible through DTH or digital cable.

=== Telecommunication ===
Coimbatore has a well-connected communications infrastructure. Till the 1990s the state owned Bharat Sanchar Nigam Limited (BSNL) was the only telecommunication service provider in the city. In the 1990s, private telecom companies too started offering their services. As of 2019, BSNL, Reliance Communications, Bharti Airtel, Tata Communications, Tata Teleservices, Reliance Jio and ACT offer broadband service and fixed line services. Cellular telephony was first introduced in 1997 and mobile telephone services available. Coimbatore is the headquarters of the Tamil Nadu circle of cellular service providers.

=== Healthcare ===
As of 2010, the size of the health care industry in Coimbatore is estimated at ₹1,500 crore (US$160 million). There are around 750 hospitals in the city with an in-patient capacity of 5,000 beds. These hospitals include single speciality institutions like eye care clinics (e.g. Aravind Eye Hospitals) and also multi special hospitals. The first health care centre in the city was started in 1909. Coimbatore Medical College Hospital and ESI Hospital are government run tertiary care hospitals and provide free health care. The city corporation maintains 16 dispensaries and two maternity homes. People from nearby districts and the state of Kerala visit Coimbatore for medical tourism due to the availability of hospitals and healthcare facilities.

== Sports and recreation ==
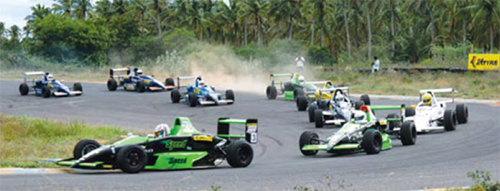
A typical raceday scene at Kari Motor Speedway

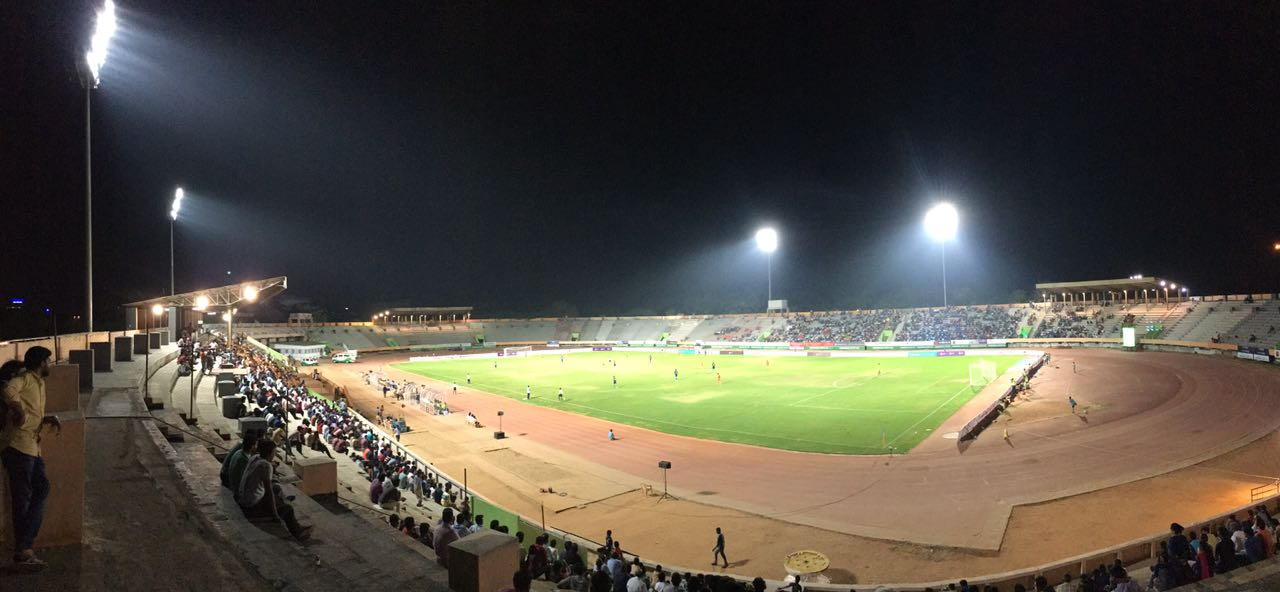
Nehru Stadium

Coimbatore is often referred to as "India's Motorsports Hub" and the "Backyard of Indian Motorsports". S.Karivardhan designed and built entry – level race cars and the Kari Motor Speedway, a Formula 3 Category circuit, is named after him. Tyre manufacturer MRF assembles Formula Ford cars in Coimbatore in association with former F3 Champion J. Anand and racing company Super Speeds designs Formula cars. Rallying is another major event with rallies conducted in closed roads around Coimbatore. Narain Karthikeyan, India's first Formula One driver hails from the city, and other motorsport drivers from Coimbatore include J. Anand and V. R. Naren Kumar.

Nehru Stadium, built originally for football, also hosts athletic meets. The stadium has been renovated with Korean grass for the field and a synthetic track around it for athletics. Apart from the stadium, other sporting venues include the Coimbatore Golf Course, an 18 – hole golf course and Coimbatore Cosmopolitan Club, which is more than 100 years old. Coimbatore Flying Club is located in the Coimbatore Airport premises. The city hosts its own annual marathon called Coimbatore Marathon as an event to raise cancer awareness. Retired tennis player Nirupama Vaidyanathan, who became the first Indian woman in the modern era to feature and win a round at a main draw Grand Slam in 1998 Australian Open hails from Coimbatore. Coimbatore District Chess Association (CDCA), established in 1940, is the oldest chess association in the country.

=== City based teams ===
Club	Sport	League	Home stadium	Founded
Lyca Kovai Kings	Cricket	Tamil Nadu Premier League	SNR College Cricket Ground	2016
Chennai City F.C.	Football	I-League	Jawaharlal Nehru Stadium	2016

=== Recreation ===
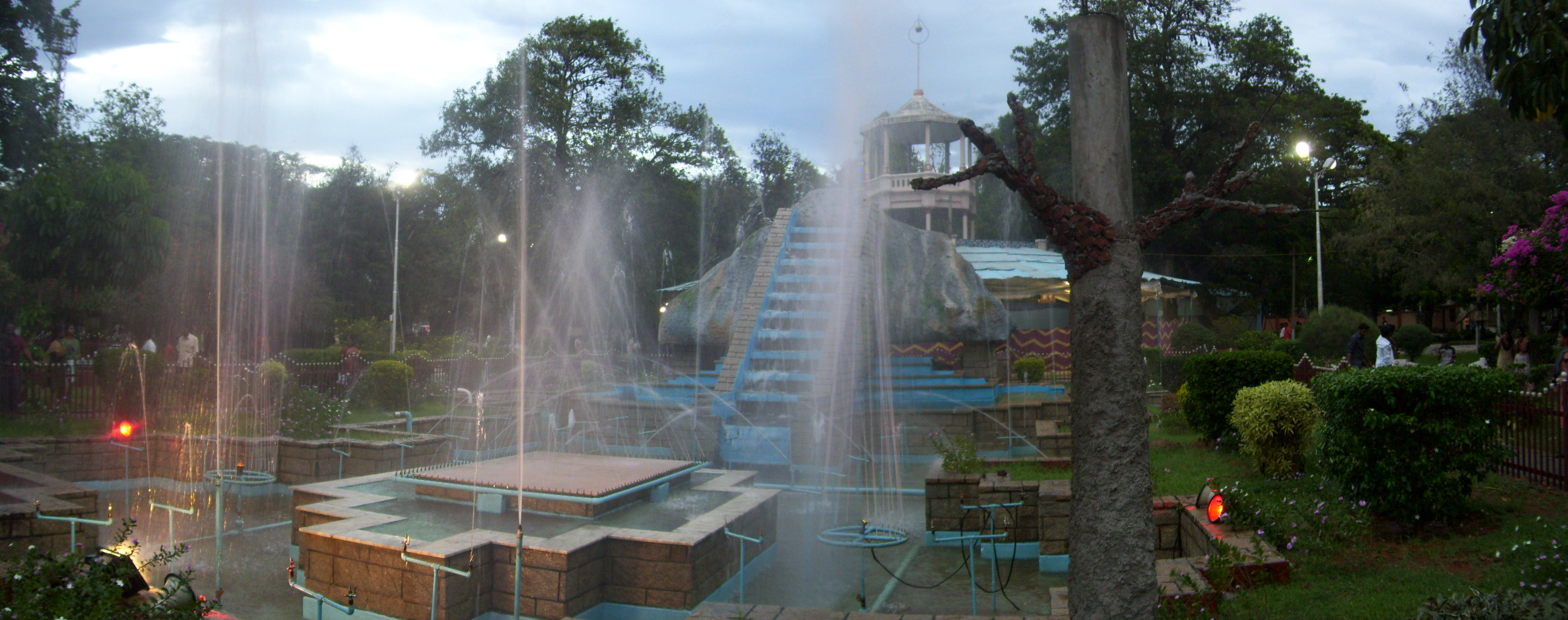
VOC park and zoo

There are several amusement parks around the city: Black Thunder water theme park near Mettupalayam, Kovai Kondattam amusement park at Perur and Maharaja Theme Park at Neelambur. Since the 1980s, the city has had a few small shopping complexes and major shopping malls include Prozone Mall, Brookefields Mall and Fun Republic Mall. The city also has a number of parks including the VOC Park, the Tamil Nadu Agricultural University Park, Race Course Children's Park and Bharathi Park in Saibaba Colony. Coimbatore Zoo houses a number of animals and birds and is located near VOC Park. The grounds are used for conducting fairs and events including the annual Independence day and Republic day celebrations. Singanallur Lake is a popular tourist place and bird watcher destination. Popular cinemas include KG Cinemas, The Cinema at Brookfields, Cinepolis at Fun Republic, INOX at Prozone, Miraj cinemas, Karpagam cinemas, Senthil Kumaran cinemas, Baba complex and Broadway cinemas.

== Environmental issues ==
Air pollution, lack of proper waste management infrastructure and degradation of water bodies are the major environmental issues in Coimbatore. There is a sewage treatment plant at Ukkadam with the capacity to process 70 million litres of sewage water per day. Garbage is collected by the corporation and sewage is pumped into the water tanks and the Noyyal River through streams. This along with garbage dumping and encroachments has led to degradation of the water bodies and depletion in the groundwater table. The tanks are renovated by the city's environmental groups with their own fund-raising and the corporation. The corporation is responsible and involved in clearing encroachment of the tanks. Siruthuli, an environmental organisation founded by the city's industrial houses, undertakes de-silting of tanks and cleaning of the Noyyal river. Environment Conservation Group based out of the city is also involved in conservation of trees and wetlands, monitoring wildlife crime and conducting awareness sessions for students.

== Sister cities ==
Coimbatore has a sister city relationship with Toledo, Ohio. The relation has enabled exchange in the fields of arts and education between the cities. A twin city pact with the German city of Esslingen was signed in July 2016, enabling the two cities to collaborate on areas of mutual interest, health, education, culture and social development.

Country	City	State / Region	Since
United States	Toledo	Ohio	2009
Germany	Esslingen	Baden-Württemberg	2016

Alliance Française de Madras, a Franco-Indian non-profit association promoting the growth of French in India, has a centre at PSG Institute of Management in Coimbatore.

== See also ==
- List of neighbourhoods of Coimbatore
- Velliangiri Mountains
- Aliyar Reservoir
- Largest Indian cities by GDP
