= Uliyampalayam =

- Neighborhood
- Location in Tamil Nadu, India
- Coordinates: 11.008170°N 76.858526°E
- Country: India
- State: Tamil Nadu
- Region: Kongu Nadu
- District: Coimbatore

Population
  - Total: 12,274

Languages
  - Official: Tamil
- Time zone: UTC+5:30 (IST)
- Postal code: 641***
- Telephone code: +91-422

Uliyampalayam is a neighborhood in Coimbatore in the Indian state of Tamil Nadu. It is located near Thondamuthur.
