= Siege of Coimbatore =

Historic Indian battle

- Part of the Third Anglo-Mysore War
Date	May – 2 November 1791
Location	Coimbatore, Tamil Nadu, India 11°00′03″N 76°57′48″E
Status	Mysorean victory

Belligerents
Kingdom of Mysore	East India Company; Travancore

Commanders and leaders
Tipu Sultan; Kamar-ud-din	(East India Company) John Chalmers (POW)

Strength
Unknown	Unknown

Casualties and losses
Unknown	Entire garrison captured

The Siege of Coimbatore was a siege conducted by forces of the Kingdom of Mysore against a garrison of British East India Company and Travancorean troops holding the fortress at Coimbatore in southern India during the Third Anglo-Mysore War. The siege ended in a Mysorean victory in November 1791, temporarily restoring Mysorean control of the fort.

== Background ==
During the Third Anglo-Mysore War, British East India Company forces under General William Medows occupied Coimbatore, then part of the Kingdom of Mysore, without resistance on 21 July 1790. The occupation formed part of a wider British campaign against Mysorean positions in southern India. Tipu Sultan subsequently recovered several territories lost during the campaign, and in 1791 Mysorean forces attempted to recapture the British-held fort at Coimbatore.

== Siege and aftermath ==
The fort was besieged by Mysorean forces in June 1791. An assault on 11 August was repelled, after which the garrison under Lieutenant John Chalmers received reinforcements. A larger Mysorean force renewed the siege in October. The initial garrison consisted of approximately 120 topasses and 200 Travancore troops, assisted by a Frenchman named Migot de la Combe. Reinforcements under Lieutenant Nash subsequently increased the garrison to around 700 men. In October, the Mysorean commander Kamar-ud-din renewed the siege with approximately 8,000 troops and fourteen guns.

The garrison eventually surrendered on 2 November. The surrender agreement reportedly allowed the garrison to withdraw to Palghat, but its commanding officers, John Chalmers and Lieutenant Nash, were instead detained and taken to Seringapatam. British commander Lord Cornwallis accused Tipu Sultan of violating the capitulation terms. The officers were treated well in captivity, and released in February 1792.

Mysore's capture of Coimbatore was a local military victory, but it did not end the wider war. British forces briefly reoccupied the town before it was restored to Tipu Sultan in 1792. Coimbatore passed into British control following the defeat of Mysore in 1799.
