= Maharaja Theme Park =

Amusement park in Tamil Nadu, India

- Location: Neelambur, Coimbatore, Tamil Nadu, India
- Status: Operating
- Opened: April 2006

Maharaja Theme Park is an amusement park located in Neelambur, Coimbatore, Tamil Nadu, India. The park also has movie screens attached with the park.

It was opened to the public in April 2006. Tamil Actor Surya opened this theme park.
