= Kovai Cora cotton =

Type of saree from Tamil Nadu, India

- Geographical indication
- Description: Cotton sarees manufactured in Coimbatore
- Type: Handicraft
- Area: Coimbatore, Tamil Nadu
- Country: India
- Registered: 2014-15
- Material: cotton

Kovai Cora cotton or Kovai Kora cotton is a type of cotton saree made in the Coimbatore region in Tamil Nadu, India. It has been recognized as a Geographical indication by the Government of India in 2014–15.

== About ==
Kovai Kora cotton is made from a blend of silk and cotton. A superior quality cotton yarn is mixed with traditional silk to produce kora cotton. The sarees have bright colored border designs with occasional use of shining zari. The required designs are weaved using the loom using combinations of colored cotton and silk threads and the borders are added later.

== Weaving ==
The kora cotton sarees are weaved on traditional hand-looms. Every saree takes up to three days for weaving and the weavers are paid ranging from ₹450 (US$4.70) to ₹850 (US$8.80) per saree. The saree is weaved by traditional weaving families in the districts of Coimbatore, Tiruppur and Erode in the Kongu Nadu region of Tamil Nadu. Sirumugai in Coimbatore district is the major producer of kora cotton sarees.

== Sales ==
82 co-operative societies in the districts of Coimbatore, Tiruppur and Erode have been certified as authorized dealers of Kovai Kora cotton by the Government of Tamil Nadu. Kora cotton sarees are priced between ₹800 (US$8.30) to ₹1,200 (US$12). The sales of kora cotton sarees have seen a decline over the last three decades due to change in dressing preferences of women. Soft silk sarees look grander and colorful with designer blouses. Lower demand and higher remunerations for weaving soft silk sarees have led to weavers switching to weaving silk sarees. The GI tag helped increase sales by 15% in 2014-15. But the spike in demand was able to convince weavers to switch back to weaving kora sarees and the sales declined the following year. The Government of Tamil Nadu sells the sarees through government run Co-optex stores.

== Competition ==
Kora cotton sarees weaved from traditional hand-looms face competition from cheaper cotton sarees weaved through power-looms. The cotton sarees produced through power-looms cost ₹400 (US$4.20) to ₹600 (US$6.20) compared to hand woven sarees which cost between ₹900 (US$9.30) and ₹1,200 (US$12) per saree. High excise duty on yarn used by the hand-looms leading to higher production costs and greater efficiency of power-looms have contributed to the fall in demand for hand woven kora cotton sarees. Weavers have often demanded assistance from the Government of Tamil Nadu for subsidizing production.

== Geographical Indication ==
In 2014, the Government of Tamil Nadu applied for Geographical Indication for Kovai Kora cotton sarees. The Government of India recognized it as a Geographical indication officially since the year 2014-15.
