= Thandu Mariamman Temple =

Hindu temple in India

- Location within Tamil Nadu

Religion
- Affiliation: Hinduism
- Deity: Mariamman

Location
- Location: Coimbatore
- State: Tamil Nadu
- Country: India
- Coordinates: 11°00′09″N 76°58′04″E

Architecture
- Type: Dravidian

Thandu Mariamman Temple is a Hindu temple dedicated to Thandu Mariamman located in Uppilipalayam, Coimbatore, Tamil Nadu, India. According to mythology, the goddess is said to have cured the soldiers of the ruler of Kongu Nadu from chicken pox. The annual car festival celebrated in April is one of the important religious festivals in the region.
