= Loga Nayaga Shaniswara Temple =

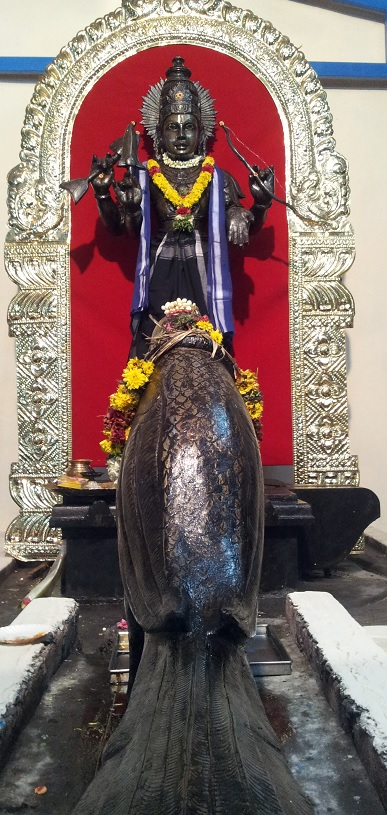

- Location within Tamil Nadu

Religion
- Affiliation: Hinduism
- District: Coimbatore district
- Deity: Shani

Location
- Location: Puliakulam, Coimbatore
- State: Tamil Nadu
- Country: India
- Interactive map of Loga Nayaga Shaniswara Temple
- Coordinates: 11°01′16″N 76°59′49″E

Loga Nayaga Shaniswara temple is located at Puliakulam, Coimbatore, Tamil Nadu. The temple is located adjacent to Puliakulam Mariamman temple and the main deity is Shani. The idol of Shani is 7 feet (2.1 m) tall and is made of iron. A crow which is the mount of Shani, made also of iron stands in front of the main deity.
