= Kosar people =

Group in ancient Tamil

The Kosar people are a group of individuals mentioned in the ancient Tamil literature.

== History ==
In Tolkapium (100BCE) Akam 281, the Kosars are believed to be a North Karnataka power that had an alliance with the Maurya Empire.

In Akam 281 AD, the Kosars are considered to be a force in Northern Karnataka allied with the Mauryans. In Tamil literature, the Kosars are mentioned as Western Vadukas originating from Kolhapur near Goa.

Erattar is a tributary of the Kosars, who later became Maha Lathilal (Prakrit) or Maharashtran (Sanskrit). The historian Mr. Burnell also acknowledges this. Kosar was called Nar Kosar or Nammoj Kosar in the 3rd Sangam Document. Nannur or Turkappyam records them as Kannadam (Kannadigas), Vaduk (Tur), Kalingam (Orya) and Telugu.

Kanbalamayanam Payram states that the Khosars were Vadakarai (Prakrit), Tenkarai (Tamil), Vaduk and Kannada. The Khosars were loyal to their king and were called Vaimoj Khosars.

Maturai Kanchi 508-09 and 771–74 record: "Poya Narisai Nirta Punaitar, Perum Peyal Malan Talaivan Aka, Kadantadu Vai Val Elampal Kosar, Eyaneri Malabin Vai Moj Kepa" and "Pazayan Mokor Avayakam Vilanka Nammoji Kosar Tontori Yanna". The Nedungchejian military commander of the Pandyan dynasty was Mohor Pazayan Maran. There were also Cossars in his army.

They heeded Malan's word in battle, and he was praised for his service at court. The Erampal Kosars (young Kosars) were enlisted in Chela's army. Mr Shirapatikkaram states that Konkiram Kosar was in the Kong Army (Kong Nadu). The Prakrit form of Vaimoji Kosar is Satya Petilal, and the Asokan inscriptions refer to Vadukus by this name.

AKananoor 15, 2-7 Records: "Tokai Kavin Tulu Nattu Anna Varunkai Vamparais Sankumu Pampin Chelinta Seri Chemal Mootur".

He then occupied Kudak Nadu and Erumai Nadu and settled in Tulu Nadu with Muttur as its capital.
