= Arulmigu Koniamman Temple =

Historic Hindu temple in Coimbatore, Tamil Nadu, India

- அருள்மிகு கோனியம்மன் திருக்கோயில்
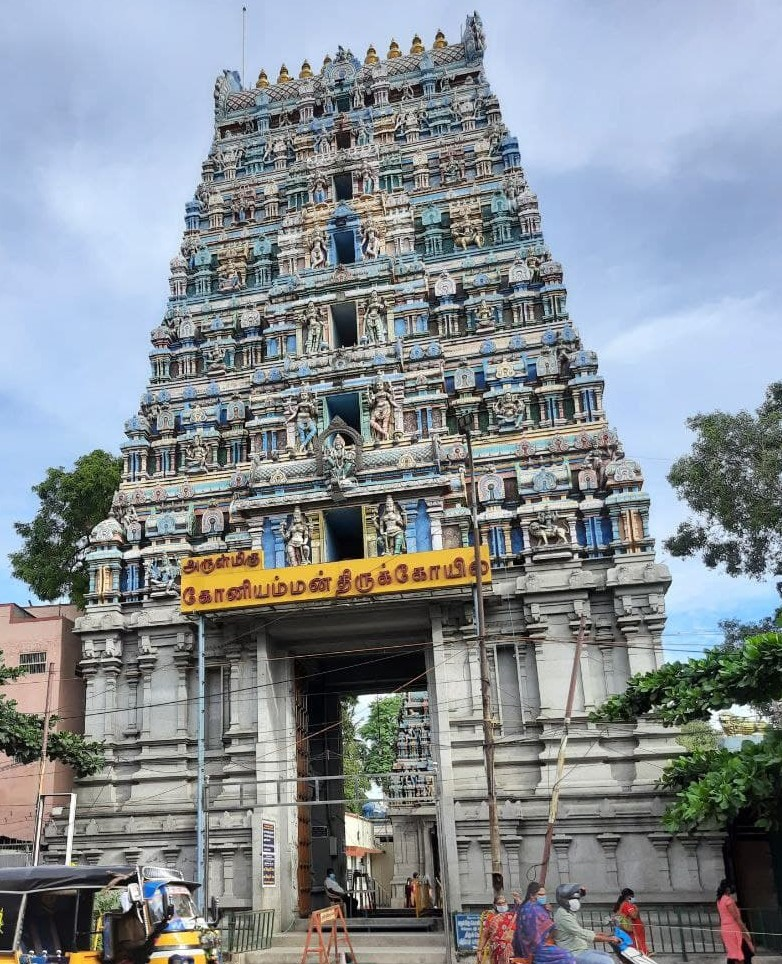

Religion
- Affiliation: Hinduism
- District: Coimbatore
- Deity: Koniamman
- Festival: Koniamman Kovil Therotta Thiruvizha
- Governing body: Hindu Religious and Charitable Endowments Department

Location
- Location: Big Bazaar Street, Town Hall, Coimbatore
- State: Tamil Nadu
- Country: India
- Interactive map of Arulmigu Koniamman Temple
- Coordinates: 10.990213°N 76.962868°E

Architecture
- Type: Dravidian architecture
- Elevation: 411 m (1,348 ft)

Website
- http://www.kovaikoniamman.tnhrce.in/ Kovai Koniamman Temple

Arulmigu Koniamman Temple, is a historic Hindu temple located on the northern bank of the Noyyal River of Coimbatore, Tamil Nadu, India. It is dedicated to the goddess Koniamman, a form of Parvati. The temple is at the center of the city of Coimbatore in the core of the city, Town Hall, Coimbatore, Tamil Nadu, India. Koniamman is the "Guardian Deity" of the city. This temple is one of the twin historic temples in the city, the other being Perur Pateeswarar Temple.

== Etymology ==
Koyamma, the goddess worshiped by chieftain Kovan evolved into Koniamma and the name of the city Koyampuththoor could have been derived from Kovaiamma.

== History ==
The temple was built during 11th century by the descendants of chieftain "Kovan".

== Architecture ==
An 84 feet (26 m) gopuram, the tallest in the entire region was completed in 2011 at a cost of ₹1.75 crore (US$180,000) by the Government of Tamilnadu.

== Car Festival ==
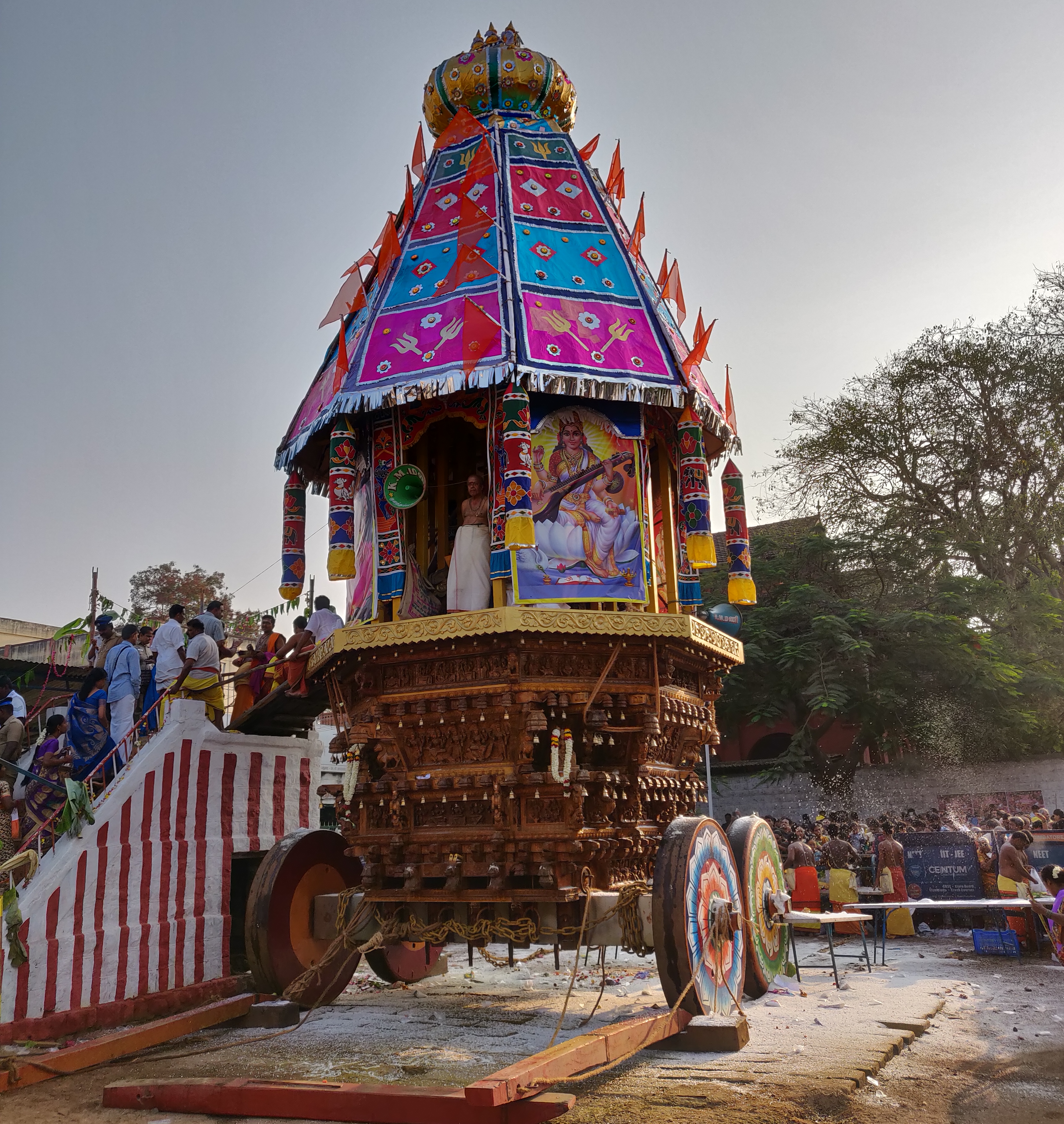
Temple car on 6 March 2019

The car festival of Koniamman Temple is conducted during the month of Panguni, which is the most prominent local festival in the city. Then the thirukalyana vaibogam, the marriage ceremony of Koniamman, Kudndam vizha and Temple float festival takes place.
