= Hinduism and LGBTQ topics =

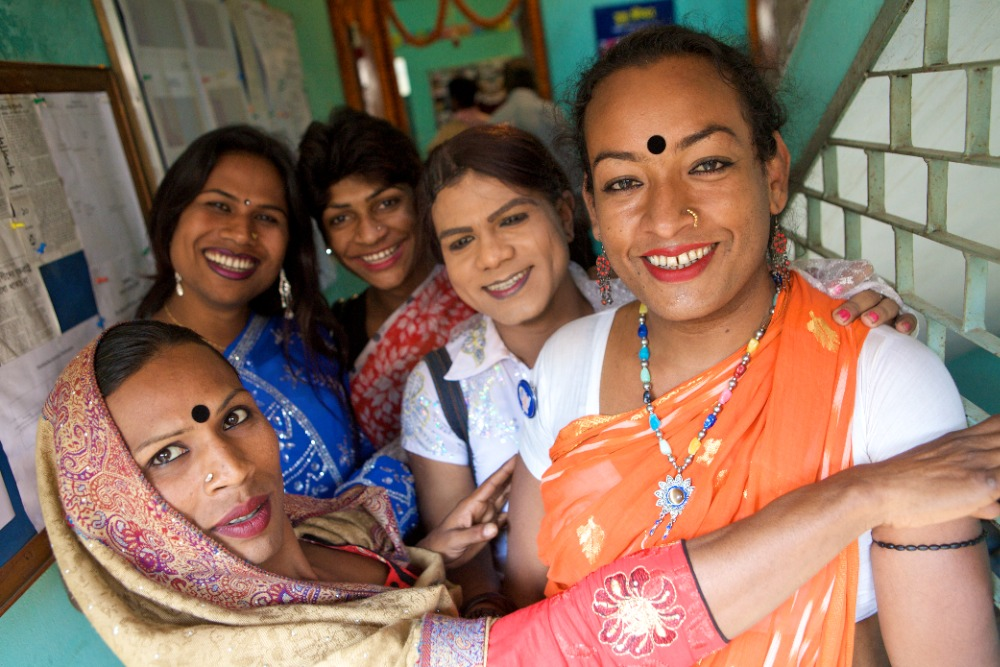
Hijra people in Bangladesh.

Hindu views of homosexuality and LGBTQ (lesbian, gay, bisexual, and transgender) issues more generally are diverse, and different Hindu groups have distinct views. Hinduism describes a third gender that is equal to other genders and documentation of the third gender are found in ancient Hindu and Buddhist medical texts. The Kamasutra mentions Hijras and relations with them, and there are several Hindu temples which have carvings that depict both men and women engaging in sexual acts with Hijras. There are numerous cases of Hindu deities and figures that had physically transformed to different genders.

Hindu texts largely don't discriminate between heterosexual and homosexual acts, however they do explicitly mention procreative and non-procreative sexual acts. The Arthashastra argues that homosexual intercourse is an offence, and encourages chastity. The Dharmashastra recognises the existence of homosexuality, and openly condemns non-vaginal sex in religious or moral terms. The Manusmriti regards homosexual (as well as heterosexual) acts in an ox cart as a source of ritual pollution. These commentaries were written as guides for sexual misconduct (heterosexual and homosexual). In the Manusmirti and the Arthashastra of Kautilya, homosexual contact is compared to having sex with menstruating woman, which is sinful and demands a purification ritual. The Dharmashastras perceives advantage of conceiving sons by heterosexual marriage, the Dharmsastras are against non-vaginal sex like the Vashistha Dharmasutra. The Yājñavalkya Smṛti prescribes fines for such acts including those with other men.

The Manusmriti provides punishment to homosexual men and women. Manusmriti says that if a girl has sex with another girl, she is liable for a fine of two hundred coins and ten whiplashes. But if lesbian sex is performed by a mature woman on a girl, her head should be shaved or two of her fingers cut off as punishment. The woman should also be made to ride on a donkey. In the case of homosexual males, Manusmriti says that sexual union between with two men brings loss of caste. If a man has sex with non-human females or with another man or indulges in anal or oral sex with women he is liable for punishment as per the "Painful Heating Vow".

Arthashastra of Kautilya a treatise on politics mentions homosexuality. But says its the duty of the king to punish those indulging in homosexuality and expects the ruler to fight against the "social evil".

In the Mahābhārata it disapproves of sex between men. The words used are viyoni maithuna (13.145.53) this means sex (maithuna) which is other than vaginal (viyoni). Śiva tells Pārvatī that one who performs such an act will be born impotent. A similar statement is made in the next verse (13.145.54). The words used are prakīrṇa-maithuna common meanings of this word are scattered, dispersed, mixed, confused, loose, and miscellaneous.

There have been cases of some Hindu priests performing same sex marriages in temples since the independence from colonialism, although the majority continue to oppose it.

In 2009, the Delhi High Court legalised homosexuality in India, but the Supreme Court of India subsequently overturned the high court's decision. The Supreme Court of India, in a later ruling in 2018, reversed its previous verdict and decriminalised homosexual intercourse and relationships. However, in November 2023, the Supreme Court ruled that same-sex couples have no legal right to marry each other.

== Contemporary Hindu society ==
"Hindu society had a clear cut idea of all these people in the past. Now that we have put them under one label ‘LGBT’, there is lot more confusion and other identities have got hidden."

— Gopi Shankar Madurai in National Queer Conference 2013

Sexuality is rarely discussed openly in contemporary Hindu society, especially in modern India where homosexuality was illegal until a brief period beginning in 1860, due to colonial British laws. In 2009, The Delhi High Court in a historic judgement decriminalised homosexuality in India; where the court noted that the existing laws violated fundamental rights to personal liberty (Article 21 of the Indian Constitution) and equality (Article 14) and prohibition of discrimination (Article 15). However, the Supreme Court of India re-affirmed the penal code provision and overturned the Delhi High Court decision, effectively re-instating the legal ban on homosexuality in which penalties included life imprisonment until September 6, 2018, when Supreme Court of India decriminalised homosexuality. Furthermore, LGBT people are often subjected to torture, executions and fines by non-government affiliated vigilante groups.

A 2019 survey by the Center for Regional Political Economy at Azim Premji University of participants from eleven Indian states found that 22% of Hindus, the highest of any religious group polled, believed same-sex relationships should be accepted by society; approximately 30% had no opinion, while approximately 40% somewhat or fully disagreed. In the diaspora, open acceptance appears to be higher; a survey by Pew Research Center found that 88% of Hindus in the United States supported legal same-sex marriage; 78% stated homosexuality should be accepted, and 67% stated greater acceptance of transgender people was a positive change in society.

Hindu nationalist factions have a varied opinion on the legalisation of homosexuality. In the last thirty years, homosexuality has become increasingly visible in the print and audio-visual media, with many out LGBT people, an active LGBT movement, and a large Indian LGBT presence on the Internet. From the 1990s onward, modern gay and lesbian Hindu organizations have surfaced in India's major cities and in 2004, plausible calls were made for the first time to repeal India's laws against homosexuality.

Deepa Mehta's 1996 film Fire, which depicts a romantic relationship between two Hindu women, was informally banned for "religious insensitivity" after the screening of the movie was disrupted on the grounds that it denigrated Indian culture, not on the grounds of homophobia per se, a position shared and confirmed by feminist Madhu Kishwar. In addition, Bharatiya Janata Party who were in power in India at the time, refused to ban it. Similar protests occurred in 2004 against the lesbian-themed film Girlfriend — even though the portrayal of lesbianism was this time distinctly unsympathetic. Several human-rights groups such as the People's Union for Civil Liberties have asserted that sexual minorities in India face severe discrimination and violence, especially those from rural and lower-caste backgrounds.

In her book, Love's Rite, Ruth Vanita examines the phenomenon of same-sex weddings, many by Hindu rites, which have been reported by the Indian press over the last thirty years and with increasing frequency. In the same period, same-sex joint suicides have also been reported. Most of these marriages and suicides are by lower-middle-class female couples from small towns and rural areas across the country; these women have no contact with any LGBT movements. Both cross-sex and same-sex couples, when faced with family opposition, tend to resort to either elopement and marriage or to joint suicide in the hope of reunion in the next life. Vanita examines how Hindu doctrines such as rebirth and the genderlessness of the soul are often interpreted to legitimize socially disapproved relationships, including same-sex ones. In a 2004 survey, most — though not all — swamis said they opposed the concept of a Hindu-sanctified gay marriage. But several Hindu priests have performed same-sex marriages, arguing that love is the result of attachments from previous births and that marriage, as a union of spirit, is transcendental to gender.

Later, Vanita condenses the ideas in her book into an article, "Same-sex Weddings, Hindu Traditions and Modern India". Here, she summarizes specific cases in which women specifically committed joint-suicides, were married and separated, or successfully married. She points out three different "forces that have helped female couples". These are: the law courts, the media, and some Hindu authorities (such as the swamis mentioned earlier in this article) from her book. When female couples can stay together under the social pressures and get to the courts, the courts generally hold up their decisions, holding to the fact that the women are consenting adults. While this does not necessarily stop the harassment, it does lend the couple further legitimacy under the laws. In addition, the more successful same-sex marriages of women are those in which the women are financially independent. If they have social support from their families and community—for the most part—then they may be able to live in peace together. The media may also play an important role in same-sex marriages. In drawing attention to their marriages, women who do not necessarily know about LGBT rights groups may be contacted and supported by those groups after media attention. However, the flip side of this is that the anti-LGBT groups also may reach out against their marriage.

Psychoanalyst Sudhir Kakar writes that Hindus are more accepting of "deviance or eccentricity" than are adherents of Western religions, who typically treat sexual variance as "anti-social or psychopathological, requiring 'correction' or 'cure'". Hindus, he argues, believe instead that each individual must fulfill their personal destiny (svadharma) as they travel the path towards moksha (transcendence).

Commenting on the legalisation of homosexuality in India; Anil Bhanot, general secretary of The United Kingdom Hindu Council said: "The point here is that the homosexual nature is part of the natural law of God; it should be accepted for what it is, no more and no less. Hindus are generally conservative but it seems to me that in ancient India, they even celebrated sex as an enjoyable part of procreation, where priests were invited for ceremonies in their home to mark the beginning of the process."

== The third gender ==
Hindu philosophy has the concept of a third sex or third gender (Sanskrit: तृतीय प्रकृति, tŕtīya-prakŕti – literally, "third nature"). This category includes a wide range of people with mixed male and female natures such as effeminate males, masculine females, transgender people, transsexual people, intersex people, androgynes, and so on. Many MTF third-genders are not attracted only or at all to men, but are attracted either exclusively to women or are bisexual. Many FTM transgender people are attracted to men. Such persons are not considered fully male or female in traditional Hinduism, being a combination of both. They are mentioned as third sex by nature (birth) and are not expected to behave like cisgender men and women. They often keep their own societies or town quarters, perform specific occupations (such as masseurs, hairdressers, flower-sellers, domestic servants, etc.) and are generally attributed a semi-divine status. Their participation in religious ceremonies, especially as cross-dressing dancers and devotees of certain temple gods/goddesses, is considered auspicious in traditional Hinduism. Some Hindus believe that third-sex people have special powers allowing them to bless or curse others. In general, Hindus observe third gender or LGBT as spiritually equivalent to heterosexuals.

In 2008, the state of Tamil Nadu recognised the "Third Gender"; with its civil supplies department giving in the ration card a provision for a new sex column as 'T', distinct from the usual 'M' and 'F' for males and females respectively. This was the first time that authorities anywhere in India have officially recognised the third gender.

== Hindu religious narratives ==
In the Hindu narrative tradition, stories of gods and mortals changing gender occur. Sometimes they also engage in heterosexual activities as different reincarnated genders. Homosexual and transgender Hindus commonly identify with and worship the various Hindu deities connected with gender diversity such as Bahuchara Mata (a goddess connected with transsexuality and eunuchism), Gadadhara (an incarnation of Radha in male form), Bhagavati-devi (a Hindu goddess associated with cross-dressing), Gangamma (a goddess connected with cross-dressing and disguises) and the goddess Yellamma. There are also specific festivals connected to the worship of these deities, some of which are famous in India for their cross-dressing devotees. These festivals include the Aravan Festival of Koovagam, the Bahuchara Mata Festivals of Gujarat and the Yellamma Festivals of Karnataka, among others.

Gender variance is also observed in heroes in Hindu scriptures. The Hindu epic Mahabharata narrates that the hero Arjuna takes a vow to live as a member of the third sex for a year as the result of a curse he is compelled to honor. He thus transforms into Brihannala, a member of the third gender, for a year and becomes a dance teacher to a princess. Another important character, Shikhandi, is born female, but raised as a man and even married to a woman. She becomes male due to the grace of a Yaksha. Shikhandi eventually becomes the reason for the death of the warrior Bhishma, who refuses to fight a "woman." Another character, Bhishma appeases Yudhishtira's curiosity about relative enjoyment of partners during sex by relating the story of King Bhangasvana, who has had a hundred sons is turned into a woman while on a hunt. She returns to her kingdom, relates the story, turns the kingdom over to her children and retires to the forest to be the spouse of a hermit, by whom she has a hundred more sons. Ila, a king from Hindu narratives, is also known for their gender changes.

Some versions of the Krittivasa Ramayana, the most popular Bengali text on the pastimes of Ramachandra (an incarnation of Vishnu), relate a story of two queens who conceived a child together. When the king of the Sun Dynasty, Maharaja Dilipa, died, the demigods become concerned that he did not have a son to continue his line. Shiva, therefore, appeared before the king's two widowed queens and commanded them, "You two make love together and by my blessings, you will bear a beautiful son." The two wives, with great affection for each other, executed Shiva's order until one of them conceived a child. The sage Astavakra accordingly named the child "Bhagiratha" – he who was born from two vulvas. Bhagiratha later became a king and is credited with bringing the river Ganges down to earth through his austerities.

== Hindu Texts ==
People of a third gender (tritiya-prakriti), not fully men nor women, are mentioned here and there throughout Hindu texts such as the Puranas but are not specifically defined. In general, they are portrayed as effeminate men, often cowardly, and with no desire for women. Modern readers often draw parallels between these and modern stereotypes of lesbian, gay, bisexual and transgender people. The general thought or the decree in the context of dharma is that it is well indeed considered as a sin.

Historians Ruth Vanita and Saleem Kidwai, in their book Same-Sex Love in India: Readings from Literature and History, compiled extracts from Indian texts, from ancient to modern times, including many Hindu texts, translated from 15 Indian languages. In their accompanying analytical essays, they also wrote that Hindu texts have discussed and debated same-sex desire from the earliest times, in tones ranging from critical to non-judgmental to playful and celebratory.

=== Dharmashastras ===
The Dharmashastras especially later ones prescribed against non-vaginal sex like the Vashistha Dharmasutra. The Yājñavalkya Smṛti prescribes fines for such acts including those with other men. Atri Smriti, Baudhāyana Dharmasūtra, and the Apastambha Dharmasūtra do treat homosexual sex (as well as heterosexual sex) as a sin, in some cases legally punishable. In the Manusmriti, there are proposals for various punishments for homosexual sex in certain cases (along with heterosexual sex too). A mature woman having sex with a maiden girl was punished by having her head shaved or two of her fingers cut off, and she was also made to ride on a donkey. In the case of homosexual male sex, the Manusmriti dictated that sexual union between two people (both homosexual and heterosexual) in a bullock cart as a source of ritual pollution. Verse 8.367 contains a similar punishment for all those who do it regardless of gender. The emphasis Vanita states here is on a maiden's sexual purity. The Manusmriti is less judgmental about LGBT relationships. XI. 174 prescribes eating the five products of the cow or Panchagavya and foregoing food for a night for several sexual acts committed by a man including those with other men. XI. 175 states that those men who engage in intercourse with a man should take a bath while being clothed. According to XI.68, a man who engages in such acts is traditionally considered to lose his caste, though Ruth Vanita suggests the prescriptions by Manusmriti act as a substitute.

=== Kama Sutra ===
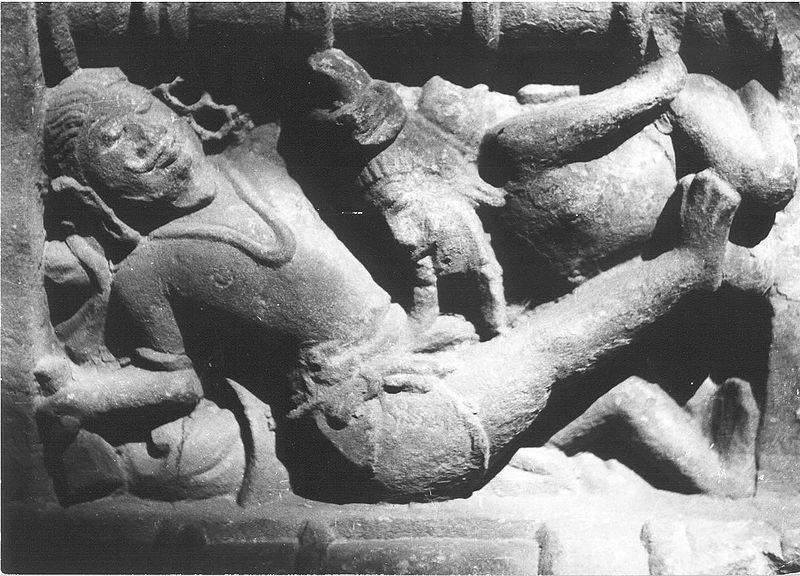
At the Lakshmana temple in Khajuraho (954 CE), a man receives fellatio from a seated male as part of an orgiastic scene.

The Kama Sutra is an ancient text dealing with kama or desire (of all kinds), which in Hindu thought is one of the four normative and spiritual goals of life. The Kama Sutra is the earliest extant and most important work in the Kama Shastra tradition of Sanskrit literature. It was compiled by the philosopher Vatsyayana around the 4th century, from earlier texts, and describes Third gender practices in several places, as well as a range of sex/gender 'types'. The author acknowledges that these relations also involve love and a bond of trust.

The author describes techniques by which masculine and feminine types of the third sex (tritiya-prakriti), as well as women, perform fellatio. The Second Part, Ninth Chapter of Kama Sutra specifically describes two kinds of men that we would recognize today as masculine- and feminine-type homosexuals but which are mentioned in older, Victorian British translations as simply "eunuchs." The chapter describes their appearances – feminine types dressed up as women whereas masculine types maintained muscular physiques and grew small beards, mustaches, etc. – and their various professions as masseurs, barbers and prostitutes are all described. Such Third gender people were also known to marry, according to the Kama Sutra: "There are also third-sex citizens, sometimes greatly attached to one another and with complete faith in one another, who get married together." (KS 2.9.36). In the "Jayamangala" of Yashodhara, an important twelfth-century commentary on the Kama Sutra, it is also stated: "Citizens with this kind of inclination, can do without them willingly because they love one another, get married together, bound by a deep and trusting friendship. However, they are not considered as dharma at all."

=== Other Scriptures ===
The Narada Purana in 1.15.936 states that those who have non-vaginal intercourse will go to Retobhojana where they have to live on semen. Ruth Vanita states that the punishment in the afterlife suggested by it is comical and befitting the act. The Skanda Purana states that those who indulge in such acts will acquire impotency.

The Arthashastra of Kautilya represents the principle text of secular law and illustrates the attitude of the judiciary towards sexual matters. Heterosexual vaginal sex is proposed as the norm by this text and legal issues arising from deviation therefrom are punishable by fines and in extreme cases by capital punishment. Homosexual acts are cited as a small offence punishable by a fine. It punishes non-vaginal sex with a small fine (4; 23; 326); however, women are fined less than men.

The Sushruta Samhita also mentions the possibility of two women uniting and becoming pregnant as a result of the mingling of their sexual fluids. It states that the child born of such a union will be "boneless." Such a birth is indeed described in the Krittivasa Ramayana of Bengal (see below).

Other texts list the various types of men who are impotent with women (known in Sanskrit as sandha, kliba, napumsaka, and panda). The Sabda-kalpa-druma Sanskrit-Sanskrit dictionary, for instance, lists twenty types, as does the Kamatantra and Smriti-Ratnavali of Vacaspati (14th century). The Narada Smriti similarly lists fourteen different types. Included among the lists are transgender people (sandha), intersex people (nisarga), and three different types of homosexual men (mukhebhaga, kumbhika and asekya). Such texts demonstrate that third-sex terms like sandha and napumsaka actually refer to many different types of "men who are impotent with women," and that simplistic definition such as "eunuch" or "neuter" may not always be accurate and in some cases totally incorrect. In his article Homosexuality and Hinduism, Arvind Sharma expresses his doubt over the common English translation of words like kliba into "eunuch" as follows: "The limited practice of castration in India raises another point significant for the rest of the discussion, namely, whether rendering a word such as "kliba" as "eunuch" regularly is correct..."

The digest or dharmanibandha work "Dandaviveka'" written by Vardhamana Upadhyaya in 15th century in Mithila pronounced that semen shouldn't ejaculate outside the vagina. Ayoni sex here is divided into two categories, one which includes intercourse with humans of both genders.

== Third-gender Hindu sects ==
Below are listed some of the most common third-gender sects found in Hinduism. There are an estimated half million crossdressing "eunuchs" in modern-day India, associated with various sects, temples and Hindu deities. Despite being called "eunuchs", the majority of these persons (91%) do not practice castration but are more accurately associated with transgender.

=== The Hijra ===
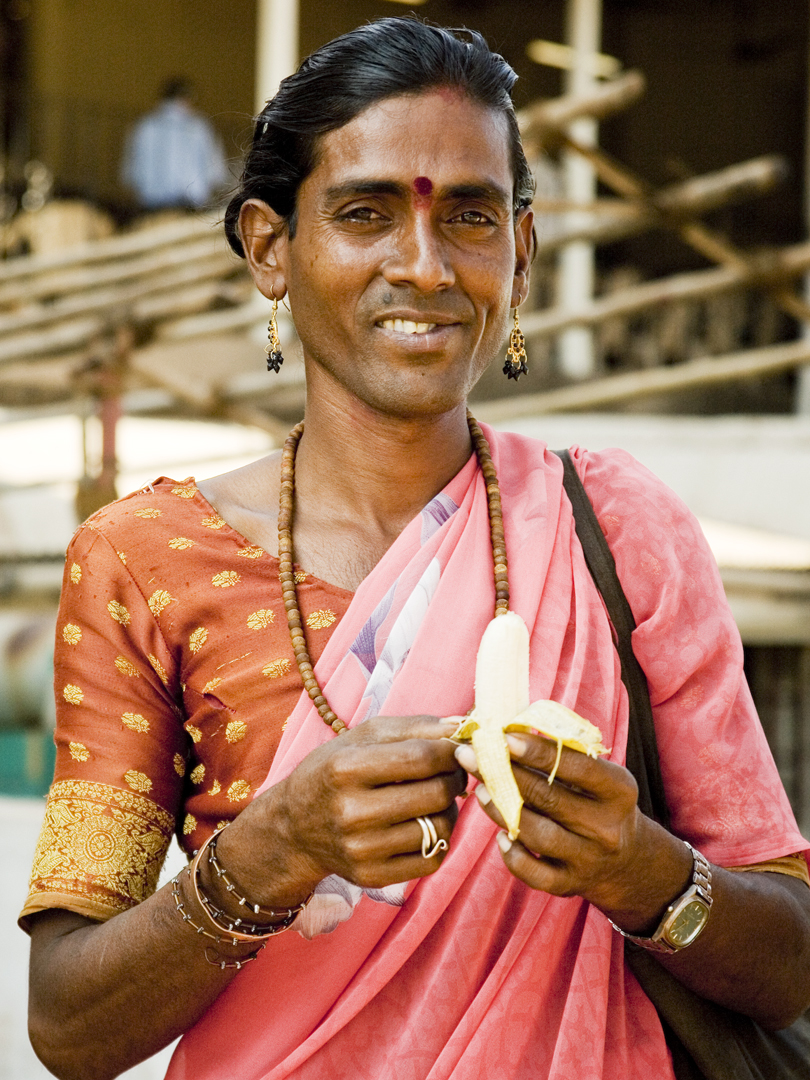
A Hijra

The Hijras are a third-gender group in the Indian subcontinent. Some of them undergo castration, which is connected to Bahuchara Mata who is identified with the earth goddess. According to legends, she cut off her breasts in order to avoid rape by a group of bandits. The operation is termed by them nirvan. They compare it with tapas which consists of avoiding sex. Also used to justify emasculation is a creation myth of Shiva who emasculated himself. The aravanis also undergo castration. Hijras also use Arjuna becoming a eunuch during exile as a result of a curse as a justification for castration. Despite this, all the seven major hijra clans are claimed to have been established by Muslims.

There are an estimated 50,000 hijra in northern India. After interviewing and studying the hijra for many years, Serena Nanda writes in her book, Neither Man Nor Woman: The hijras of India, as follows: "There is a widespread belief in India that hijras are born intersex and are taken away by the hijra community at birth or in childhood, but I found no evidence to support this belief among the hijras I met, all of whom joined the community voluntarily, often in their teens." Nanda also states: "There is absolutely no question that at least some hijras – perhaps even the majority – are homosexual prostitutes. Sinha's (1967) study of hijras in Lucknow, in North India, acknowledges the hijra role as performers, but views the major motivation for recruitment to the hijra community as the satisfaction of the individual's homosexual urges..." The hijras especially worship Bahuchara, the Hindu goddess presiding over transsexuality.

=== The Aravani or Ali ===
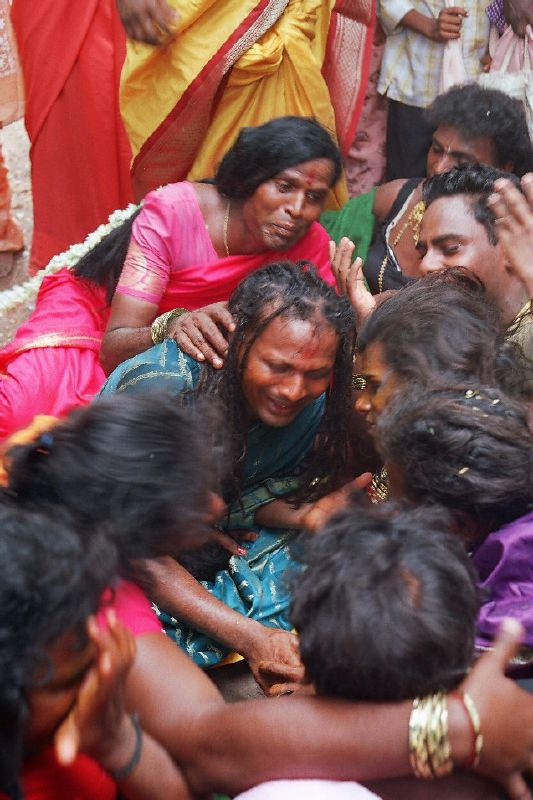
Aravanis – the "brides" of Aravan, mourn his death

The most numerous third-gender sect (estimated at 150,000) is the aravani or ali of Tamil Nadu in southern India. The aravanis are typically transgender and their main festival, the popular Koovagam or Aravan Festival celebrated in late April/early May, is attended by thousands, including many transgender people and homosexuals. The aravani worship the Hindu god, Aravan, and do not practice any system of castration.

=== The Jogappa ===
A lesser-known third-gender sect in India is the jogappa of South India (Karnataka and Andhra Pradesh), a group similarly associated with prostitution. The jogappa are connected with the goddess Yellamma (Renuka), and include both transgender people and homosexuals. Both serve as dancers and prostitutes, and they are usually in charge of the temple devadasis (maidservants of the goddess who similarly serve as dancers and female courtesans). Large festivals are celebrated at these temples wherein hundreds of scantily-clad devadasis and jogappas parade through the streets. The jogappa do not practice castration.

== Religious art ==
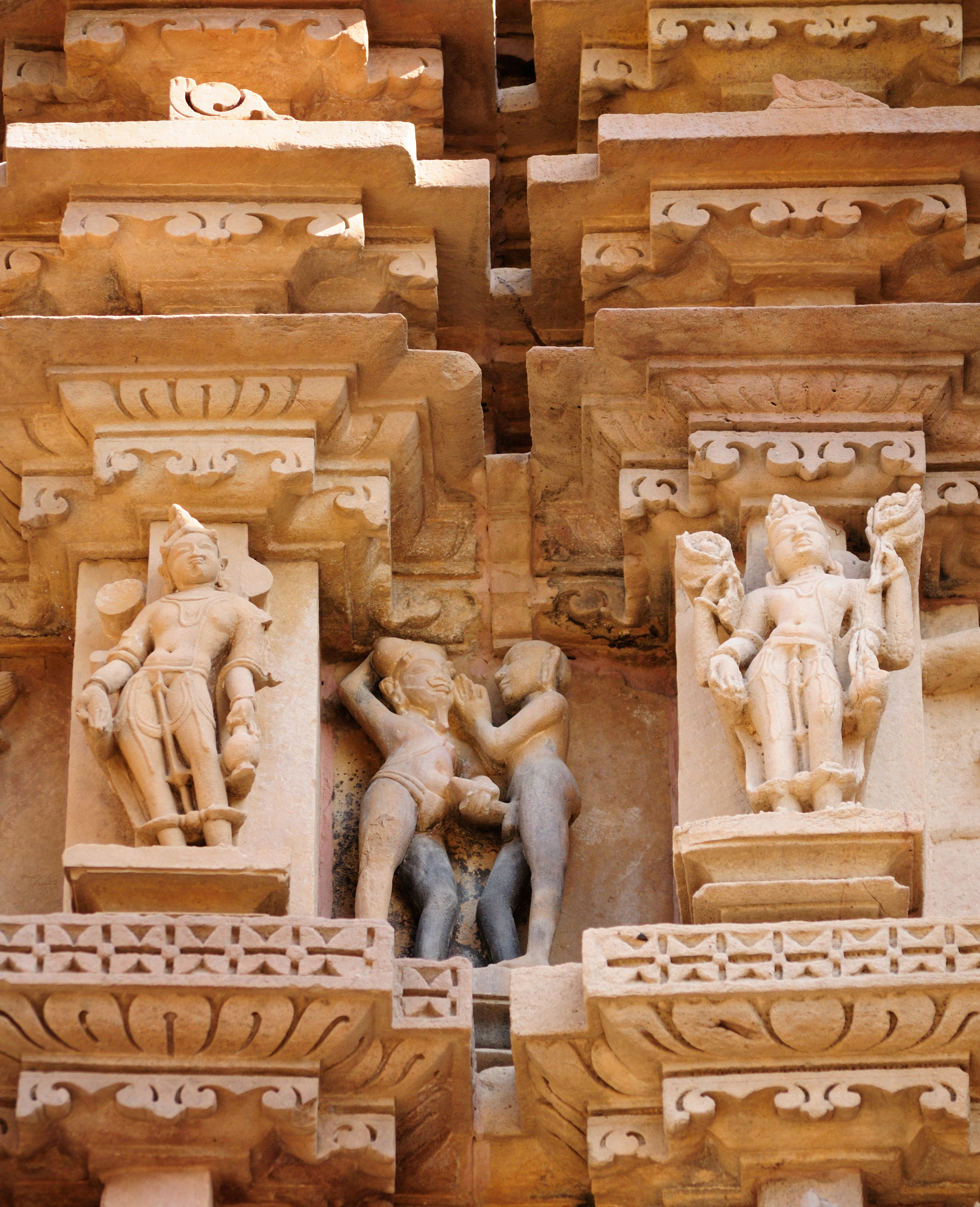
Khajoraho scene where one man reaches out to another's erect penis

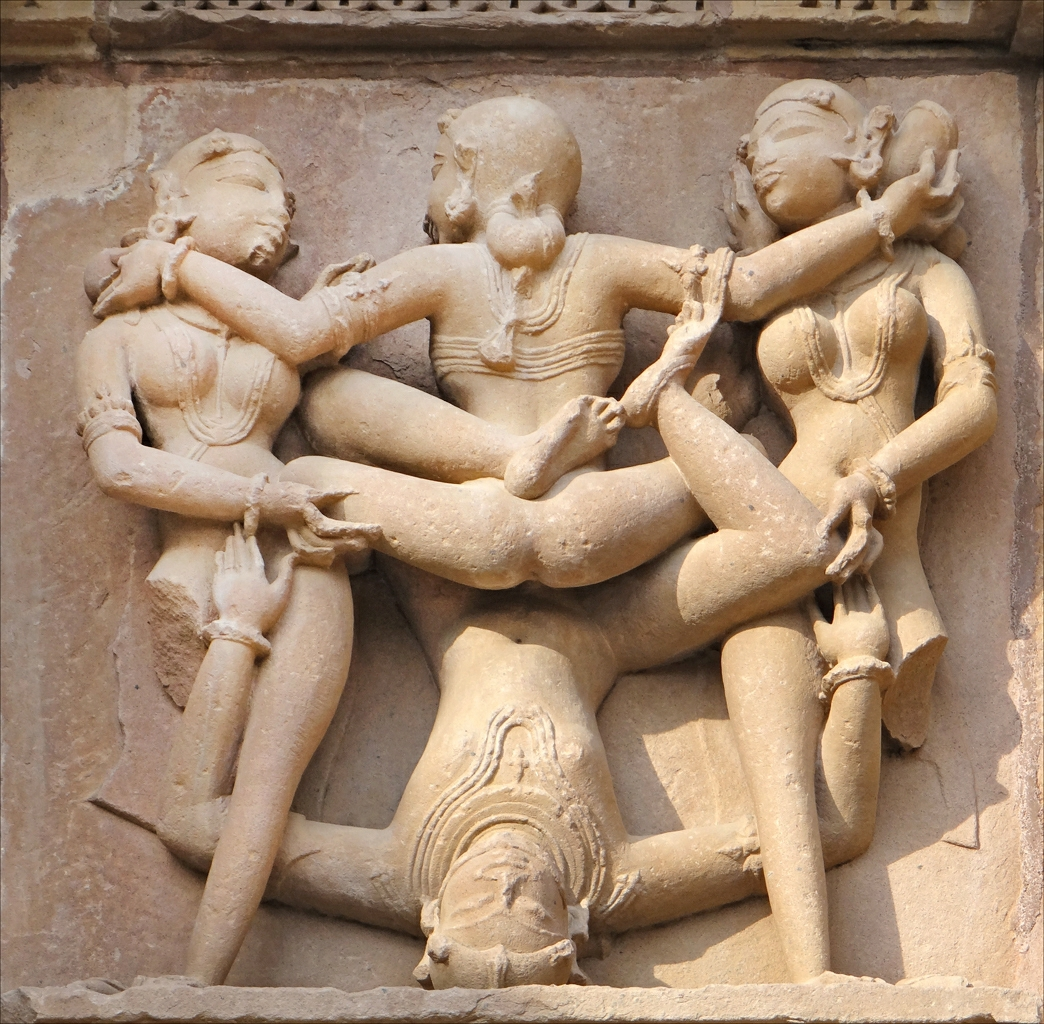
Khajoraho scene of three women and one man.

Medieval Hindu temples such as those at Khajuraho depict sexual acts in sculptures on the external walls. Some of these scenes involve same-sex sexuality:

- A sculpture at the Kandariya Mahadeva temple in Khajuraho portrays a man reaching out to another's erect penis.
- An orgiastic group of three women and one man, on the southern wall of the Kandariya Mahadeva temple in Khajuraho. One of the women is caressing another.
- At the Lakshmana temple in Khajuraho (954 CE), a man receives fellatio from a seated male as part of an orgiastic scene.
- At the Rajarani Temple in Bhubaneswar, Odisha, dating from the 10th or 11th century, a sculpture depicts two women engaged in oral sex.
- A 12th-century Shiva temple in Bagali, Karnataka depicts a scene of apparent oral sex between two males on a sculpture below the shikhara.
- At Padhavli near Gwalior, a ruined temple from the 10th century shows a man within an orgiastic group receiving fellatio from another male.
- An 11th-century lifesize sandstone sculpture from Odisha, now in the Seattle Art Museum, shows Kama, the god of love, shooting a flower tipped arrow at two women who are embracing one another.

== Same-sex marriage ==
A Gandharava marriage was the most common form of marriage for lay people described in classical Indian literature and was heavily associated with village life. A Gandharava was a low ranking male deity who had a symbolic association with fine and creative arts, specifically music, with strong connections to sexuality and procreation, and the term is etymologically linked to "fragrance", and these males are commonly pared with females called "Apsaras" who are associated with the arts, dancing and literature. There are punishments for homosexual sex listed in numerous texts used within contemporary Hinduism, though these punishments should be taken into context with the likewise numerous punishments listed for heterosexual sex also listed within numerous texts used within contemporary Hinduism. These punishments regardless of whether they are aimed are heterosexuality or homosexuality originally was not aimed at the lay people, but these can also be used as models of general behavior. There have been reports of Hindu gurus performing same-sex marriages in India since at least the 1980s.

Hinduism is mostly devoid of the 'perfect law' that can be found in Abrahamic religions (such as the ten commandments) and traditionally Hindus would expect to "rely on reason to decide what is dharma and what is not" 'dharma'. Combined with the lack of centralization and authority, there is great diversity among Hindus as to how homosexual relationships should be institutionalized in Hindu society.

Non-binary marriage

A long-running tradition concerning non-binary marriage exists in Hindu society for third genders, which may also add another perspective as to how homosexual relationships should be viewed in the modern age.

The case for the institutionalization of non-binary marriage is strong in Hindu society due to the strong prevalence of evidence dictating how third gendered marriages were conducted since ancient times.

Institutionalization of unique blessings and rites

"Marriage" comes in several incarnations in Hinduism and several Hindu organizations reject the idea of performing the same ceremonies for both heterosexual and homosexual (and third gendered) couples.

The Australian Council of Hindu Clergy, whose membership includes a significant portion of the Sri Lankan Tamil clergy, lists several types of marriage including those aimed at heterosexual couples and those that are not. It comes to the conclusion that homosexual couples should be provided with their own rites and blessings that are not the same as the rites provided to heterosexual marriage.

Live-in couples (cohabitation)

A large movement exists concerning the provision of live-in rights to partners who have not married. This would provide a centralized instrument to protect partners while allowing Hindu society to decentralize and provide ceremonies and/or blessings according to what each community thinks is right.

The rights currently provided to live-in couples mostly match that of married couples through criminal law, however, there are limitations on adoption, and wording used implies a heterosexual relationship.

== See also ==
- Homosexuality in India
- Kama
- LGBT Rights in India
- LGBT Rights in Sri Lanka
- LGBT topics and the Hare Krishna movement
- Non-westernized concepts of male sexuality
- Buddhism and sexual orientation
