= Aravan Festival in Coimbatore =

Aravan Festival

Aravan Festival
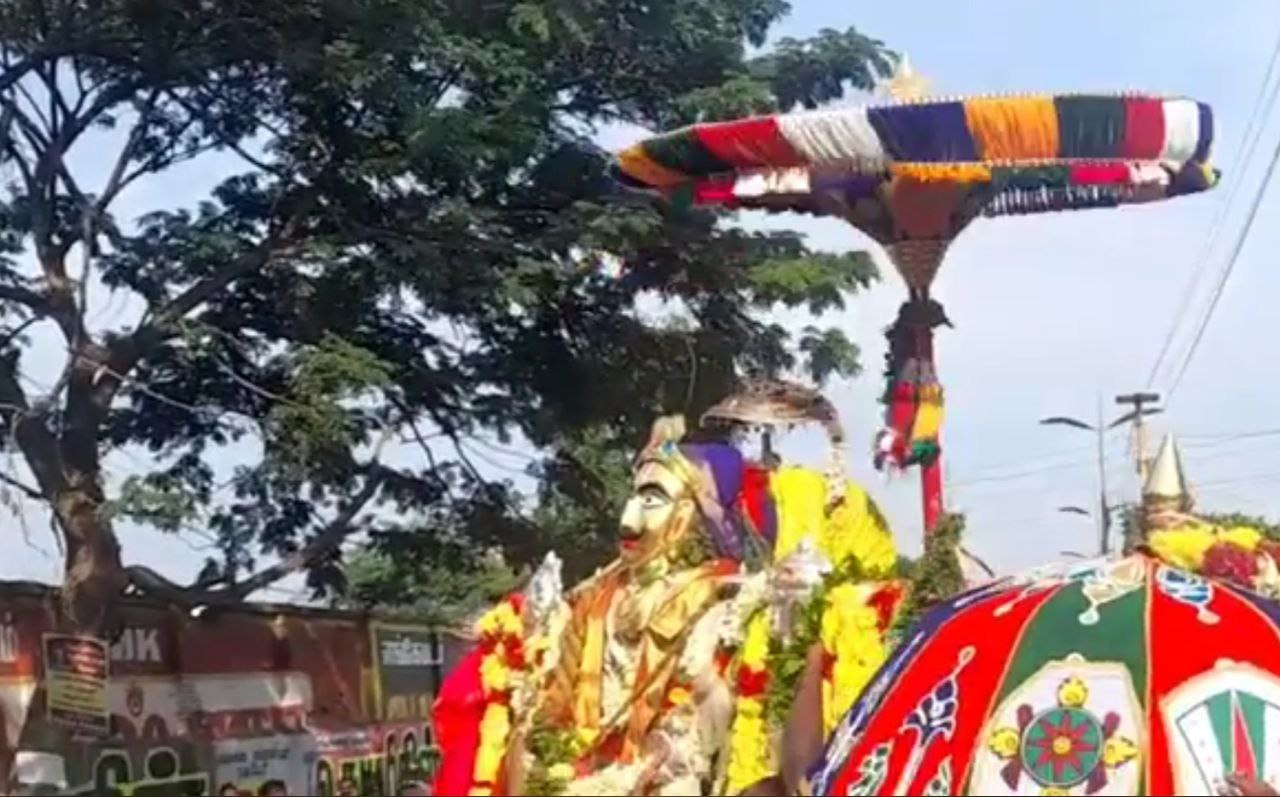
- Aravan Festival
- Official name: Aravan Thirukalyana Thiruvizha
- Also called: Koothandavar Thiruvizha
- Observed by: particularly Tamil people in India,
- Significance: Thirukalyanam festival. Celebrating the marriage festival of Aravan and Pongiyammal 15 days long
- Frequency: Annual
- Related to: Aravan and Pongiyammal

Aravan Festival also known as "Koothandavar Thiruvizha" is festival celebrated in seven places in Coimbatore city such as Vellalore, Thudiyalur, Kurichi, Singanallur, Annur, Vadavalli and Kattampatti since ancient times. It is celebrated for the Aravan, a major character in Hindu epic Mahabarata.

== Legend ==
According to Hindu mythology, the third Pandava prince Arjuna married Naga princess named Ulupi. They gave birth to a prince named Aravan. The prince was raised by his mythological grandfather Indra by hiding the secrets about his father Arjuna. During the time of Mahabharata War, his grandfather Indra revealed the identity about his father to Aravan. Then he decided to participate in the Mahabharata War, in the Pandava side and win the battle. When he visited the battlefield at Kurukshetra, he was welcomed by Duryodhana in the disguise that he is his father Arjuna. In the meanwhile, Krishna gets to understand the spectacular and amazing ability of Aravan to win the war in a single second. Krishna gets promise from Aravan to sacrifice his life in the sake of winning the war considering the massive ability of Aravan and the need of conveying a message to the world by conducting the entire war without any interference. Before the sacrifice ceremony, the Pandava prince Aravan was married to Pongaliammal from Ayothiapattinam. Finally the sacrifice of Aravan was done in the presence and leadership of his mythological grandfather Indra in Kurukshetra.

== Annur Aravan Festival ==
The festival is celebrated in the month of Thai in Annur.

== Kattampatti Aravan Festival ==
The festival is celebrated in the month of Thai in Kattampatti.

== Thudiyalur Aravan Festival ==
The festival is celebrated in the month of Purattasi in Thudiyalur.

== Kurichi Aravan Festival ==
The festival is celebrated in the month of Aiipasi in Kurichi with the share of over fourteen communities.

== Singanallur Aravan Festival ==
The festival is celebrated in the month of Karthigai in Singanallur, Neelikonampalayam and Kallimadai with the share of over eight communities. It is the largest of the seven Aravan festivals in the city. It is held in Aravan and Pongaliamman temples.

== Vellalore Aravan Festival ==
The festival is celebrated in the month of Margazhi in Vellalore along the banks of Noyyal River and in Darmaraja and Pongaliamman temples.

== Vadavalli Aravan Festival ==
The festival is celebrated in the month of Panguni in Vadavalli.
