= Recognition of same-sex unions in Tamil Nadu =

Tamil Nadu does not recognise same-sex marriages or civil unions. However, live-in relationships are not unlawful in Tamil Nadu. The Indian Supreme Court has held that adults have a constitutional right to live together without being married, and that police cannot interfere with consenting adults living together. The Madras High Court upheld this constitutional right in May 2025 in M.A. v. Superintendent of Police, Vellore and Ors. Further, in April 2019 it held that transgender women may marry in Tamil Nadu under the federal Hindu Marriage Act, 1955, and directed the state government to register the marriage of a man and a transgender woman.

== Legal history ==
=== Background ===
Marriage in India is governed under several federal laws. These laws allow for the solemnisation of marriages according to different religions, notably Hinduism, Jainism, Buddhism, Christianity, Islam, Sikhism and Zoroastrianism. Every citizen has the right to choose which law will apply to them based on their community or religion. These laws are the Hindu Marriage Act, 1955, the Indian Christian Marriage Act, 1872, the Muslim Personal Law (Shariat) Application Act, 1937, the Anand Marriage Act, 1909, and the Parsi Marriage and Divorce Act, 1936. The Special Marriage Act, 1954 (SMA; Tamil: சிறப்புத் திருமணச் சட்டம், ௧௯௫௪, Ciṟapput Tirumaṇac Caṭṭam) allows civil marriage officers to solemnize and register marriages for all Indian citizens regardless of the religion of either party. Although the vast majority of marriages in India continue to be solemnized and registered under the traditional religious personal laws, the SMA has become popular among interfaith couples, inter-caste couples, and spouses with no religious beliefs. None of these acts explicitly bans same-sex marriage.

On 14 February 2006, the Supreme Court of India ruled in Smt. Seema v. Ashwani Kumar that the states and union territories are obliged to register all marriages performed under the federal laws. The court's ruling was expected to reduce instances of child marriages, bigamy, domestic violence and unlawful abandonment. The Tamil Nadu Legislative Assembly passed the Tamil Nadu Registration of Marriages Act, 2009, which was signed into law by Governor Surjit Singh Barnala in August 2009, providing for the registration of all marriages performed in Tamil Nadu. It created local sub-registrars of marriages that issue marriage licenses to prospective spouses. The sub-registrar's office may refuse to issue licenses if the parties fail to meet the requirements to marry under the federal marriage laws. The law defines marriage as "all marriages performed by persons belonging to any caste or religion under any law for the time being in force, or as per any custom or usage in any form or manner and also includes remarriage".

Traditional Tamil marriages (திருமணம், tirumaṇam) are deeply rooted in custom and hold significant cultural importance. They involve elaborate pre-wedding preparations and culminate in key rituals, including the tying of the mangala sutra and the saptapadi. Arranged marriage remains the prevailing norm across India, accounting for the vast majority of unions, and often placing pressure on LGBT individuals to marry partners of the opposite sex. Nevertheless, some same-sex couples have participated in traditional marriage ceremonies, although the marriages lack legal status in Tamil Nadu. In September 2022, a Tamil woman, Subiksha Subramani, married her Bangladeshi partner, Tina Das, in a traditional Tamil wedding ceremony in Chennai. The marriage has no legal status in India, but Subramani said, "It was everything we dreamt of but never thought was possible. After years of soldering thorough and braving the taunts we are happy today that our loved ones are standing with us, cheering for us and performing every ritual according to our respective customs." The officiant who performed the ceremony said he had already performed several ceremonies for same-sex couples. A same-sex couple were also married in a traditional Hindu ceremony near Salem in July 2022.

=== Live-in relationships ===
Recognition of same-sex unions in India

Live-in relationships (Tamil: இணைந்து வாழும் உறவு, iṇaintu vāḻum uṟavu, pronounced [ˈiɳaɪ̯n̪t̪ɯ ˈʋaːɻum ˈuraʋɯ], or லிவ்-இன் ரிலேஷன்ஷிப், liv-iṉ rilēṣaṉṣip) are not illegal in Tamil Nadu. The Indian Supreme Court has held that adults have a constitutional right to live together without being married, that police cannot interfere with consenting adults living together, and that live-in relationships are not unlawful. State courts have upheld this constitutional right, and further ruled that if a couple faces threats from family or the community they may request police protection. However, live-in relationships do not confer all the legal rights and benefits of marriage. On 17 November 2023, the Madras High Court urged the state government to accept a "Deed of Familial Association" (குடும்ப இணைப்பு பத்திரம், kuṭumba iṇaippu pattiram)—a legal document in India that allows consenting adults to formalize their relationship and create a "chosen family" unit—as a valid document to recognise the rights of same-sex couples and "enhance the status of persons in such relationships in society".

On 22 May 2025, the Madras High Court ruled in M.A. v. Superintendent of Police, Vellore and Ors that same-sex couples may constitute a family and held that "marriage is not the only foundation for a familial unit". Judges G. R. Swaminathan and V. Lakshminarayanan issued this judgment in a habeas corpus petition filed by a woman seeking the release of her same-sex partner, who had been forcibly detained by her family due to their lesbian relationship. The woman had been forcibly detained, beaten, and subjected to rituals to "make her normal". The court ordered the release of the woman, restrained the family from interfering with the couple's personal liberty, and condemned the police for having failed to properly respond to multiple complaints about the illegal confinement. Citing Navtej Singh Johar v. Union of India and Shakti Vahini v. Union of India, it held that "sexual orientation is a matter of individual choice and falls within the ambit of personal liberty protected under Article 21 of the Constitution." Further, it found that the Supreme Court's decision in Supriyo v. Union of India did not prevent same-sex couples from constituting a family:

While [the] Supriyo case may not have legalised marriage between same-sex couples, they can very well form a family. Marriage is not the sole mode to found a family. The concept of 'chosen family' is now well settled and acknowledged in LGBTQIA+ jurisprudence. The petitioner and the detenue can very well constitute a family.

=== Transgender and intersex issues ===
On 22 April 2019, the Madras High Court ruled in Arunkumar v. The Inspector General of Registration that transgender women may marry under the Hindu Marriage Act. The court ordered the state government to register the marriage of a man and a transgender woman, Shri Arunkumar and Ms. Srija, which had been performed in October 2018 in Thoothukudi in accordance with Hindu custom. The couple were issued a marriage certificate following the court ruling in May 2019. Following their marriage ceremony in October, state officials had refused to certify the marriage and issue a license, arguing that the couple could not marry under the Hindu Marriage Act and that the dictionary definition of bride excluded transgender women. The court ruled that the refusal to register the marriage discriminated on the basis of gender identity in violation of the Supreme Court's ruling in National Legal Services Authority v. Union of India. The court also discussed the story of Aravan in its ruling. The Supreme Court's 2023 ruling in Supriyo v. Union of India held that the Indian Constitution does not require the legalisation of same-sex marriages but affirmed that transgender people may marry opposite-sex partners.

Every year, many Tamil transgender people meet in Koovagam to marry Lord Aravan, known locally as Koothandavar. The participants marry Koothandavar, thus reenacting an ancient story in the Mahabharata: "Aravan, the son of Arjuna and Nāga princess Ulupi, agrees to be sacrificed to goddess Kali so that the Pandavas can win the war against the Kauravas. His dying wish is that he is married. However, no one is willing to marry him since he will be sacrificed the next morning. So Krishna takes on female form as Mohini, weds Aravan – only to be widowed the morning after." Transgender people in Tamil Nadu are referred to as aravāṇi (அரவாணி, pronounced [ˈaɾaʋaːɳi]) in reference to the story. Other characters in the Mahabharata epic changed their gender. For instance, Shikhandi, the sibling of Draupadi, changed gender to male in order to go to war; Arjuna spent the last year of a 13-year-exile as an eunuch named Brihannala; and Krishna as Mohini had a son named Ayyappan with Shiva.

== Public opinion ==
According to a 2019 report titled "Politics and Society Between Elections 2019", published by the Azim Premji Foundation and the Centre for the Study of Developing Societies, Tamil Nadu ranked third in the nation in terms of acceptance of same-sex unions, after Uttar Pradesh and Delhi.

== See also ==
- LGBT rights in Tamil Nadu
- LGBT rights in India
- Recognition of same-sex unions in India
- Supriyo v. Union of India
