= Iravan =

Minor character from the Hindu epic Mahabharata

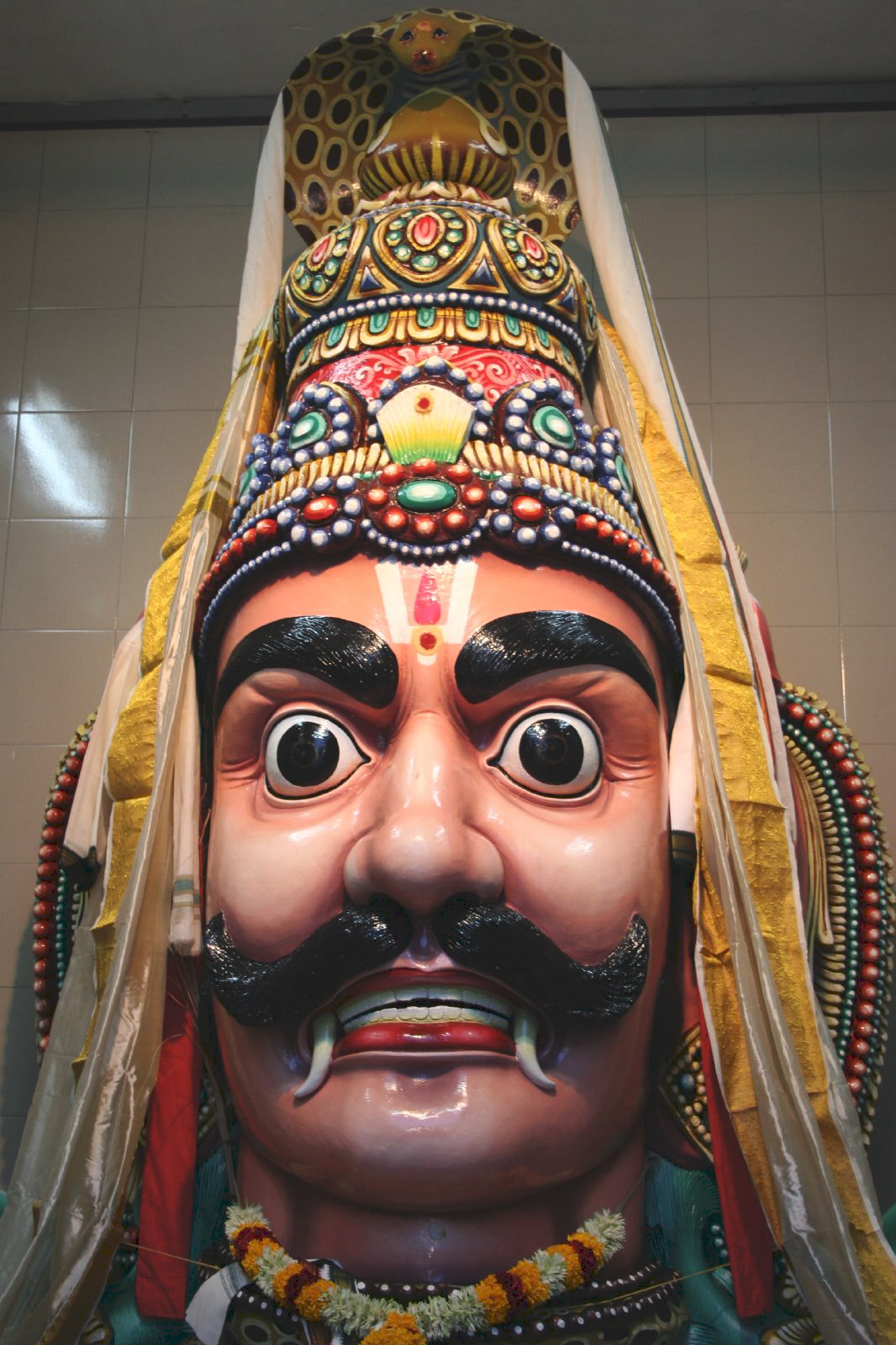
- Aravan worshipped at Sri Mariamman Temple, Singapore. A cobra hood is sheltering Aravan's head.
- Devanagari: इरावान्
- Sanskrit transliteration: Irāvāṇ
- Tamil: அரவான்
- Affiliation: Nāga
- Weapon: Sword, Bow and Arrows
- Parents: Ulupi (mother); Arjuna (father)
- Consort: Paravanacciyal (in Thanjavur folk traditions)

Iravan also known as Iravat and Iravant, is a minor character from the Hindu epic Mahabharata. The son of Pandava prince Arjuna (one of the main heroes of the Mahabharata) and the Naga princess Ulupi, Iravan is the central deity of the cult of Kuttantavar (Kuttandavar) which is also the name commonly given to him in that tradition—and plays a major role in the sect of Draupadi.

The Mahabharata portrays Iravan as dying a heroic death on the 8th day of the 18-day Kurukshetra War, the epic's main subject. However, the South Indian traditions have a supplementary practice of honouring Aravan's self-sacrifice to the goddess Kali to ensure her favour and the victory of the Pandavas in the war. The Kuttantavar tradition focuses on one of the three boons granted to Aravan by the god Krishna in honour of this self-sacrifice. Aravan requested that he be married before his death. Krishna agreed to give his cousin Satyaki's daughter Paravanacciyal in marriage.

The Draupadi tradition emphasises another boon: Krishna allows Aravan to witness the entire duration of the Mahabharata war through the eyes of his severed head. In another 18-day festival, the ceremonial head of Aravan is hoisted on a post to witness the ritual re-enactment of the Mahabharata war. The head of Aravan is a common motif in Draupadi temples. Often it is a portable wooden head; sometimes it even has its own shrine in the temple complex or is placed on the corners of temple roofs as a guardian against spirits. Aravan is worshipped in the form of his severed head and is believed to cure disease and induce pregnancy in childless women.

Iravan is also known in Indonesia (where his name is spelled Irawan). An independent set of traditions have developed around Irawan on the main island of Java where, for example, he loses his association with the Naga. Separate Javanese traditions present a dramatic marriage of Irawan to Titisari, daughter of Krishna, and a death resulting from a case of mistaken identity. These stories are told through the medium of traditional Javanese theatre (Wayang), especially in shadow-puppet plays known as Wayang Kulit.

== Etymology and other names ==
According to the Monier Williams Sanskrit–English Dictionary (1899), the name Iravan (Sanskrit: इरावान्, Irāvān), also spelt Irawan, is formed from the root Iravat (इरावत्, Irāvat), also spelt Irawat. In turn, the root Iravat is derived from Irā (इरा)—closely linked with Iḍā (इडा)—meaning "possessing food", "endowed with provisions" or, by extension, "comfortable" (as used in the Mahabharata and the Rig and Atharva vedic scriptures). Alf Hiltebeitel, George Washington University professor of religion, suggests that the Sanskrit name Iravan or Iravant is derived from Iḍā-vant, "one who possessed Iḍā". The French Indologist Madeleine Biardeau describes religious use of the word Iḍā as reference to an "oblatory substance consumed by the participants from which comes all fecundity of the sacrifice". Based on this definition, Biardeau concludes that Iravant means sacrificial victim in the Mahabharata. Iḍā is also used elsewhere to denote a substance that Devas (gods) and Asuras (demons) vie for.

Iravan is generally known as Aravan (அரவான், Aravāṇ), also spelt as Aravaan in South India. He is revered as a deity in two southern Indian Hindu cults: the Kuttantavar cult (dedicated solely to Aravan), and the cult of Draupadi (Aravan's stepmother and Arjuna's wife). In his own cult, Aravan is also known as Kuttantavar (கூத்தாண்டவர்), originating from the legend of Kuttantavar killing the demon Kuttacuran. This name is sometimes spelled as Kuttandar, Khoothandavar or Koothandavar.

The South Indian, Tamil name, Aravan, is popularly believed to be derived from the word aravam (அரவம்) (snake). Aravan's association with snakes is also apparent in his iconography.

== Iconography ==
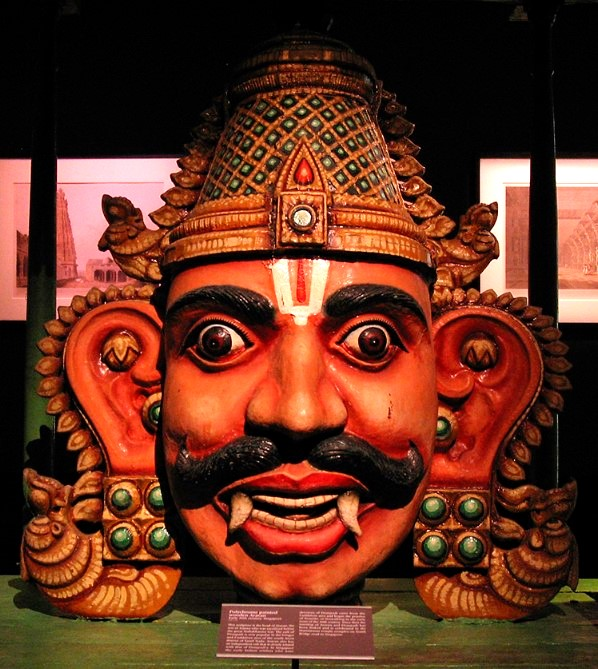
Iravan's head, Asian Civilizations Museum, Singapore

Aravan is always worshipped in temples in the form of his severed head. He is usually depicted with a moustache, pronounced eyes and large ears. Typically, he also wears a conical crown, a Vaishnava tilak mark on his forehead and earrings. Aravan is often depicted with a cobra hood over his crown, cobra heads sprouting through the crown, or a snake emerging from behind the crown. Even the chief Koovagam icon features a serpent on Aravan's crown asserting his mother Ulupi's naga lineage.

Another distinctive feature of Aravan's iconography is the presence of demonic canine teeth. Although the central Koovagam icon does not feature such demonic teeth, they are a regular feature of most Draupadi cult images, where Aravan's demonic features are emphasised.

Aravan-head icons are either painted or unpainted portable ones for processions; they are housed together in the temples of his shrines. Koovagam, Kothadai, Kothattai and Pillaiyarkuppam have icons painted with a red face and multi-coloured ornamentation. Unpainted black stone images of the Aravan-head are seen in Kothattai, Madhukarai and Pillaiyarkuppam.

Some paintings also depict the sacrifice of Aravan. In these scenes, he is often depicted bowing to Kali, while his head is about to be severed; or, as in one Sowcarpet painting, a self-decapitated Aravan holds both a sword and his own severed head, offering the latter to the goddess.

== Historical development ==
Iravan first appears as a minor character in the Mahabharata as the son of Arjuna, the chief hero of the epic. The background to the Mahabharata infers a date that is "after the very early Vedic period" and before "the first Indian 'empire' was to rise in the third century B.C.", so "somewhere in the eighth or ninth century". It is generally agreed, however, that "Unlike the Vedas, which have to be preserved letter-perfect, the epic was a popular work whose reciters would inevitably conform to changes in language and style." The earliest surviving components of this dynamic text are believed to be no older than the earliest external references to the epic, which may include an allusion in Panini's 4th-century grammar manual Ashtadhyayi (4:2:56). It is estimated that the Sanskrit text probably reached something of a "final form" by the early Gupta period (about the 4th century CE). The editor of the first great critical edition of the Mahabharata commented: "It is useless to think of reconstructing a fluid text in a literally original shape, on the basis of an archetype and a stemma codicum. What then is possible? Our objective can only be to reconstruct the oldest form of the text which it is possible to reach on the basis of the manuscript material available."

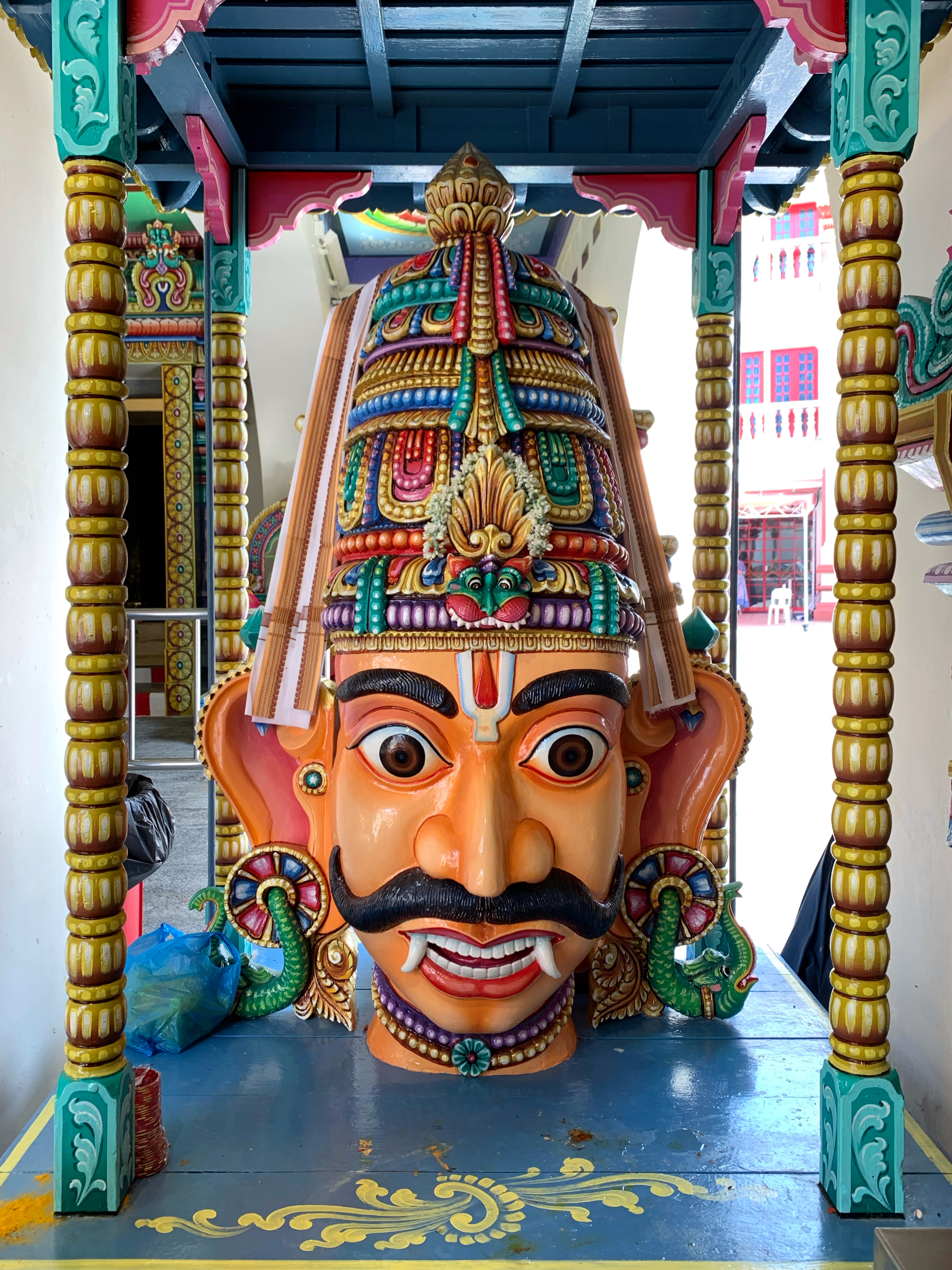
A portable wooden Aravan head in Sri Mariamman Temple, Singapore

Iravan is also mentioned, as the son of Arjuna and Ulupi, in passing references in two Puranas ("sacred texts") known as the Vishnu Purana (4:20:12)—also with a text history from the late Vedic through the Gupta periods—and the Bhagavata Purana (9:22:32)—traditionally dated to the Vedic period but dated by modern scholars to the 9th or 10th century CE.

Although the original Sanskrit version of the Mahabharata records Iravan's (Sanskrit name) death during the 18-day Mahabharata war, the Tamil versions discuss Aravan's (Tamil name) ritual self-sacrifice to Kali before the war. Hiltebeitel relates this to the South Indian glorification of "heroic" self-mutilation and self-decapitation before a goddess. He takes particular note of a scene towards the end of a puranic text, Devi Mahatmyam, in interpreting old Tamil sculptures depicting a warrior king spilling his own blood, as in the Purana, in adoration of a goddess of victory. In the Tamil sculptures, the goddess is Korravai, who became associated with Durga and hence Kali. He also finds parallels in the Telugu legend of the sacrifice of Barbarika—another Mahabharata character—and its variants in Rajasthan (see also: Khatushyamji), Himachal Pradesh, Garhwal, Kurukshetra, Bundelkhand and Orissa. Most notable among the similarities between Aravan and Barbarika is the boon to witness the entire duration of the Mahabharata war—through the eyes of the severed head, despite the sacrifice.

The first account of Aravan's sacrifice is found in Parata Venpa—the earliest surviving Tamil version of the Mahabharata—by Peruntevanar (9th century). The tale is later retold by Villiputuralvar in his 14th-century Makaparatam and by Nallapillai in the 18th century. The legend is also mentioned in the text Khoothanvar Sthala Purana, associated with the shrine of Kuttantavar.

Another source of Aravan traditions is the folk-theatre of Tamil Nadu, called koothu. Aravan Kalappali (or Aravan Kalabali), "Aravan's Battlefield Sacrifice", is a popular theme of the traditional Terukuttu ("street theatre"). Aravan Kalappali tells the story of Aravan's pre-battle self-sacrifice to the goddess Kali to win her support, guaranteeing victory for the Pandavas (Arjuna and his brothers) in the Mahabharata war. Aravan Kalappali is staged annually in the villages of Melattur, Kodukizhi and Yervadi, according to various forms of the koothu folk-theatre. In Karambai, Aravan Kalappali is performed as part of the cult of Draupadi, on the 18th day of an annual festival (April–May), to please the goddess.

In modern interpretations, Aravan's head symbolises not only self-sacrifice but also regeneration and continuity, because of his ability to see the war after his sacrifice. For example, Iramacamippulavar's Merkolvilakka Kkatai Akaravaricai (1963)—which narrates the tale of Aravan—ends with the conclusion that Aravan continues to live on as a folk hero in Tamil Nadu, because he embodies "the ideal of self-sacrifice". Aravan is considered to be a representation of the cost of war; he evokes the "countless innocent" reluctantly sent by their mothers "to be consumed by the insatiable Goddess of War". Indologist David Shulman, on the other hand, considers Aravan's sacrifice to be a reworking of the serpent sacrifice in the Tamil epic tradition.

== Mahabharata ==
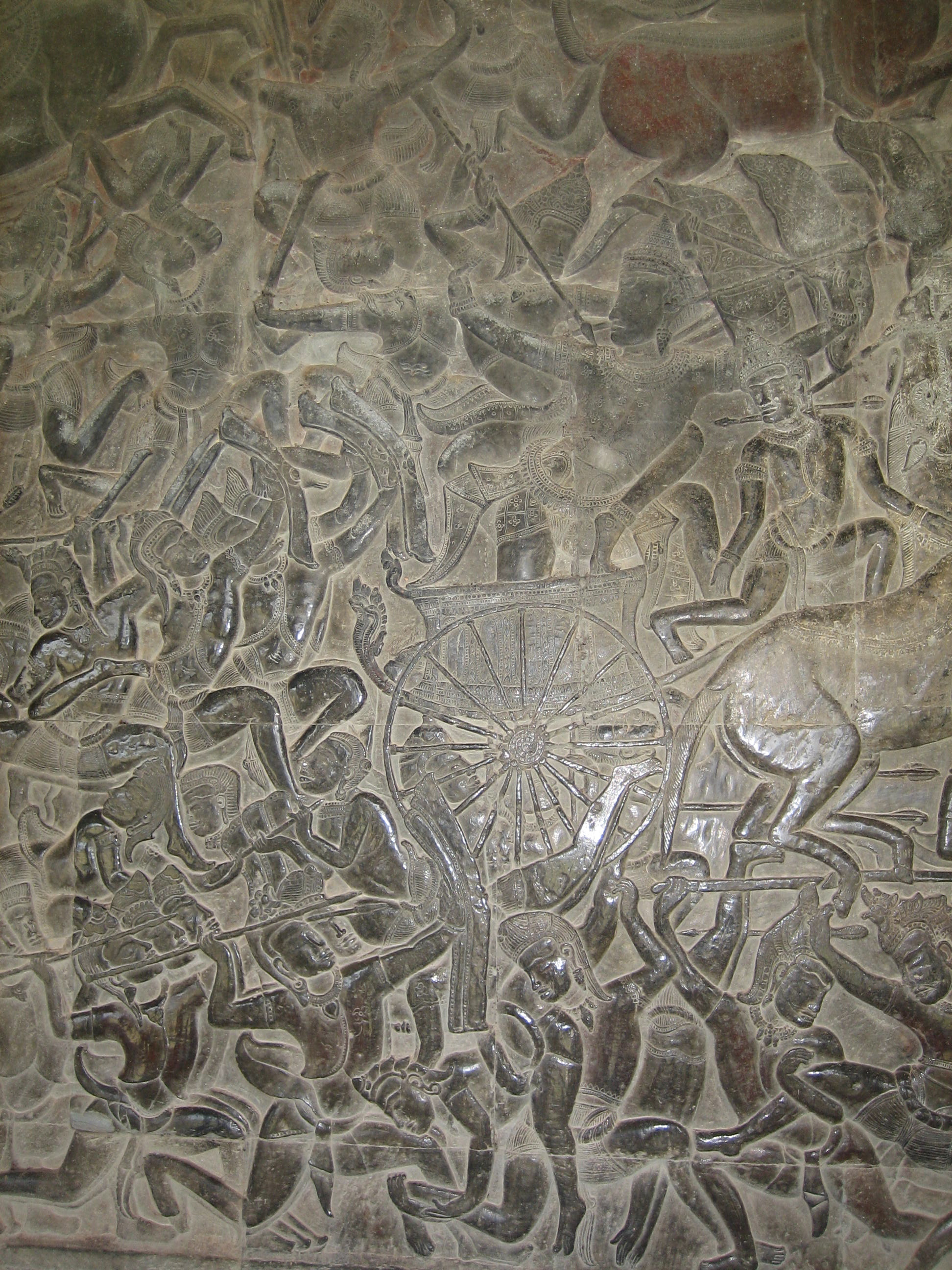
A scene from the Mahabharata war, Angkor Wat relief

While the marriage of Iravan's parents is mentioned in the first book of the Mahabharata, Adi Parva (the Book of Beginnings), both the birth and death of Iravan are mentioned later, in the sixth book, Bhishma Parva (the Book of Bhishma). In this sixth book of the epic, Arjuna, the third Pandava brother, is exiled from Indraprastha (the capital city of the Pandava kingdom) to go on a 12-year pilgrimage as a penance for violating the terms of his marriage to Draupadi, the Pandava brothers' common wife. Arjuna reaches the north-east region of present-day India and falls in love with Ulupi, a widowed Naga princess. The two get married and have a son named Iravan; later, Arjuna proceeds with his pilgrimage, leaving Iravan and Ulupi behind in Nagaloka, the abode of the Nagas. Iravan is described as being born parakshetre, literally "in a region belonging to another person", interpreted by Hiltebeitel as "upon the wife of another". Iravan grew up in Nagaloka, protected by his mother, but was rejected by his maternal uncle because of the latter's hatred of Arjuna. After reaching maturity, Iravan, hoping to be reunited with his father, departs for Indraloka, the abode of the god Indra, who is also Arjuna's father. Upon meeting his adult son, Arjuna requests his assistance in the Kurukshetra War.

Thus Iravan finally reaches the battlefield of Kurukshetra to assist his father and Pandavas against their cousins and opponents, the Kauravas and slays many enemy warriors. On the first day of war, Iravan fights a duel with Srutayush, a Kshatriya king who had been a daitya (demon) called Krodhavasa in a prior incarnation. Srutayush is later killed by Arjuna. On the seventh day of war, Iravan also defeats Vinda and Anuvinda, the princes of Avanti, who are later killed by Arjuna.

On the eighth day of the war, Iravan combats the princes of Gandhara, sons of king Suvala, and the younger brothers of Shakuni, the treacherous maternal uncle of the Kauravas. The brothers Gaya, Gavaksha, Vrishava, Charmavat, Arjava, and Suka attack Iravan, supported by the whole Kaurava army, but Iravan's army of Nagas slay all the soldiers, leaving the Gandhara princes for Iravan. Iravan, then gets down from his chariot and slays five of the Gandhara princes in a sword fight; Vrishava alone escapes death.

Agitated by this reversal, the eldest Kaurava, Duryodhana, orders the rakshasa (giant) Alamvusha (or Alambusha), son of Rishyasringa, to kill Iravan. This time Alambusha, as well as Iravan, uses illusion in combat. Alambusha attacks Iravan with a bow, but Iravan counters, breaking Alambusha's bow and slicing the giant into several pieces. Alambusha's body, however, reconstitutes itself. Then Iravan assumes the form of the serpent Shesha (Ananta), and his serpent army surrounds him to protect him. Alambusha counters this by assuming the form of Garuda (the eagle-man), the eternal foe of the serpents, and devours the serpent army. Ultimately, Alambusha catches Iravan by surprise and kills him by cutting off his head, though Iravan is later avenged when Ghatotkacha, his cousin, finally kills Alambusha during the night war on the fourteenth day and restrucess him.

== Tamil traditions ==
=== Selection as sacrificial victim ===
The earliest source of Tamil traditions regarding Aravan is found in Peruntevanar's Parata Venpa, a 9th-century Tamil version of the Mahabharata. One of the features of this work is its reference to a rite it calls kalappali ("sacrifice to the battlefield"), a term found only in Tamil versions of the Mahabharata. This is a ritual performed before battle to ensure victory. In Peruntevanar's narrative, just before the Mahabharata war, Duryodhana—the leader of the Kauravas and opponent of the Pandavas—learns from the Pandava's expert astrologer, Sahadeva, that the day of the new moon, indeed the very next day, would be the most auspicious time for a kalappali. Consequently, Duryodhana approaches and convinces Aravan to be the sacrificial victim for the kalappali.

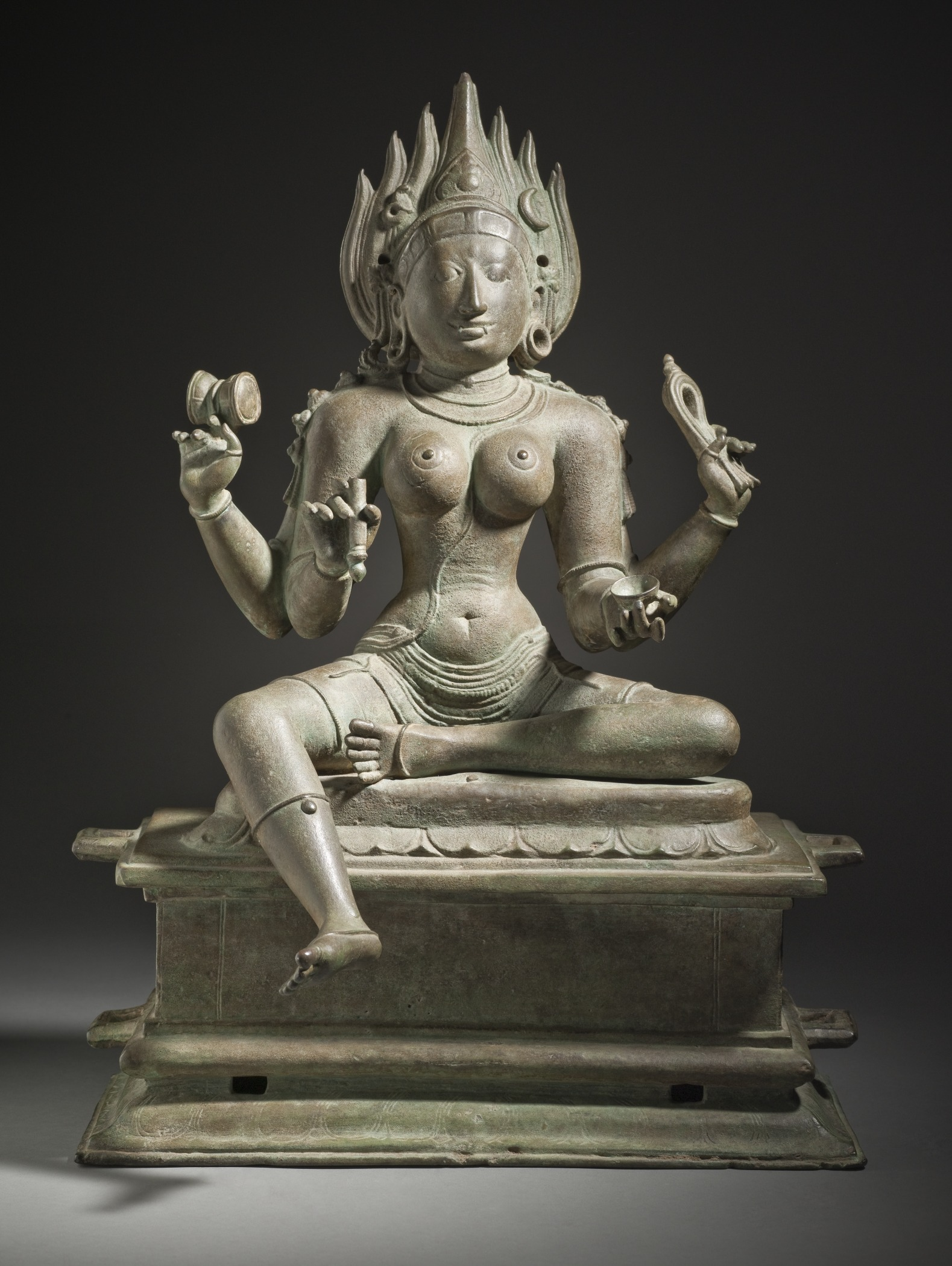
Aravan's ritual self-sacrifice was offered to the goddess Kali (pictured), to ensure her favour and victory in war for his father, Arjuna, and uncles—the Pandavas.

The god Krishna, who is a close friend of and advisor to the Pandavas, hears of Duryodhana's plan, and devises one of his own, to ensure that Aravan will give himself as a sacrifice on behalf of the Pandavas rather than the Kauravas. Krishna first discusses the issue with Yudhishthira (Dharma or Dharmaraja), the eldest of the Pandavas, recommending the sacrifice to Kali as a part of an ayudha-puja ("worship of the weapons"). Krishna establishes that there are four candidates most suited to being offered as the victim: Shalya, who is on the side of Kauravas; Arjuna, the commander of the Pandavas; Aravan; and Krishna himself. From this shortlist, Krishna finally narrows the best choice down to Aravan. Aravan agrees to undergo the kalappali on behalf of the Pandavas but mentions his prior commitment to Duryodhana.

Later Tamil sources provide variants to Peruntevanar's version. In Villiputuralvar's 14th-century version, Krishna first offers himself as the sacrificial victim, but Aravan volunteers to replace him. There is no mention of Duryodhana in this version of the legend. In other accounts, Aravan is sacrificed in order to counteract the Kauravas' sacrifice of a white elephant. In the traditions of the village of Neppattur, in the Thanjavur district, Aravan is described as being so strong that he could slay all the Duryodhanas at once, thus preventing any war from happening. So Krishna prescribes the human sacrifice of Aravan in order that "the greater sacrifice of the war can take place".

In terukkuttu performances, at the time of Aravan's sacrifice, he is often compared to Puru and Bhishma, characters in the Mahabharata who gave up their youth and sexual fulfilment for the sake of their respective fathers, Yayati and Santanu. In the drama, after acquiring Aravan's approval, Krishna approaches Aravan's mother, Ulupi—Nagakanni or Nakakanni ("Serpent maiden") in Tamil, for her consent. At first she strongly opposes her son's proposed sacrifice but finally relents when Aravan appeals to her, explaining that he belongs to Kali alone.

Finally, in all versions of the tale, Krishna tricks the gods Surya (the Sun) and Chandra (the Moon) to co-ordinate their movements so that the day of the new moon will fall one day earlier—the current day. This allows Aravan to make the initial sacrifice of flesh on behalf of the Pandavas, only making the rest-offering on behalf of Duryodhana the following day, yet fulfilling his promise to Duryodhana by doing so.

=== Three boons ===
In Parata Venpa, Aravan asks Krishna to grant him the boon of a heroic death on the battlefield at the hands of a great hero. Although Parata Venpa mentions only one boon, the overall Tamil tradition preserves a total of three distinct boons associated with Aravan. The single boon of Parata Venpa, according to Hiltebeitel, indicates an early (9th-century) effort to harmonise the Tamil tradition of Aravan's pre-battle sacrifice with the original Sanskrit account of his death during the battle at the hands of Alambusha (Alampucan in Tamil).

In both the Kuttantavar and Draupadi cults, Aravan is believed to have been granted a second boon—to see the entire 18-day war. A second boon is indeed found in Villiputuralvar's 14th-century version of the Mahabharata. In this version, Aravan is granted boons of watching the battle for a "few days" and of dying gloriously after killing many enemies, though Villiputuralvar does not actually specify whether Aravan's head survives to see the complete battle after his bodily death on the eighth day.

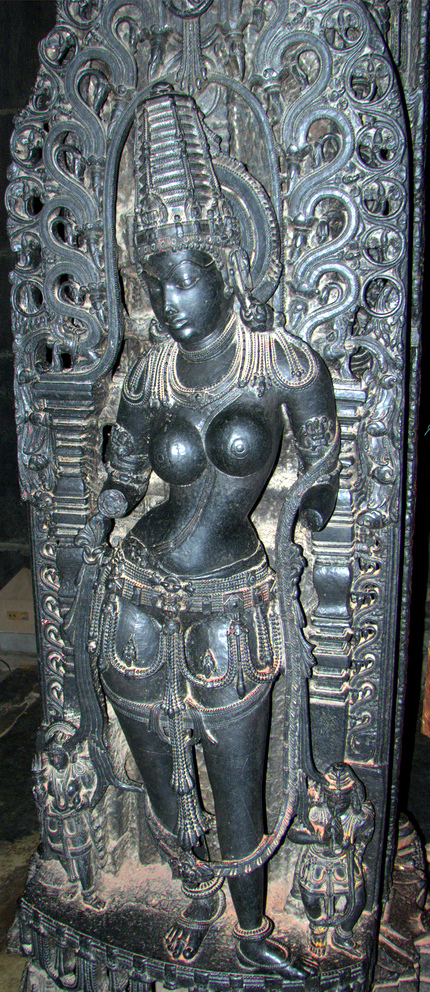
In folk tradition, Krishna is believed to have assumed the form of Mohini (pictured) and married Aravan.

The third boon is found only in the folk rituals. This third boon provides for Aravan to be married before the sacrifice, entitling him to the right of cremation and funerary offerings (bachelors were buried). However, no woman wanted to marry Aravan, fearing the inevitable doom of widowhood (see also sati). In the Kuttantavar cult version, Krishna solves this dilemma by marrying Aravan as his female avatar Mohini, and spending that night with him. The Koovagam version additionally relates her mourning as a widow after Aravan's sacrifice the next day, after which he returns to his original masculine form for the duration of the war.

The terukuttu performance presents a stylised wedding ceremony followed by Mohini's abrupt departure, which is taken to signify that the marriage is unconsummated. Another version, popular with trans people, cites the reason behind Aravan's wish to be "coital bliss" and tells explicitly about consummation of the marriage. This third marriage boon is not, however, uniform across all the folk traditions. In other legends, Krishna arranges some other pre-war marriages. In Thanjavur, the marriage of Aravan and Mohini is unknown; instead it depicts Aravan as married to Paravanacciyal, the daughter of Krishna's younger cousin-brother Satyaki.

Hiltebeitel theorises that both the first (heroic-death) and third (marriage) boons originated with the Kuttantavar cult, while the second boon originated with the Draupadi cult. The Kuttantavar cult ritualises both the heroic death and the marriage ceremony—enacted by Alis (officially, "eunuchs" in Tamil Nadu). Whereas, in the Draupadi cult it is the clay head of Aravan, fixed on a posta and witnessing the re-enactment of the 18-day war, that is prominently ritualised. Additionally, Draupadi-cult texts from Thajavur concentrate only on this second boon, omitting the other two.

The pre-battle sacrifice is incompatible with the first and second boons, but the cults have their own explanations. The self-sacrifice prior to the war is incompatible with dying a heroic death during the war and both are incompatible with living to see the full duration of the war. The Kuttantavar cult resolves the first dilemma, holding that Aravan's body reconfigured itself after the sacrifice and that Aravan went on to die a heroic death on the eighth day of the war. The Kuttantavar cult are not overly concerned about the second boon of Aravan's continued observation of the war. On the other hand, the Draupadi cult are not overly concerned about the first boon of the heroic death; they resolve the second dilemma, regarding Aravan's continued observation of the war, holding that Aravan was able to watch the entire war through the eyes of his severed head. A third view harmonises all the boons, holding that Aravan's body reconstituted after the sacrifice; he then fought heroically until being decapitated on the eighth day, observing the remainder of the war through the eyes of his severed head.

In any case, the pre-battle sacrifice is the common element in the Tamil traditions. After Aravan requested and was granted his boons, he was ready for the sacrifice. He proceeds to the Kurukshetra battlefield. While Yudhishthira is worshipping Kali in his "hall of weapons", Aravan removes his epaulettes and chest plate. He then cuts his body into 32 pieces—one cut for each of his 32 bodily perfections—which are offered by Yudhishthira to Kali. In a terukuttu performance, this is depicted by covering the actor playing Aravan with a white cloth from the neck down. It is also believed that Aravan's spirit may possess the actor at this point. Sometimes a chicken is sacrificed on stage in a terukuttu performance to signify the sacrifice. In Villiputuralvar's retelling, an elephant is sacrificed to the goddess, complementing Aravan's own self-sacrifice.

Aravan, after being stripped of his flesh, has only his head and skeleton remaining. Krishna advises him to pray to the Naga, Adi-Shesha, his grandfather, and father of Ulupi. Adi-Shesha coils himself around Aravan, becomes his flesh and restores his body. To fulfil the second boon, Krishna orchestrates the heroic death by making one of the enemy strong enough to defeat the mighty Aravan. Krishna selects Alambusha. Then, depending on the version of the story, Krishna either advises Alambusha to assume the form of Garuda via a heavenly voice, or he sends the true Garuda to assist Alambusha. At the sight of Garuda—his perennial "eagle" adversary—Shesha uncoils in fear, leaving Aravan unprotected and leading ultimately to Alambusha beheading the weakened Aravan.

=== Aravan to Kuttantavar ===
A traditional story local to Koovagam describes how Aravan came to be known as Kuttantavar. After the war, while the Pandavas are boasting about vanquishing the Kauravas, Krishna asks Aravan—the sole witness of the entire war, "who was truly responsible for winning this war?" Aravan replies that he saw two things: Krishna's discus decapitating the enemy, and his conch shell collecting their blood. This reply is understood to give all the credit for the victory to Krishna.

Aravan's opinion enrages the proud and quick-tempered Bhima, whose influence in deciding the outcome of the battle is covered at great length in the Mahabharata. However, before Bhima can wound Aravan, Krishna orders Aravan's head to be dropped in the river Caraparika, where he assumes the form of a child, and is eventually found by the king of Chandragiri, a city on the river bank. The child cries "Kuva Kuva", when picked up by the king, who therefore names the location Kuvakkam (Koovagam). The king also names the child Carapalan ("reed-child").

The tradition goes on to relate that Carapalan grew up, going on to kill the demon Kuttacuran, who had wounded his adopted father in battle. Draupadi—identified in this tradition with the Supreme Goddess—blesses Carapalan with the new name Kuttantavar—the slayer of Kuttacuran—and grants him a temple in Koovagam.

There are variants within this tradition. Some versions give the credit for finding the child to Queen Kirupanci of Chandragiri. Others omit mention of the king of Chandragiri altogether, and omit reference to the Koovagam temple. Instead they focus on the demon Kuttacuran and an apparently impossible boon granted to him that he will be killed by a person having only a head and who was born from water. Vishnu, incarnated as Krishna, informs the gods that Aravan will kill this demon. With this in mind, the head of Aravan is consigned to the river and is transformed into a child called Kuttan ("born from water"), who kills the demon.

== Worship ==
=== Following and temples ===
Hiltebeitel argues that the Kuttantavar cult might represent the original Tamil tradition regarding Aravan, however it is no longer the only tradition that venerates Aravan. The Draupadi cult has developed traditions and rituals of its own.

Most Kuttantavar devotees reside in the Tamil Nadu districts of Cuddalore, Thiruvannamalai, Vellore and Villupuram. Draupadi's devotees have also spread across these districts, as well as into the Kanchipuram (former Chingleput) district. Her temples can also be seen in the Thanjavur district and beyond, to the southern districts of the states of Andhra Pradesh and Karnataka. The temples of Kuttantavar are fewer than the Draupadi temples and are restricted to a belt running from the Cuddalore and Villupuram districts through to Coimbatore. Thirty-two of these temples are particularly prominent; Koovagam is the foremost. The 32 temples are:

- Coimbatore district
  - Singanallur (Cinkanallur, Singanallur-Neelikonampalyam)
  - Kancappalli
  - Kumaramankalam
  - Kurichi
  - Annur
  - Tutiyalur (Thudiyalur)
- Cuddalore District
  - Kotthattai
  - Puvanakiri
  - Tevanampattanam
  - Tiruvetkalam
- Erode district
  - Kalarikiyam
- Salem district
  - Palaiyacuramankalam
  - Panaimatal
  - Pelur
  - Tetavur
- Thiruvannamalai district
  - Cerppapattu
  - Kilvanampati
  - Tevanur
  - Vedanthavadi
  - Viranantal
- Vellore District
  - Colavaram
  - Otukkattur
  - Pulimetu
  - Putur
  - Vellayampati
- Villupuram District
  - Konalur
  - Koovagam (Kuvakkam)
  - Pennaivalam
  - Tailapuram
- Puducherry Union territory
  - Madukarai
  - Pillaiyarkuppam
  - Varichikudy, Karaikal

The severed head of Aravan is a common motif in Draupadi's temples. Often it is a portable wooden head; sometimes this even has its own shrine in the temple complex. Icons of Aravan's head are also often placed on the corners and edges of Draupadi temple roofs. As a pey or bhuta (spirit), Aravan acts as a guardian against other spirits, for the temple itself, and also for the Patukalam ceremony. Patukalam, in the Draupadi cult, is the symbolic ground on which the Mahabharata war is ritually re-enacted. In the taluks of Thajavur, Kumbhakonam and Pattukkotai, Aravan's head is enshrined permanently in a mandapa or within a temple niche. The largest known Aravan head is found at the Hajiyar Teru temple in Kumbhakonam.

Aravanis, take part in the festival by re-enacting the marriage of Aravan and Paravanacciyal. The Aravanis participate in similar Kuttantavar festivals, of smaller scale, in other villages like Tevanampattanam, Tiruvetkalam, Adivarahanattum—5 miles (8 km) north-west of Chidambaram—and Kotthatai (all in Tamil Nadu) and also in Pillaiyarkuppam, in Puducherry. Although local Aravanis have been part of this festival for many years, since the 1960s, a large number of Aravanis have come to the festival from further afield: from throughout Tamil Nadu, from the whole of India, and even from as far away as Singapore.

During the first six days of the Kuttantavar festival, Aravan's head (cami) is "danced" around the streets of Kuvagam, with music and fireworks accompanying it. Each household offers a puja (a kind of devotional ceremony) to Aravan, with lamp-waving, coconut-offerings and other rituals. Traditionally, goats and chickens are sacrificed. On the 13th day, Aravan's "soul" is ritually transferred from his head to a pot, and the head is repainted. On the evening of the 14th day, a 20-foot (6.1 m) high post is erected on a processional chariot. The post will support Aravan's head and body later in the festival.

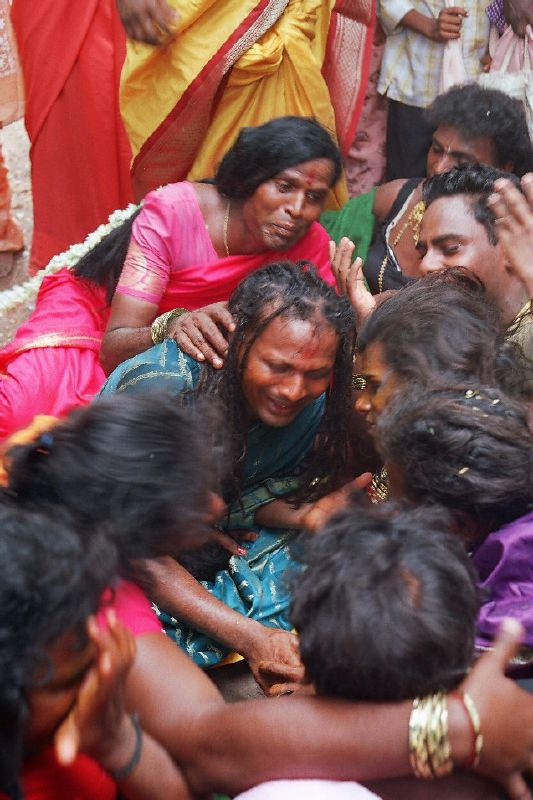
Aravanis—the "brides of Aravan"—mourn his death

Early on the 16th day, the "soul" of Aravan is transferred back to his repainted head and the cuvami tirukkan tirattal ("opening of the god's holy eyes") ceremony is performed with painting of the pupils. The head is then paraded around the village on a portable platform called a ketayam. The ketayam is accompanied by two other platform-chariots, one holding the chest plate and epaulettes of Aravan—without which the festival is considered incomplete; the other carries his flower-crown. The ceremony ends with a sacrificial offering of roosters. Aravan's head is fixed on the post, with his large epaulettes and chest plate fixed to his body, which is made of straw and surrounded by a garland. The image is then paraded across the village in preparation for his kalappali and ritual re-enactment of his death on the eighth day of the war. At noon his chariot turns north, a symbolic gesture representing his kalappali and then he is turned to face the ceremonial Kurukshetra battlefield, symbolising his entry onto the battlefield to die at the hands of Alambusha. On arrival in Kurukshetra, the garlands are removed, indicating the removal of his flesh and his defeat on the eighth day of war.

Returning from the battlefield, the chariot turns towards the location prepared for the ceremonial mourning rituals, the "weeping ground" (alukalam). The "widowed" Aravanis, with their hair dishevelled, lament the death of their "husband" as he performs the kalappali. The garlands from Aravan's image are thrown at devotees one by one, symbolising his gradual loss of vitality. At this "weeping ground", the Aravanis mourn Aravan's death by breaking their bangles, beating their breasts and discarding their bridal finery, like the legendary Paravanacciyal They cut their thalis, which are flung at a post erected for the ceremony (vellikkal). After bathing, they put on white saris as a mark of their widowhood. The Aravanis bear these signs of widowhood for a month before re-adorning themselves with bangles and coloured saris again.

At mid-afternoon, as the chariot reaches alukalam, Aravan is stripped to his skeletal straw body. Most Aravanis have left and wedded to Aravan also break their thalis and bangles and perform all the rites of widowhood (the vellikkal rites) before the image of Aravan. Meanwhile, a paratiyar (Mahabharata-reciter) tells the story of the culmination of the war, symbolic of Aravan fulfilling his wish of seeing the war. Hiltebeitel suggests that while the Aravanis weep for Aravan's kalappali, the villagers weep for the death of an ancestor, as life leaves Aravan's head at the end of the war.

Also at the alukalam, a symbolic sacrifice of cooked "blood rice" is distributed in honour of the deceased Aravan. This rice is believed to make childless women conceive. After the death rites at dusk, the chariot is now considered a "house of death", and the lifeless head is removed from the frame of its skeletal body, then covered by a cloth, and finally paraded around the village as though at a funeral. The head is taken to the temple of Kali, where is it "revived". In a ceremony called vitaiyatti ("the return dance"), the head is once more danced around the village, right up until early morning on the 17th day. On the 18th and final day, the head is decorated and paraded around the village a final time. In the evening, the pujari ("priest") as Yudhishthira (Dharmaraja) crowns Aravan's head in a coronation ceremony held in the inner sanctum of his temple.

In Coimbatore district, Aravan Thiruvizha (The festival of Aravan) is celebrated in seven places in Coimbatore city such as Vellalore, Thudiyalur, Kurichi, Singanallur, Annur, Vadavalli and Kattampatti. The festival at Singanallur, celebrated in the Tamil month of Karthigai, is the largest of the seven festivals. It is termed as "Saathi Nallinakka Thiruvizha" involving the share of over eight communities. The festival is celebrated in the month of Thai in Annur, Thudiyalur in the month of Purattasi, Kurichi in the month of Aiipasi, Kattampatti in the month of Thai and Vadavalli in the month of Panguni.

=== Draupadi cult rituals ===
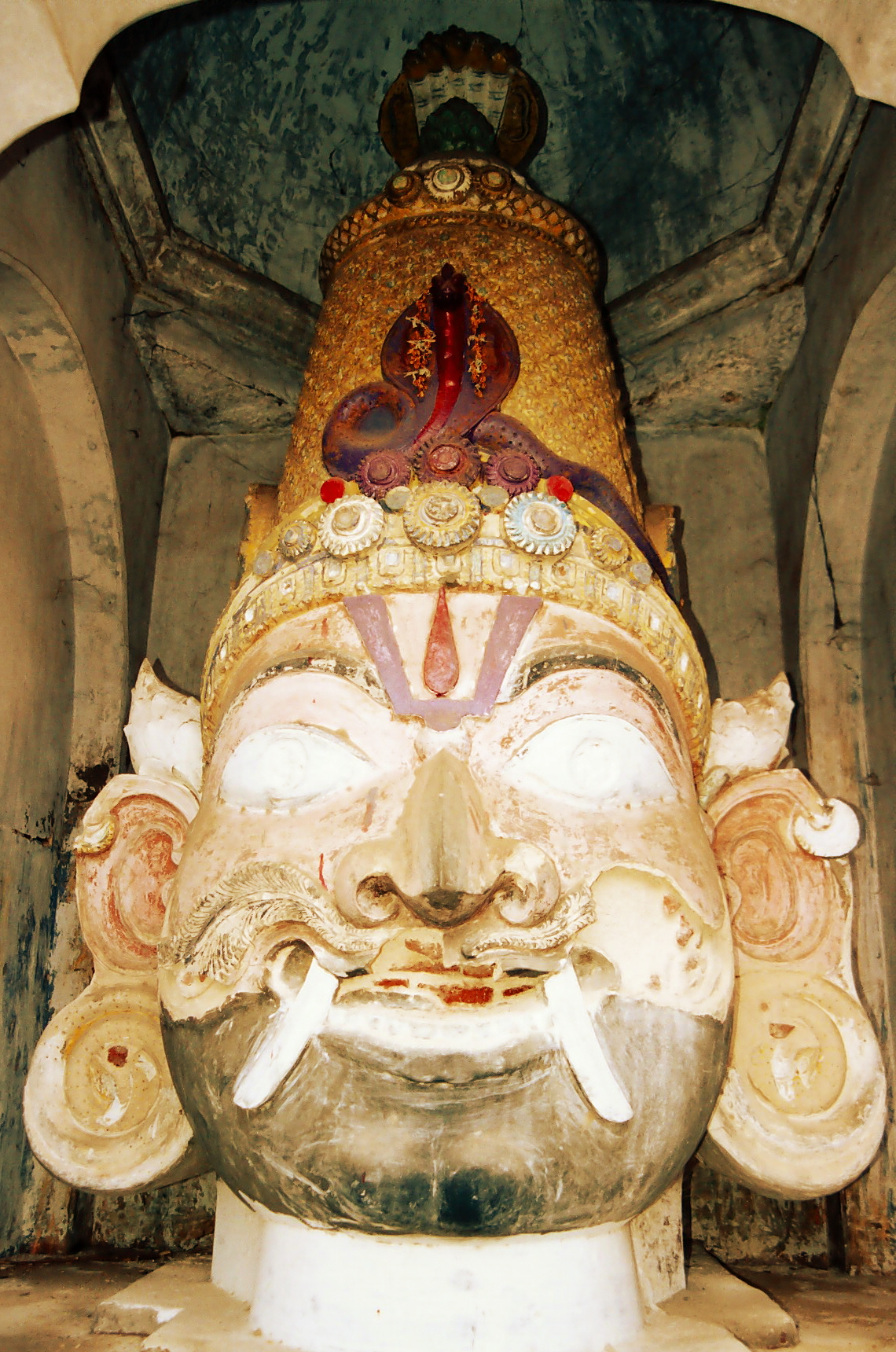
An Aravan head, 13 feet (4.0 m) high, in the Draupadi Amman temple in Ayyampettai. A cobra hood is seen on his crown, while another five-headed cobra is emerging from behind the crown.

Devotees of Draupadi commemorate the Mahabharata war by conducting an annual festival known as patukalam. This festival usually begins with a kuttu ("drama") re-enacting Draupadi's wedding. During the festival, the actor playing the part of Draupadi (and other women participating in the public ceremonies) lament the death of Aravan and the other heroes of the war. There is some variation in the length of the patukalam festival and in the day allocated to performing the kuttu of "Aravan's sacrifice" (kalappali), but wherever the ritual kalappali is performed, that place is declared to be, symbolically, the battlefield of Kurukshetra.

In Irunkal, Tamil Nadu, this kuttu is usually performed 16 days before "patukalam day", the last day of an 18-day festival. In Singapore, however, the kuttu is performed on the day of the new moon in the Tamil month of Purattaci (September–October). In shorter 10- to 12-day festivals, the kuttu and ritualisation of Aravan's kalappali are performed on the concluding night of the festival, as can be observed in Bangalore and in and around Chennai—at Sowcarpet, Alantur and Punamalli.

There is also variation in how Aravan is represented in the festivities. While permanent wooden Aravan heads are used in temples in Chennai and Puducherry, in rural areas the head and body of Aravan are made of clay; both are destroyed at the end of the festival. At Tindivanam, a headless clay and bamboo body of Aravan is modelled, showing him in a heroic position, kneeling on his left knee and holding a bow. A clay head is then ceremoniously fixed, making the effigy about 7 feet (2.1 m) tall. The officiating priest first takes a sword, striking pieces from the head. Then, a pumpkin is sliced into 32 pieces, symbolising 32 pieces of Aravan's sacrificed body. Next, Aravan is fed his own "blood", represented by the blood of goat, sacrificed to Aravan beforehand. Aravan's body from the neck downwards is then covered with a bloodstained white cloth. Finally, blood-soaked rice is sprinkled on Aravan's face. Devotees, as in the Kuttantavar cult, believe eating this rice from Aravan's face, recovered after the ceremony, can induce pregnancy.

In Cattiram Karuppur, near Kumbhakonam, a 25-foot (7.6 m) statue of Aravan is constructed horizontally and placed on the ground. Aravan's story is then re-enacted; one of the actors, believed to be possessed by Kali, kills a rooster over the statue's neck, symbolising the sacrifice. Again, blood-soaked rice is distributed to devotees, especially childless women. Similar rituals associated with a symbolic sacrifice and blood-soaked rice are performed in Melaccari, Alantur, Punamalli and Villupuram. At Alantur and Punamalli, a goat is sacrificed, in Cuddalore, Patirikkuppam and Villupuram, a cock is sacrificed. In the districts of Cuddalore, Thanjavur and Villupuram, Aravan's head is hoisted to an elevated position to watch over the patukalam and the symbolic re-enactment of the Mahabharata war.

== Javanese traditions ==
The Indonesian island of Java, run by the Srivijaya dynasty of Sumatra from the 7th century, practised Hinduism. This included transmission and adoption of the Mahabharata traditions. "The earliest evidence of the penetration of the Sanskrit epics into rural areas is found in the Sangsang copper plate inscription issued in the name of King Balitung in AD 907." A "rendering of the Mahābhārata (IAST original) into Javanese was undertaken under the patronage of King Dharmawangśa Tĕguh (AD 990–1016)", culminating in "a recital of the Wirāṭaparwa for 'one month minus one evening'—commencing on 14 October and ending on 12 November 996." This first translation into Javanese was "abbreviated" and in "prose". However, East Javanese poets later started producing native metered kakawin, expanding on themes from the parvas ("books" or "chapters") of the Mahabharata, and freely importing these into Javanese settings. Petrus Josephus Zoetmulder commented: "These men and women with their Indian names are essentially Javanese, acting like Javanese, thinking like Javanese and living in a Javanese environment."

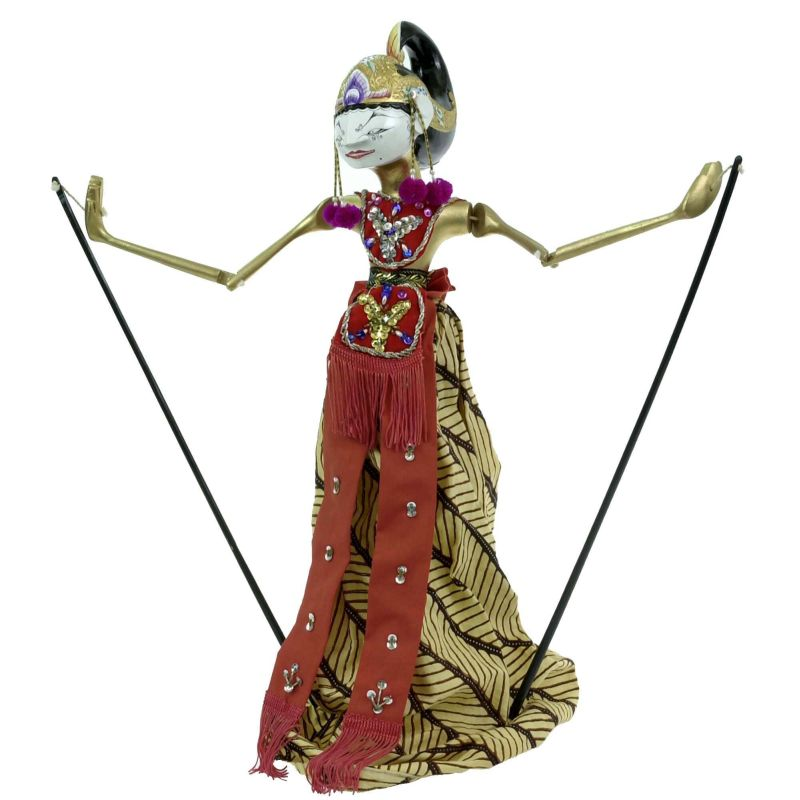
Bambang Irawan wayang golek wooden puppet

The stories of Iravan, usually spelled Irawan in Java, along with others from the Javanese version of the Mahabharata, are told in traditional Javanese theatre (wayang), as well as shadow-puppet plays known as wayang kulit. As in India, Irawan is described as a son of Ardjuna (Arjuna) and Ulupi. While in India, Irawan's mother Ulupi is a Naga (serpent), in Javanese legends she is the daughter of the sage Kanwa (Jayawilapa in puppetry) of the Yasarata hermitage. Irawan is born and brought up in the hermitage under the care of his mother and grandfather, away from his father. Irawan and his stepbrother Abhimanju (Abhimanyu) or Angkawijaya are the protagonists of more than 40 lakons ("scenes", "dramas" or "plays") set in the Amarta Period, the era of the Pandawas (Pandavas). In these lakons, Irawan is depicted as a lijepan character—"a small, extremely refined, controlled character, whose manner is modest". In the wayang kulit, he is referred to as a bambang ("refined knight"), depicted with a white face and dubbed with a light, floating voice. Irawan is also described as determined and calm.

Irawan Rabi

A popular lakon named Irawan Rabi ("Irawan's wedding") tells about the love of Irawan and Titisari, a daughter of Kresna (Krishna). While Titisari is engaged to Irawan, Baladewa (Baladeva), Kresna's brother and an ally of the Kurawas (Kauravas), wants her to marry Lesmana Mandrakumara, the son of Durjudana (Duryodhana), initiating a dramatic conflict. The conflict that ensues ends up being three-sided, among the Pandawas, Kurawas and the ogre-kingdom, whose evil ogre-king Barandjana plans to kidnap Titisari. The confusion that follows results in the outwitting and humiliation of the Kurawas. Siti Sendari, the eldest daughter of Kresna and the estranged wife of Abhimanju, takes advantage of the situation and schemes to bring Irawan and Titisari together, while also mending her relationships with her husband. Though officially Irawan and Titisari are the hero and heroine of the lakon, in reality they are mere spectators, not the movers, in the play. Brandon describes Irawan as a minor character. Irawan is also depicted as unassertive and manipulated by others, which is common in South Asian theatre. Another lakon called Serat Lampahan Pregiwa Pregiwati also relates a tale about the love of Irawan and Titisari.

Serat Gambiranom

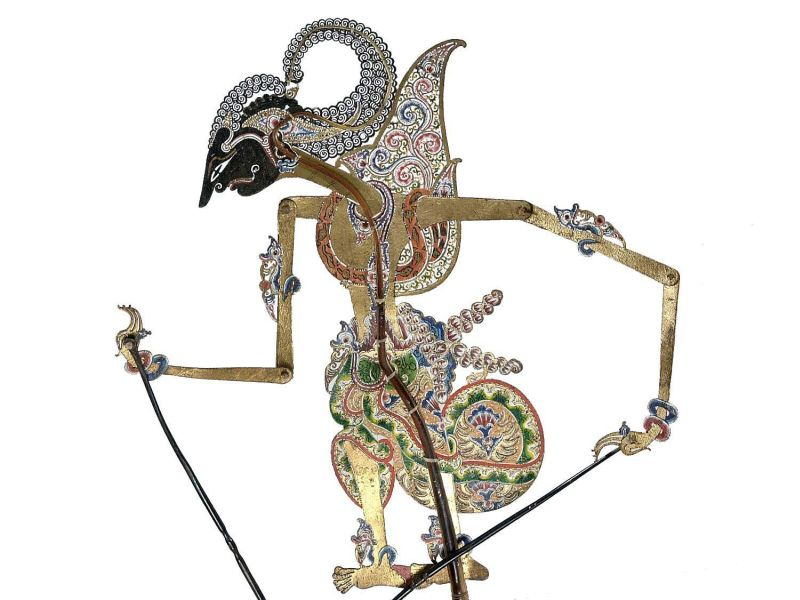
Irawan as Gambiranom wayang kulit shadow puppet

In a lakon called Serat Gambiranom, written in macapat verse by Mangkunegara IV's court poet R. M. Ng. Wiryakusuma in 1883, and embellished by anonymous later poets, Irawan becomes the king of Ngrancang Kencana and earns the title Prabu Gambiranom. Yet another lakon, Irawan Maling, discusses a duel between Irawan and Angkawijaya.

Irawan(an)taka

The kakawin text Irawan(an)taka ("Death of Irawan"), also known as Parthawijaya ("Arjuna's Victory"), describes Irawan's death in the Bharatayuddha (Mahabharata war). At the beginning of the Bharatayuddha, Irawan advances to the battlefield along with his brothers. Together, they kill many Kurawas. Later, the demon (ditya) Kalasrenggi encounters Irawan. Kalasrenggi, whose father was killed by Ardjuna, mistakes Irawan for Ardjuna because of the similarity of their appearance and kills him. Arjuna then kills Kalasrenggi to avenge Irawan's death. The death of Irawan is placed at the very beginning of the war in the Javanese version of the Mahabharata. The puppetry version of the story places this encounter between Irawan and Kalasrenggi even before Irawan's meeting with his father, ahead of the Bharatayuddha.
