= Vasishtha Dharmasutra =

Sanskrit Dharmasutras of Hinduism

The Vashistha Dharmasutra is one of the few surviving ancient Sanskrit Dharmasutras of Hinduism. It is reverentially named after a Rigvedic sage Vashistha who lived in the 2nd millennium BCE, but the text was probably composed by unknown authors between 300 BCE – 100 CE. It forms an independent text and other parts of the Kalpasūtra, that is Shrauta- and Grihya-sutras are missing. It is written in sutra style, and contains 1,038 sutras. According to Patrick Olivelle – a professor of Sanskrit and Indian religions, the text may be dated closer to the start of the common era, possibly the 1st century, since it uses the pronoun "I" and a style as if the text is a personal teaching guide, and because it is the oldest Indian text that mentions "the use of written evidence in judicial proceedings".

Like the dozens of other texts in this genre, the Vashistha Dharmasutra is a treatise on Dharma that discusses duties, responsibilities and ethics to oneself, to family and as a member of society. This Dharmasūtra is likely of a later date than the Gautama and Baudhayana Dharmasutras that have also survived. However, like many Dharmasutras and Dharmasastras of Hinduism, the manuscripts of this text that have survived show evidence of revisions and some very corrupt passages. The chapters of Vashistha Dharmasutra are arranged in the manner of later Smritis.

== Organization and Contents ==
By giving gifts a man obtains all his wishes,
a long life, and rebirth as a handsome vedic student.
A man who refrains from causing injury to living beings goes to heaven.

— Vasistha Dharmasutra 29.1–3

Some of the topics discussed in this Dharmasūtra are sources of law, sins, marriage, governance, social classes, rites of passage (birth, menstruation, marriage, cremation), good conduct, orders of life (ashrama), charity and guests, adoption, excommunication and loss of caste, readmission to caste, mixed classes, crimes, murder, adultery, theft, suicide, killing animals, penances, punishment for minor and major crimes, gifts, and others.

=== On need and sources of law ===
Social classes

Speaking the truth, refraining from anger,
giving gifts, not killing living creatures, and
fathering children – these are common to all classes.

— Vasistha Dharmasutra 4.4

The Vashistha Dharmasutra states that the desire to know Dharma is for the "sake of attaining the highest goal of man", and one who knows it and follows is the righteous one. The text states that the Vedas and the traditional texts are a source of Dharma knowledge, but if these do not offer guidance or conflict, then the practices of "cultured men free from desires and tangible motives" constitute what is right.
