= Kurichi =

Coimbatore Tamil Nadu, India

- Neighbourhood
- Location in Tamil Nadu, India
- Coordinates: 10.96°N 77.01°E
- Country: India
- State: Tamil Nadu
- Region: Kongu Nadu
- District: Coimbatore

Population (2011)
  - Total: 123,667

Languages
  - Official: Tamil
- Time zone: UTC+5:30 (IST)
- Postal code: 641***
- Telephone code: +91-422
- Vehicle registration: TN-99

Kurichi is a neighborhood of Coimbatore city in the Indian state of Tamil Nadu. It was upgraded to a municipality in 2004, it was recently merged with the Coimbatore Corporation. As of 2011, the town had a population of 123,770.

== Geography ==
Kurichi is located at 10.96°N 77.01°E.It shares its borders with Podanur, Sundarapuram, Kuniyamuthur, Nanjundapuram and Ukkadam. It is located to the north of Kurichi Kulam lake in the city.

== Demographics ==
Religious census
Religion	Percent(%)
Hindu	68.97%
Muslim	19.63%
Christian	10.89%
Sikh	0.04%
Buddhist	0.01%
Jain	0.01%
Other	0.44%
No religion	0.01%

According to 2011 census, Kurichi had a population of 123,667 with a sex-ratio of 1,001 females for every 1,000 males, much above the national average of 929. A total of 12,987 were under the age of six, constituting 6,596 males and 6,391 females. Scheduled Castes and Scheduled Tribes accounted for 10.51% and .25% of the population respectively. The average literacy of the town was 80.48%, compared to the national average of 72.99%. The town had a total of 32830 households. There were a total of 49,040 workers, comprising 264 cultivators, 263 main agricultural labourers, 1,060 in house hold industries, 43,232 other workers, 4,221 marginal workers, 61 marginal cultivators, 53 marginal agricultural labourers, 137 marginal workers in household industries and 3,970 other marginal workers.

As per the religious census of 2011, Kurichi had 68.97% Hindus, 19.63% Muslims, 10.89% Christians, 0.04% Sikhs, 0.01% Buddhists, 0.01% Jains, 0.44% following other religions and 0.01% following no religion or did not indicate any religious preference.

== Civic administration ==
Kurichi was upgraded to a municipality in 2004.
