= Vadavalli =

Neighbourhood in Coimbatore, India

- Neighbourhood
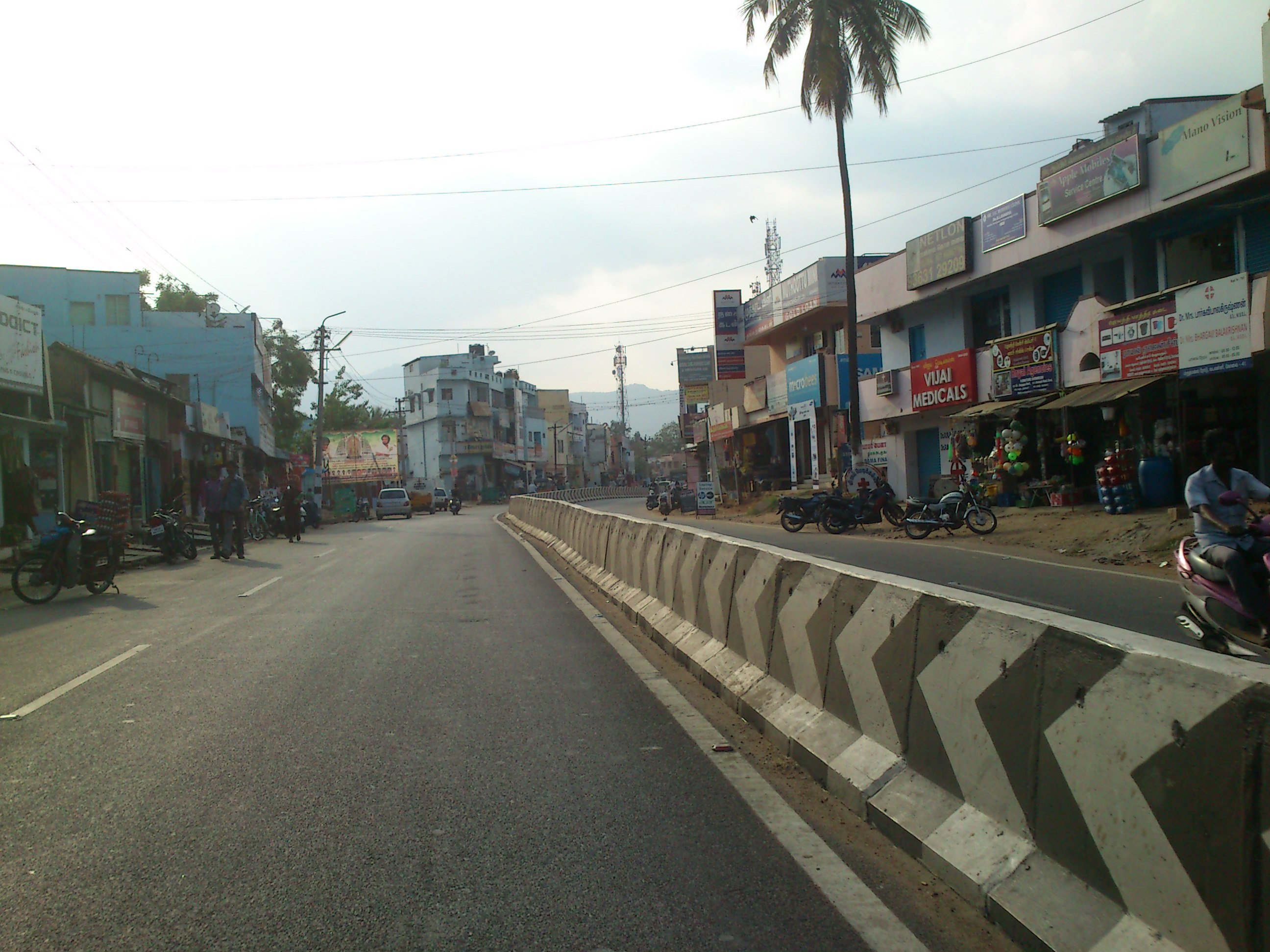
- Marudamalai Road, Mullai Nagar, Vadavalli

- Location in Tamil Nadu, India
- Coordinates: 11.024745°N 76.898036°E
- Country: India
- State: Tamil Nadu
- District: Coimbatore
  - Rank: 1
- Elevation: 450 m (1,480 ft)

Population (2001)
  - Total: 444,700

Languages
  - Official: Tamil
- Time zone: UTC+5:30 (IST)
- PIN: 641041
- Telephone code: 0422
- Vehicle registration: TN-66; TN-38

Vadavalli (Tamil pronunciation: [ʋadavalli]) is a neighbourhood in Coimbatore in the Indian state of Tamil Nadu. It is located on the Marudamalai Road and has been under the jurisdiction of the Coimbatore City Municipal Corporation limits since 2007. It is located at the foothills of the Western Ghats.

== Geography ==
Vadavalli is about 9.1km from Coimbatore Junction railway station, 9.1km from the Gandhipuram bus stand and 19 km from the Coimbatore International Airport. The Siruvani River, which supplies drinking water to most parts of Coimbatore, is about 35 km away. From Vadavalli, there exists a link road to Thondamuthur which leads to the Siruvani Dam.

Traditionally an agricultural community, Vadavalli is now a popular residential precinct. Also, it boasts of a large number of educational institutions in its surroundings, inclusive of both schools and colleges. For instance, the Anna University Regional Campus, Bharathiar University and the Government Law College are located 4 km from Vadavalli. Avila Convent and Kalveeram Palayam Government School are two of the premier schools which are located in and around Vadavalli.

== Demographics ==
According to the 2001 India census, Vadavalli has a population of 444,700. Males and females constitute equal parts of the population - both being 50%. Vadavalli has an average literacy rate of 78%, which is significantly higher than the national average of 59.5% - the male literacy is 83%, and the female literacy is 74%. 9% of the population is under 6 years of age.

In 2011, Vadavalli was recorded as having been incorporated into Coimbatore Corporation limits. Initially, it only consisted of a Special Town Panchayat and Narayanasamy Nagar. It is a sample Smart City and well-planned, well-maintained, clean and tidy.

== Historical locations ==
A famous Lord Muruga temple in Tamil Nadu is located here. Anuvavi Temple, another Lord Murugan temple, is about 15 km away and can be reached via a mountain trail from Marudamalai. It also houses the Vellingiri Hills Lord Shiva site. The 2000-year-old Perur Temple is also close by.

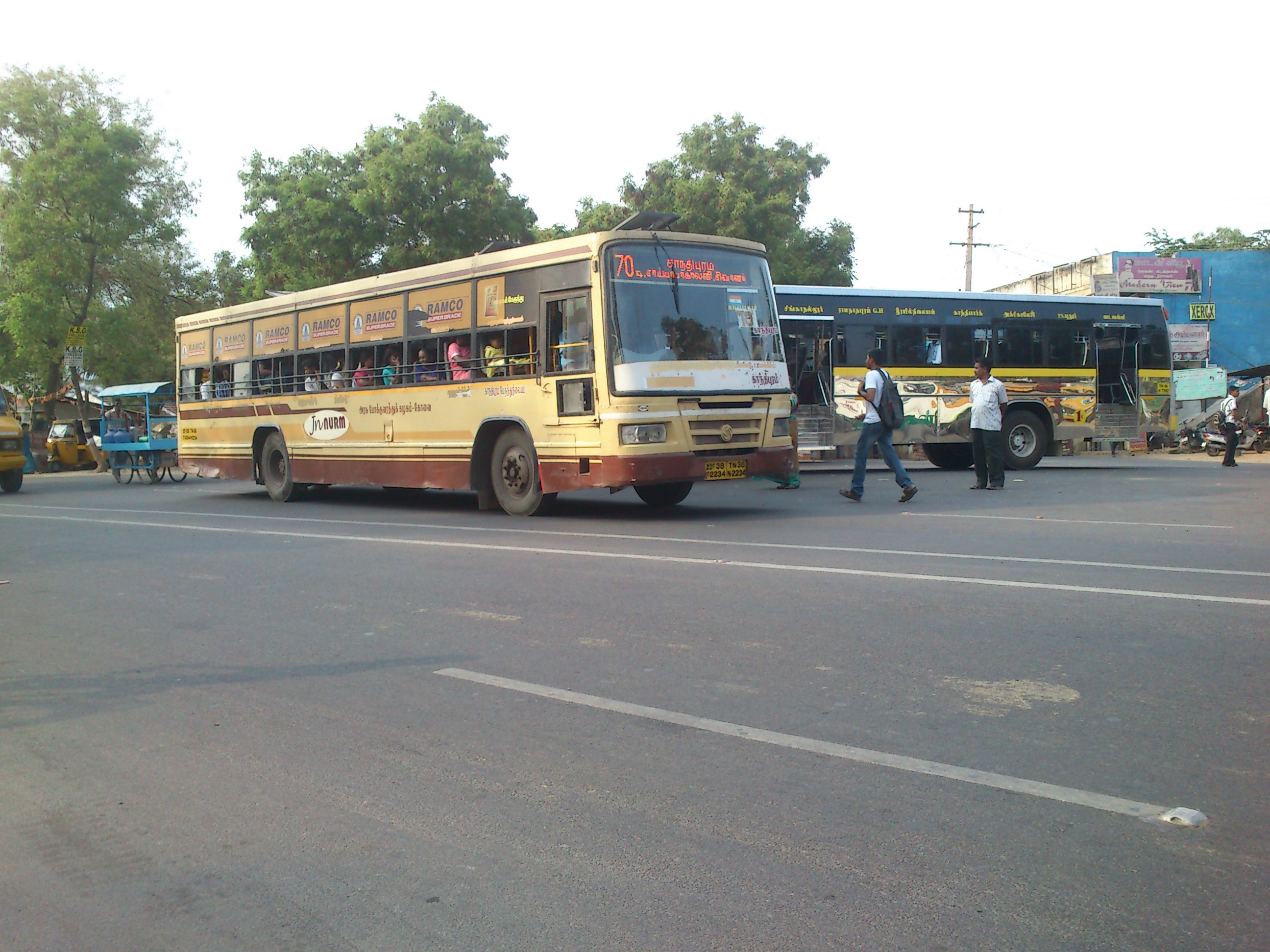
Vadavalli Bus Stand

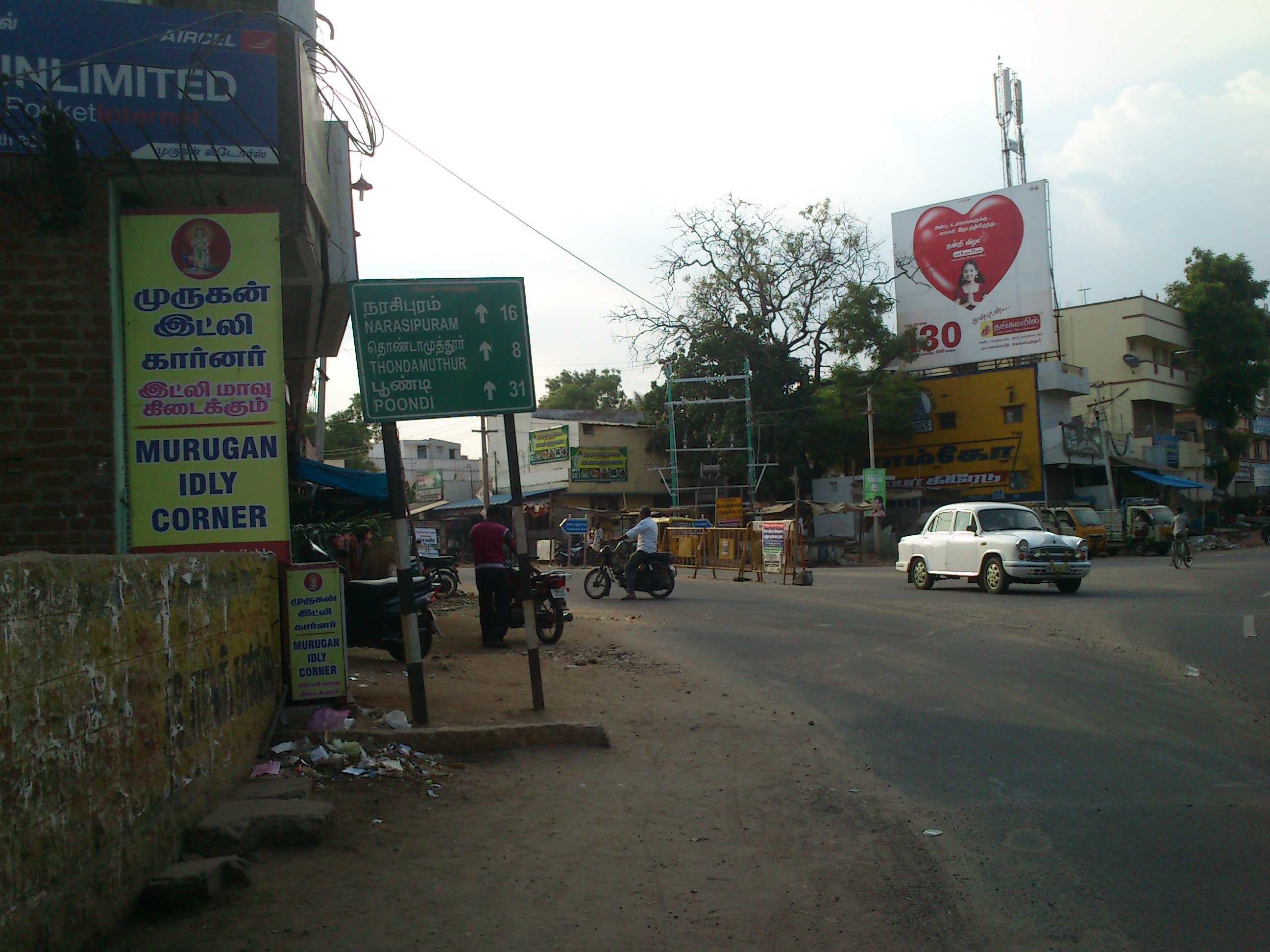
Thondamuthur - Marudamalai Road Junction
