= Koovagam =

- Village
- Location in Tamil Nadu, India Koovagam (India)
- Coordinates: 11°50′11″N 79°20′31″E
- Country: India
- State: Tamil Nadu
- District: Kallakurichi

Government
  - Type: Panchayath

Languages
  - Official: Tamil
- Time zone: UTC+5:30 (IST)
- Postal code: 606102
- Vehicle registration: TN-15

Koovagam (கூவாகம்) is a village in the Ulundurpettai taluk in Kallakurichi district, Tamil Nadu. It is located 25 kilometres (16 mi) from Viluppuram and 15 kilometres (9.3 mi) from Ulundurpet. Koovagam has an annual festival of transgender individuals, which takes place over fifteen days in the Tamil month of Chitrai (April/May).

The festival is held at the Koothandavar Temple, dedicated to Iravan (Koothandavar). The participants marry the Koothandavar, in a reenactment of the mythological marriage of Koothandavar and Vishnu/Krishna, who had taken the form of a woman called Mohini. The next day, the participants mourn the Hindu god Koothandavar's death through ritualistic dances and by breaking their bangles. The festival also includes a beauty pageant and other competitions, as well as discussions of transgender rights.

== Koovagam festival ==
The Koovagam festival is an annual gathering of transgender women (Tamil: Aravani) that begins on the full moon of the Chithirai month of the Tamil calendar. Tens of thousands of transgender women gather for the 18-day-long festival.

For the first 13 days, the festival is filled with performances, programming, and the Miss Koovagam beauty pageant. During the 14th day of the festival, the women dress in their finest attire and arrive at the Koothandavar temple to become symbolic brides of the deity Aravan..

On the 16th day, the image of Aravan is repainted and paraded during the festival throughout the village until the deity reaches the mourning grounds, where the brides become widows and wear white sarees, remove their thaalis and break their bangles to spend a day as widows, mourning the death of Aravan.

At the festival, organizations spread awareness about the high HIV rates within the transgender community in India and run testing centers.

== History and mythology ==
The mythology associated with the celebration of the Koovagam Festival comes from the myth of Aravan, a character of the Mahabharata. The Mahabharata tells the story of the 18-day Kurukshetra War and how Aravan heroically sacrificed himself to help win it. In the myth, Aravan is the son of the Pandava prince Arjuna and the Naga princess Ulupi.

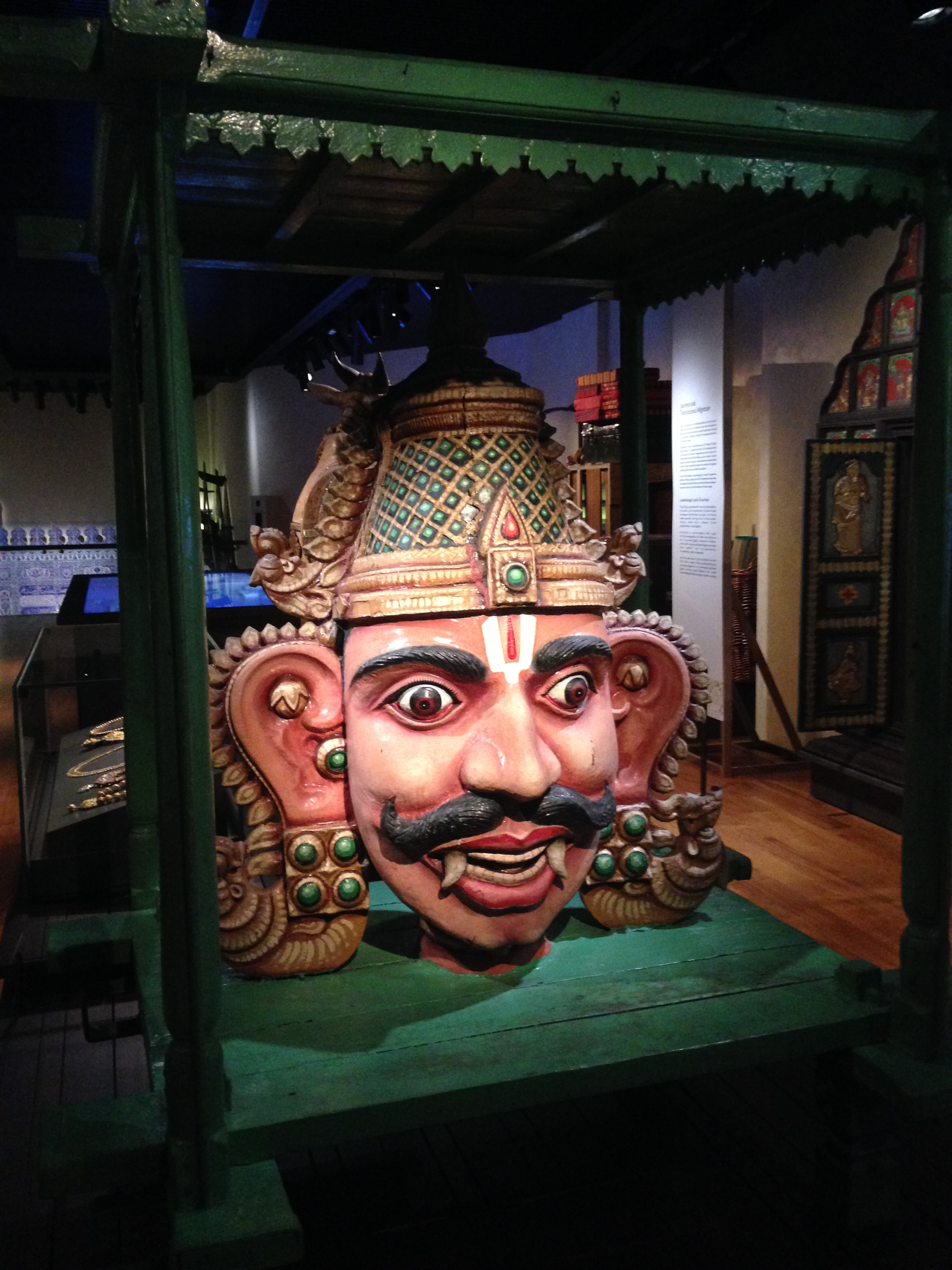
Aravan sculpture

According to the Mahabharata, the Pandavas had to make a human sacrifice known as the Kalappali to win the war. The person sacrificed had to have the 32 lakshanam and the only 3 people to have these were Krishna, Arjuna, and Aravan. Krishna could not be sacrificed and Arjuna was essential as he was the best archer, so Aravan volunteered himself to be the one to die.

== Marriage to Koothandavar and widowhood ==
On the 14th day of the Koovagam festival, which is also the full moon day, transgender women dressed as Mohini gather at the Kuttatavar temple from dawn to marry Aravan. Transgender people who are brides are usually dressed in their finest attire, bangles, and garlands. Various offerings are also carried, including kalasha and thali made of turmeric. In the sanctuary, there are many priests officiating the weddings of the brides, each of whom will marry Aravan. The priests usually act as Aravan's representatives, tying the thali around the bride's neck and performing symbols of marriage in Hinduism. That night and the next day, a transgender lady can have sex to mark the consummation of a marriage.

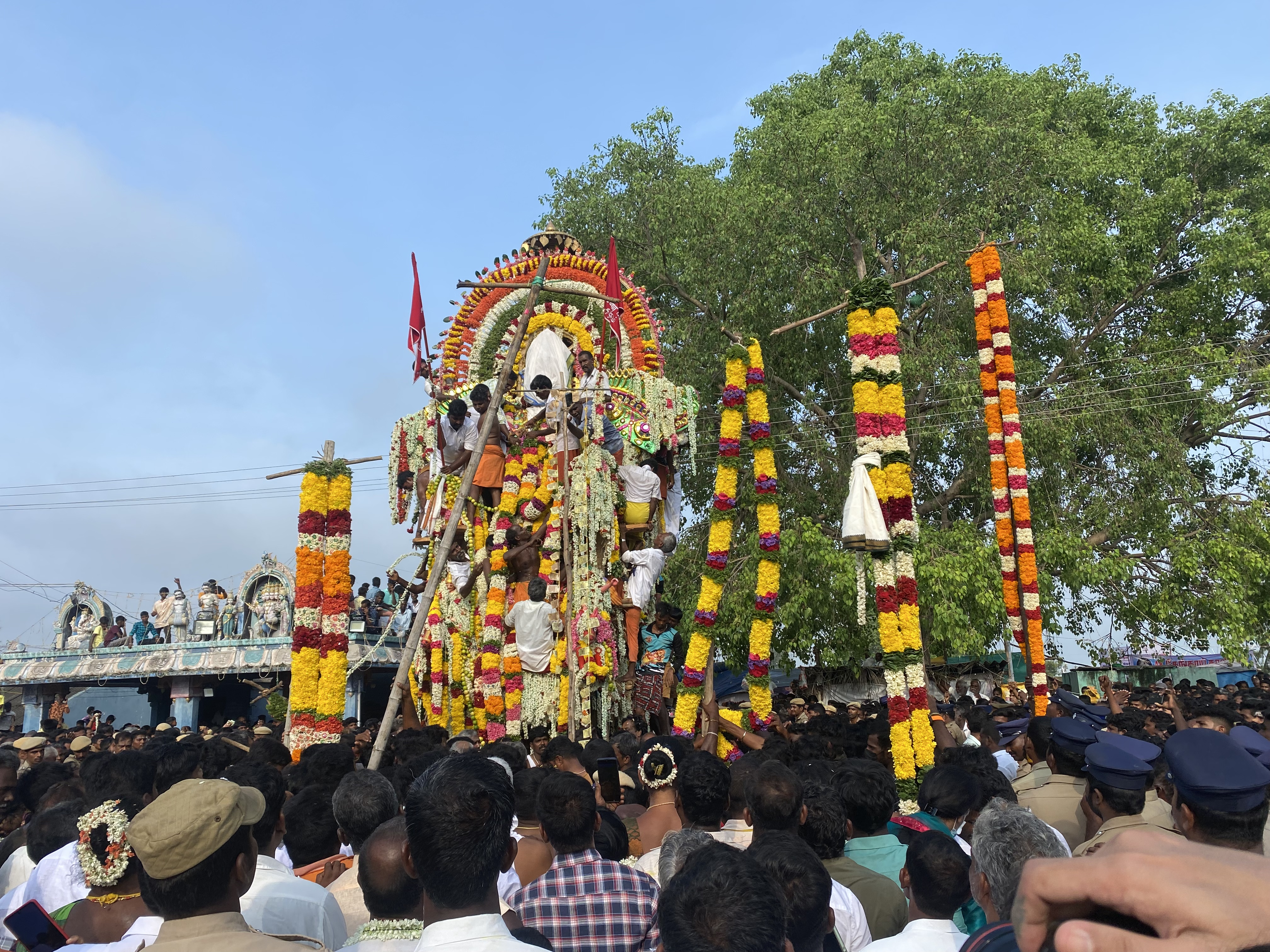
Koovagam Koothandavar idol

On the 16th day, the idol of Aravan was taken out and paraded. Newly married transgender women gather at a place called Azhukalam, which is a designated place of mourning. As the procession proceeds, many of the decorations on Aravan's body, such as flowers, are removed, signifying that Aravan was killed on the battlefield and his flesh and bones are removed. At this point, Aravan's widows collectively remove their thalis, break their bangles, and cry bitterly. Lamenting their widowhood. Their attire is usually white sarees, but the dress code is temporary and transgender widows can still wear bright colors after the ceremony. These transgender women can still return the following year to repeat this wedding ceremony.

== HIV/AIDS and NGOs ==
Transgender people who are kicked out are often forced to resort to jobs such as sex work and bar dancing to support themselves. People participating in this line of work would often become infected with HIV. 2.1 million people are infected with HIV/AIDS and the highest percentage of people infected come from the transgender community. This high percentage comes from the lack of medical care that the transgender community has access to..

A large part of the festival's message is to get rid of the stigma towards the transgender community to then ultimately lower the number of HIV infections. Non-Governmental Organizations (NGOs) are working to help spread this message while also stopping the spread of HIV. One of these organizations is the Tamil Nadu AIDS Initiative which helps stop the spread of HIV through education on safe sex practices. Another organization is Alliance India which provides better healthcare and access to medical supplies to the transgender community.

== Miss Koovagam ==
Miss Koovagam is an annual beauty pageant that occurs during the first 13 days of the Koovagam festival.

Recent winners of the beauty pageant are:

Year	Winner	Ref
2023	K.Niranjana from Chennai	
2022	Mehandi from Chennai	
2018	Mubina from Chennai	
2017	Andrea from Chennai	

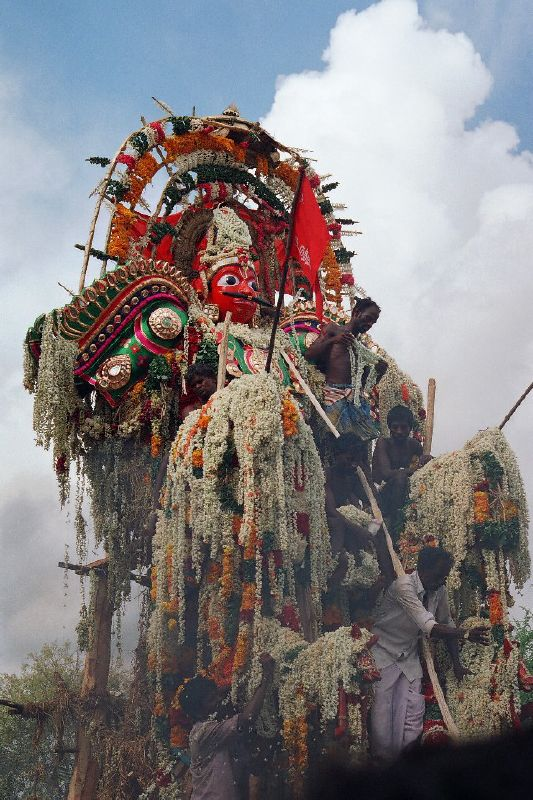
Koothandavar

== See also ==
- Tamil sexual minorities
