= Villapuram =

- Neighbourhood
- Villapuram, Madurai (Tamil Nadu)
- Coordinates: 9°53′42.7″N 78°07′14.9″E
- Country: India
- State: Tamil Nadu
- District: Madurai district
- Elevation: 155 m (509 ft)

Languages
  - Official: Tamil language, English language
  - Speech: Tamil language, English language
- Time zone: UTC+5:30 (IST)
- PIN: 625012
- Telephone Code: 0452xxxxxxx
- Neighbourhoods: Madurai, East Gate, Nelpettai, Simmakkal, Sellur, Goripalayam, Tallakulam, Shenoy Nagar, Yanaikkal, Arappalayam, Ellis Nagar and South Gate
- Corporation: Madurai Municipal Corporation
- LS: Madurai Lok Sabha constituency
- VS: Madurai South Assembly constituency
- MP: S. Venkatesan
- MLA: M. Boominathan
- Website: https://madurai.nic.in

Villapuram is a neighbourhood in Madurai district of Tamil Nadu state in the peninsular India. It is located at an altitude of about 155 m above the mean sea level with the geographical coordinates of 9°53′42.7″N 78°07′14.9″E (i.e., 9.895200°N, 78.120800°E). It was earlier known as Vilvapuram due to the presence of large quantities of Bael trees some times ago and then later renamed as Villapuram. In Madurai, the mandapas built for the deities to come and stay during festivals are called mandagapadis. In this way, the Bhavakai Mandapam, which is about 400 years old, is located in Villapuram. During the ten days of Chitrait festival in Madurai, Meenakshi mman and Sundareswarar, who come to this mandapam on the fourth day, bless the devotees from here until the evening. The area where the mandapam is located is rich in produce of cantaloupe (commonly referred to as bitter gourd) and the people here offer them to the Lord.

Madurai, East Gate, Nelpettai, Simmakkal, Sellur, Goripalayam, Tallakulam, Shenoy Nagar, Yanaikkal, Arappalayam, Ellis Nagar and South Gate are the major neighbourhoods of Villapuram area. A government school for the physically challenged is running in Villapuram. There is a flower market in Villapuram. Traders and public in the surrounding areas benefit from this.

== Transportation ==
Periyar Bus Terminus is situated at about 4 km from Villapuram. Arappalayam Bus Terminus is at a distance of 7 km from here. Bus services are available from the MGR Integrated Bus Stand, which is situated at a distance of about 10 km. On the road from Madurai to Aruppukkottai via. Kariapatti, connecting the South gate area to Villapuram area, above the railway line, a bridge was constructed with the length of about 0.5 km and 12 meters wide in the year 1989 at a cost of Rs.75 lakhs. There is not enough space on the bridge in this congested area and the vehicular congestion continues. In order to reduce traffic congestion, a new bridge will be constructed to pass near the existing bridge, starting from Nelpettai area and extending to Avaniapuram area, the distance being for about 5 km. Villapuram is an area with a population of around 4 lakhs. Villapuram Housing Board road, an important road here, has been built to connect Avaniapuram, Jaihindpuram and Villapuram areas. Madurai Junction railway station is located at a distance of about 4 km from Villapuram area. Madurai Airport, situated at Avaniapuram, is about 8.5 km from here.

== Spirituality ==
The famous Meenakshi Sundareswarar Temple is about 4 km from Villapuram. The Kaliamman Muniyandiswamy Temple established here is functioning under the control of the Hindu Religious and Charitable Endowments Department of the Government of Tamil Nadu.

== Politics ==
Villapuram area falls under the Madurai South Assembly constituency. The winner of the election held in the year 2021 as the member of its assembly constituency is M. Boominathan. Also, this area belongs to Madurai Lok Sabha constituency. S. Venkatesan won the 2019 elections, as the member of its Lok Sabha constituency.
