= Thanakkankulam =

- Neighbourhood
- Thanakkankulam, Madurai (Tamil Nadu)
- Coordinates: 9.885100°N 78.040300°E
- Country: India
- State: Tamil Nadu
- District: Madurai district
- Elevation: 167 m (548 ft)

Languages
  - Official: Tamil, English
- Time zone: UTC+5:30 (IST)
- PIN: 625006
- Telephone Code: +91452xxxxxxx
- Other Neighbourhoods: Madurai, Simmakkal, Goripalayam, Yanaikkal, Nelpettai, East Gate, South Gate, Thathaneri, Koodal Nagar, Arappalayam, Arasaradi, Kalavasal, Palanganatham, Jaihindpuram, Pasumalai and Thiruparankundram
- Municipal body: Madurai Municipal Corporation
- District Collector: Dr. S. Aneesh Sekhar, I. A. S.
- LS: Virudhunagar Lok Sabha constituency
- VS: Thiruparankundram Assembly constituency
- MP: B. Manickam Tagore
- Website: https://madurai.nic.in

Thanakkankulam is a neighbourhood in Madurai district of Tamil Nadu state in the peninsular India.

Thanakkankulam is located at an altitude of about 167 m above the mean sea level with the geographical coordinates of 9.885100°N 78.040300°E.

Thanakkankulam area falls under the Thiruparankundram Assembly constituency. The winner of the election held in the year 2021 as the member of its assembly constituency is V. V. Rajan Chellappa. Also, this area belongs to Virudhunagar Lok Sabha constituency. The winner of the election held in the year 2019, as the member of its Lok Sabha constituency is B. Manickam Tagore.
