= Vasantha Nagar, Madurai =

Vasantha Nagar
- Neighbourhood
- Vasantha Nagar, Madurai (Tamil Nadu)
- Coordinates: 9.907500°N 78.099900°E
- Country: India
- State: Tamil Nadu
- District: Madurai district
- Elevation: 159 m (522 ft)

Languages
  - Official: Tamil, English
- Time zone: UTC+5:30 (IST)
- PIN: 625003
- Telephone Code: +91452xxxxxxx
- Other Neighbourhoods: Madurai, Simmakkal, Goripalayam, Yanaikkal, Nelpettai, Keelavasal, South Gate, Thathaneri, Koodal Nagar, Arappalayam, Arasaradi, Kalavasal, Palanganatham, Jaihindpuram, Pasumalai and Thiruparankundram
- Municipal body: Madurai Municipal Corporation
- LS: Madurai Lok Sabha constituency
- MP: S. Venkatesan
- Website: https://madurai.nic.in

Vasantha Nagar is a neighbourhood in Madurai district of Tamil Nadu state in the peninsular India.

Vasantha Nagar is located at an altitude of about 159 m above the mean sea level with the geographical coordinates of 9.907500°N 78.099900°E.

There is a project of Metro rail in between Tirumangalam and Othakadai in Madurai district, covering a distance of 31 km. Goripalayam Metro station is one among the 20 Metro stations proposed. In between Othakadai and Goripalayam, elevated tracks are going to be constructed and from Goripalayam to Vasantha Nagar, underground tunnels are proposed for the transit. Including this underground tunnel work for the Madurai Metro line, the project will be completed by the end of the year 2027 and the route will be linked to Madurai Airport. To maintain the heritage structures in Madurai, underground tunnelling is proposed in between Goripalayam and Vasantha Nagar. and to prepare for the Detailed Project Report, Aarvee Associates is selected by tender.

Thiagarajar Higher Secondary School in Vasantha Nagar serves Vasantha Nagar and its neighbourhoods.
