= Oomachikulam =

- Neighbourhood
- Oomachikulam, Madurai (Tamil Nadu)
- Coordinates: 9.994200°N 78.145800°E
- Country: India
- State: Tamil Nadu
- District: Madurai district
- Elevation: 172 m (564 ft)

Languages
  - Official: Tamil, English
- Time zone: UTC+5:30 (IST)
- Telephone Code: +91452xxxxxxx
- Other Neighborhoods: Madurai, Sellur, Narimedu, Chinna Chokkikulam, B B Kulam, Simmakkal, Tallakulam, Goripalayam, Shenoy Nagar, Yanaikkal, Nelpettai, East Gate, Thathaneri, Koodal Nagar, K. Pudur and Arappalayam
- Municipal body: Madurai Municipal Corporation
- LS: Madurai Lok Sabha constituency
- MP: S. Venkatesan
- Website: https://madurai.nic.in

Oomachikulam is a neighbourhood in Madurai district of Tamil Nadu state in the peninsular India.

Oomachikulam is located at an altitude of about 172 m above the mean sea level with the geographical coordinates of 9.994200°N 78.145800°E.

From Tallakulam area of Madurai district to Natham area of Dindigul district, a four-lane road of 35 km long, is planned to be constructed at a cost of Rs.1,028 crore. As one phase of the project, a bridge of length 7.5 km from Tallakulam to Oomachikulam has been constructed at a cost of ₹612 crore. Also, bridges are being constructed to connect Madurai to Thuvarankurichi area of Tiruchirappalli district via Natham. As a part of this, the works of beautifying the banks of Oomachikulam tank is also going on. The bridge at Oomachikulam area has an elevated corridor. Also, as there are many centre medians at short intervals on this highway, it is considered that accidents are likely to occur. This four-lane road is known to be the longest road in Tamil Nadu and shortens the travel distance considerably.
