= Karuppayurani =

Neighbourhood in Tamil Nadu, India

- Neighbourhood
- Karuppayurani, Madurai (Tamil Nadu)
- Coordinates: 9.9329°N 78.1778°E
- Country: India
- State: Tamil Nadu
- District: Madurai district
- Elevation: 188 m (617 ft)

Languages
  - Official: Tamil, English
- Time zone: UTC+5:30 (IST)
- PIN: 625020
- Telephone Code: +91452xxxxxxx
- Other Neighborhoods: Madurai, Simmakkal, Goripalayam, Yanaikkal, Nelpettai, East Gate, South Gate, Thathaneri, Koodal Nagar, Arappalayam, Arasaradi, Kalavasal, Palanganatham, Jaihindpuram, Pasumalai and Thiruparankundram
- Municipal body: Madurai Municipal Corporation
- District Collector: Dr. S. Aneesh Sekhar, I. A. S.
- Website: https://madurai.nic.in

Karuppayurani is a neighbourhood in Madurai district of Tamil Nadu state in the peninsular India.

Karuppayurani is located at an altitude of about 188 m above the mean sea level with the geographical coordinates of 9.9329°N 78.1778°E.

Karuppayurani has a sub-registrar office.
