= Athikulam =

- Neighbourhood
- Athikulam, Madurai (Tamil Nadu)
- Coordinates: 9.955100°N 78.136600°E
- Country: India
- State: Tamil Nadu
- District: Madurai district
- Elevation: 164 m (538 ft)

Languages
  - Official: Tamil, English
- Time zone: UTC+5:30 (IST)
- PIN: 625007
- Telephone Code: +91452xxxxxxx
- Other Neighborhoods: Madurai, Sellur, Narimedu, K. Pudur, Chinna Chokkikulam, B B Kulam, Simmakkal, Tallakulam, Goripalayam, Shenoy Nagar, Yanaikkal, Nelpettai, East Gate, Thathaneri, Koodal Nagar and Arappalayam
- Municipal body: Madurai Municipal Corporation
- LS: Madurai Lok Sabha constituency
- VS: Madurai East Assembly constituency
- MP: S. Venkatesan
- MLA: P. Moorthy
- Website: https://madurai.nic.in

Athikulam is a neighbourhood in Madurai district of Tamil Nadu state in the peninsular India. CBI office has a branch in Athikulam.

Athikulam is located at an altitude of about 164 m above the mean sea level with the geographical coordinates of 9.955100°N 78.136600°E (i.e., 9°57'18.4"N, 78°08'11.8"E).

Athikulam area falls under the Madurai East Assembly constituency. The winner of the election held in the year 2021 as the member of its assembly constituency is P. Moorthy. Also, this area belongs to Madurai Lok Sabha constituency. The winner of the election held in the year 2019, as the member of its Lok Sabha constituency is S. Venkatesan.
