= Anuppanadi =

- Neighbourhood
- Anuppanadi, Madurai (Tamil Nadu)
- Coordinates: 9°54′17.3″N 78°08′24.4″E
- Country: India
- State: Tamil Nadu
- District: Madurai district
- Elevation: 152 m (499 ft)

Languages
  - Official: Tamil language, English language
  - Speech: Tamil language, English language
- Time zone: UTC+5:30 (IST)
- PIN: 625009
- Telephone Code: 0452xxxxxxx
- Neighbourhoods: Madurai, Vandiyur, Anna Nagar, K. K. Nagar, East Gate, South Gate Goripalayam, Sellur, Simmakkal, Yanaikkal and Nelpettai
- Corporation: Madurai Municipal Corporation
- LS: Madurai Lok Sabha constituency
- VS: Madurai South Assembly constituency
- MP: S. Venkatesan
- MLA: M. Boominathan
- Website: https://madurai.nic.in

Anuppanadi is a neighbourhood in Madurai district of Tamil Nadu state in the peninsular India, located with the geographical coordinates of 9°54′17.3″N 78°08′24.4″E (i.e., 9.904800°N, 78.140100°E) and at an altitude of about 152 m above the mean sea level. Madurai, Vandiyur, Anna Nagar, K. K. Nagar, East Gate, South Gate, Goripalayam, Sellur, Simmakkal, Yanaikkal and Nelpettai are some of the important neighbourhoods of Anuppanadi. In the year 1887, excavations carried out at Anuppanadi indicate that Jar burials and earthenware containers were found.

Anuppanadi is well connected by roads. Numerous Madurai City Corporation buses ply via. Anuppanadi. M G R Integrated Bus Terminus is situated at about 6 km from here. Arappalayam Bus Terminus is located at about 7 km from Anuppanadi. Periyar Bus Terminus is at a distance of 4.5 km from Anuppanadi. Nearby railway station is Madurai East railway Station which is situated at a distance of about 2.5 km from here. Also, the ever-busy Madurai Junction railway station is located at a distance of about 5 km from here; it is well connected by road with city buses for intercity travel connectivity. Madurai Airport is located in Avaniapuram area, at about 13 km from Anuppanadi.

Some important schools such as Corporation High School and Sourashtra Girls Higher Secondary School are located in Anuppanadi. Velammal Vidyalaya and Velammal Bodhi Campus which are run by Velammal Group of Institutions, are also in Anuppanadi.

The Velammal Hospital and Research Institute located in Anuppanadi area provides free medical services to the poor. And also, the people here in Anuppanadi benefit from the Alpha Hospital and Research Centre.

Sarva Sivasakthi Temple located in Anuppanadi is under the control of Hindu Religious and Charitable Endowments Department, Government of Tamil Nadu. Also the Nateswarar temple in Anuppanadi is a Shiva temple.

Around 15,000 male and female workers produce 5,000 kilograms of Papads every day in more than 400 Papad factories in Madurai district including Anuppanadi and its surrounding areas.

Anuppanadi area falls under the Madurai South Assembly constituency. The winner of the election held in the year 2021 as the member of its assembly constituency is M. Boominathan. Also, this area belongs to Madurai Lok Sabha constituency. S. Venkatesan won the 2019 elections, as the member of its Lok Sabha constituency.
