= Madakulam =

Place in Tamil Nadu, India

- Neighbourhood
- Madakulam, Madurai (Tamil Nadu)
- Coordinates: 9.916055°N 78.090035°E
- Country: India
- State: Tamil Nadu
- District: Madurai district
- Elevation: 163 m (535 ft)

Languages
  - Official: Tamil, English
- Time zone: UTC+5:30 (IST)
- PIN: 625003
- Telephone Code: +91452xxxxxxx
- Other Neighborhoods: Madurai, Simmakkal, Goripalayam, Yanaikkal, Nelpettai, East Gate, South Gate, Thathaneri, Koodal Nagar, Arappalayam, Arasaradi, Kalavasal, Palanganatham, Jaihindpuram, Pasumalai and Thiruparankundram
- Municipal body: Madurai Municipal Corporation
- LS: Madurai Lok Sabha constituency
- MP: S. Venkatesan
- Website: https://madurai.nic.in

Madakulam is a neighbourhood in Madurai district of Tamil Nadu state in the peninsular India.

== Geography ==
Madakulam is located at an altitude of about 163 m above the mean sea level with the geographical coordinates of 9.916055°N 78.090035°E.

== Landmarks ==
Madakulam has a tank (kanmoi - கண்மாய்) that supplies drinking water to Madurai City and its surrounding areas.

In Madurai, road overbridge connecting Madakulam and T V S Nagar was constructed in the year 2015. The second arm (extension) of Madakulam and Pamban Bridge towards Jaihindpuram, of 251 m long, with the project cost of about ₹16.62 crore, is being in construction.
