= Ahimsapuram =

Neighbourhood in Tamil Nadu, India

- Neighbourhood
- Ahimsapuram, Madurai (Tamil Nadu)
- Coordinates: 9.938000°N 78.121600°E
- Country: India
- State: Tamil Nadu
- District: Madurai district
- Elevation: 159 m (522 ft)

Languages
  - Official: Tamil language, English language
  - Speech: Tamil language, English language
- Time zone: UTC+5:30 (IST)
- PIN: 625002
- Telephone Code: +91452xxxxxxx
- Neighbourhoods: Madurai, Sellur, Tallakulam, Goripalayam, Narimedu, B. B. Kulam, Chinnachokkikulam, Alwarpuram, Nelpettai, Shenoy Nagar, Anna Nagar, K. K. Nagar, Arasaradi, Arappalayam, Koodal Nagar, Vilangudi, Thathaneri, Simmakkal, East Gate, South Gate and Yanaikkal
- Corporation: Madurai Municipal Corporation
- District Collector: Dr. S. Aneesh Sekhar, I. A. S.
- LS: Madurai Lok Sabha constituency
- VS: Madurai North Assembly constituency
- MP: S. Venkatesan
- MLA: G. Thalapathi
- Website: https://madurai.nic.in

Ahimsapuram is a neighbourhood in Madurai district of Tamil Nadu state in the peninsular India. Ahimsapuram has a numerous handloom weaving units that produce towels and export them to several countries. Important streets of Ahimsapuram include:

1. Ahimsapuram 1st street
2. Ahimsapuram 2nd street
3. Ahimsapuram 3rd street
4. Ahimsapuram 4th street
5. Ahimsapuram 5th street
6. Ahimsapuram 6th street
7. Ahimsapuram 7th street
8. Ahimsapuram 8th street.

Ahimsapuram is located at an altitude of about 159 m above the mean sea level with the geographical coordinates of 9.938000°N 78.121600°E.

Ahimsapuram area falls under the Madurai North Assembly constituency. The winner of the election held in the year 2021 as the member of its assembly constituency is G. Thalapathi. Also, this area belongs to Madurai Lok Sabha constituency. The winner of the election held in the year 2019, as the member of its Lok Sabha constituency is S. Venkatesan.
