= Thuvariman =

- Neighbourhood
- Thuvariman, Madurai (Tamil Nadu)
- Coordinates: 9°56′59.6″N 78°03′55.4″E
- Country: India
- State: Tamil Nadu
- District: Madurai district
- Elevation: 168 m (551 ft)

Languages
  - Official: Tamil language, English language
  - Speech: Tamil language, English language
- Time zone: UTC+5:30 (IST)
- PIN: 625019
- Telephone Code: 0452xxxxxxx
- Neighbourhoods: Madurai, Arasaradi, Kalavasal, Arappalayam, Koodal Nagar, Vilangudi, Thathaneri, Simmakkal, South Gate, Yanaikkal, Paravai and Samayanallur
- Corporation: Madurai Municipal Corporation
- LS: Madurai Lok Sabha constituency
- MP: S. Venkatesan
- Website: https://madurai.nic.in

Thuvariman is a neighbourhood in Madurai district, of Tamil Nadu state in the peninsular India. It is located at an altitude of about 168 m above the mean sea level with the geographical coordinates of 9°56′59.6″N 78°03′55.4″E (i.e., 9.949900°N, 78.065400°E). Madurai, Arasaradi, Kalavasal, Arappalayam, Koodal Nagar, Vilangudi, Thathaneri, Simmakkal, South Gate and Yanaikkal, Paravai and Samayanallur are some of the important neighbourhoods of Thuvariman.

As per the 2011 Census of India, Thuvariman had a total population of 4,962. Out of this males constituted 2,507 and females constituted 2,455. The average sex ratio of Thuvariman was 979/1,000. The population of Children in Thuvariman, of age 0-6 years was 575, which was 12% of its total population. Out of this, 302 were male children and 273 were female children. The child sex ratio was 904 which was less than the average child sex ratio which was 979. Its literary rate was 80.2%. It was higher than the literacy rate of Madurai district which was 74.8%. Out of this, its male literacy rate was 88.25% and female literacy rate was 72%.

Madurai City has a renowned Meenakshi Amman temple. Similar to this construction but a small temple is situated in Thuvariman. This neighbourhood also has a temple viz., Karuppannasamy temple. These two temples are under the control of Hindu Religious and Charitable Endowments Department, Government of Tamil Nadu.
