= Jaihindpuram =

- Neighbourhood
- Jaihindpuram, Madurai (Tamil Nadu)
- Coordinates: 9.905100°N 78.107800°E
- Country: India
- State: Tamil Nadu
- District: Madurai district
- Elevation: 160 m (520 ft)

Languages
  - Official: Tamil, English
- Time zone: UTC+5:30 (IST)
- PIN: 625011
- Telephone Code: +91452xxxxxxx
- Other Neighborhoods: Madurai, Simmakkal, Goripalayam, Yanaikkal, Nelpettai, East Gate, South Gate, Thathaneri, Koodal Nagar, Arappalayam, Arasaradi, Kalavasal, S. S. Colony, Ellis Nagar, Palanganatham, Vasantha Nagar, Pasumalai, Thiruparankundram
- Municipal body: Madurai Municipal Corporation
- LS: Madurai Lok Sabha constituency
- VS: Madurai West Assembly constituency
- MP: S. Venkatesan
- MLA: Sellur K. Raju
- Website: https://madurai.nic.in

Jaihindpuram is a neighbourhood in Madurai district of Tamil Nadu state in the peninsular India.

Jaihindpuram is located at an altitude of 160 m above the mean sea level with the geographical coordinates of 9.905100°N 78.107800°E (i.e., 9°54'18.4"N, 78°06'28.1"E). Madurai, Simmakkal, Goripalayam, Yanaikkal, Nelpettai, East Gate, South Gate, Thathaneri, Koodal Nagar, Arappalayam, Arasaradi, Kalavasal, S. S. Colony, Madakulam, Ellis Nagar, Palanganatham, Vasantha Nagar, Pasumalai and Thiruparankundram are some of the important neighbourhoods of Jaihindpuram.

Among 250 bull tamers, Vijay from the Jaihindpuram region takes first place in the bull taming competition held in Avaniapuram during the Pongal festival in January 2023. Sundararajapuram Corporation Higher Secondary School in Jaihindpuram is one of the five schools that brought under Smart Schools programme. In Madurai, road overbridge connecting Madakulam and T V S Nagar was constructed in the year 2015. The second arm of the bridge towards Jaihindpuram, of 251 m long, with the project cost of about ₹16.62 crore, is being in construction. Jaihindpuram has a police station.

Jaihindpuram area falls under the Madurai West Assembly constituency. The winner of the election held in the year 2021 as the member of its assembly constituency is Sellur K. Raju.
