= Ellis Nagar =

- Neighbourhood
- Ellis Nagar, Madurai (Tamil Nadu)
- Coordinates: 9.913800°N 78.103700°E
- Country: India
- State: Tamil Nadu
- District: Madurai district
- Elevation: 159 m (522 ft)

Languages
  - Official: Tamil, English
- Time zone: UTC+5:30 (IST)
- PIN: 625016
- Telephone Code: +91452xxxxxxx
- Other Neighborhoods: Madurai, Arappalayam, Koodal Nagar, Vilangudi, Thathaneri, S. S. Colony, Jaihindpuram, Arasaradi, Kalavasal, Simmakkal, South Gate and Yanaikkal
- Municipal body: Madurai Corporation
- District Collector: Dr. S. Aneesh Sekhar, I. A. S.
- LS: Madurai Lok Sabha constituency
- VS: Madurai Central Assembly constituency
- MP: S. Venkatesan
- MLA: P. T. R. Palanivel Thiagarajan
- Website: https://madurai.nic.in

Ellis Nagar is a neighbourhood in Madurai district of Tamil Nadu state in the peninsular India. It is named after Francis Whyte Ellis (who lived in between the years 1777 and 1819), a British civil servant in the Madras Presidency, from 1810 to 1819, who translated and printed the first 13 chapters of Tirukurkal's Arathuppal in English.

Ellis Nagar is located at an altitude of 159 m above the mean sea level with the geographical coordinates of 9.913800°N 78.103700°E (i.e., 9°54'49.7"N, 78°06'13.3"E). Madurai, Arappalayam, Koodal Nagar, Vilangudi, Thathaneri, S. S. Colony, Jaihindpuram, Arasaradi, Kalavasal, Simmakkal, South Gate and Yanaikkal are some of the important neighbourhoods of Ellis Nagar.

Ellis Nagar area falls under the Madurai Central Assembly constituency. The winner of the election held in the year 2021 as the member of its assembly constituency is P. T. R. Palanivel Thiagarajan. Also, this area belongs to Madurai Lok Sabha constituency. The winner of the election held in the year 2019, as the member of its Lok Sabha constituency is S. Venkatesan.
