= Ponnagaram, Madurai =

- Neighbourhood
- Ponnagaram, Madurai (Tamil Nadu)
- Coordinates: 9.929800°N 78.110100°E
- Country: India
- State: Tamil Nadu
- District: Madurai district
- Elevation: 161 m (528 ft)

Languages
  - Official: Tamil language, English language
  - Speech: Tamil language, English language
- Time zone: UTC+5:30 (IST)
- PIN: 625016
- Telephone Code: +91452xxxxxxx
- Neighbourhoods: Madurai, Arappalayam, Koodal Nagar, Vilangudi, Thathaneri, Arasaradi, Kalavasal, S. S. Colony, Simmakkal, South Gate and Yanaikkal
- Corporation: Madurai Municipal Corporation
- District Collector: Dr. S. Aneesh Sekhar, I. A. S.
- LS: Madurai Lok Sabha constituency
- VS: Madurai West Assembly constituency
- MP: S. Venkatesan
- MLA: Sellur K. Raju
- Website: https://madurai.nic.in

Ponnagaram is a neighbourhood in Madurai district of Tamil Nadu state in the peninsular India. Former CPM MLA late N. Nanmaran was born in Ponnagaram. Vikaasa group of schools has a branch viz., Vikaasa School at Ponnagaram.

Ponnagaram is located at an altitude of about 161 m above the mean sea level with the geographical coordinates of 9.929800°N 78.110100°E (i.e., 9°55'47.3"N, 78°06'36.4"E).

Ponnagaram area falls under the Madurai Central Assembly constituency. The winner of the election held in the year 2021 as the member of its assembly constituency is P. T. R. Palanivel Thiagarajan. Also, this area belongs to Madurai Lok Sabha constituency. The winner of the election held in the year 2019, as the member of its Lok Sabha constituency is S. Venkatesan.
