= Bethaniapuram =

- Neighbourhood
- Bethaniapuram, Madurai (Tamil Nadu)
- Coordinates: 9.936100°N 78.094300°E
- Country: India
- State: Tamil Nadu
- District: Madurai district
- Elevation: 164 m (538 ft)

Languages
  - Official: Tamil language, English language
  - Speech: Tamil language, English language
- Time zone: UTC+5:30 (IST)
- PIN: 625016
- Telephone Code: 0452xxxxxxx
- Neighbourhoods: Madurai, Arasaradi, Arappalayam, Koodal Nagar, Vilangudi, Thathaneri, Simmakkal, South Gate and Yanaikkal
- Corporation: Madurai Municipal Corporation
- District Collector: Dr. S. Aneesh Sekhar, I. A. S.
- LS: Madurai Lok Sabha constituency
- VS: Madurai West Assembly constituency
- MP: S. Venkatesan
- MLA: Sellur K. Raju
- Website: https://madurai.nic.in

Bethaniapuram is a neighbourhood in Madurai district of Tamil Nadu state in the peninsular India. Bethaniapuram people celebrated Pongal celebrations of the year 2023 as 'Mamadurai People Unity Pongal Festival 2023'.

Bethaniapuram is located at an altitude of about 164 m above the mean sea level with the geographical coordinates of 9.936100°N 78.094300°E.

Bethaniapuram area is polluted by the health hazardous residues from Aluminium vessel manufacturing units that are run in surrounding areas. The residues are mound along the banks of river Vaigai off Bethaniapuram.

Bethaniapuram is one of the areas of Madurai Corporation that received battery operated vehicles for the purpose of solid waste management, an initiative of the State Government of Tamil Nadu.

Bethaniapuram is served by a Corporation park viz., Amma Children's park that is built with play equipments such as swings, slides, etc.

A private liquor bar in Bethaniapuram was protested against by the ruling party and its allies to remove it from its place.

Bethaniapuram area falls under the Madurai West Assembly constituency. The winner of the election held in the year 2021 as the member of its assembly constituency is Sellur K. Raju. Also, this area belongs to Madurai Lok Sabha constituency. The winner of the election held in the year 2019, as the member of its Lok Sabha constituency is S. Venkatesan.
