= K. Pudur =

- Neighbourhood
- K. Pudur, Madurai (Tamil Nadu)
- Coordinates: 9.954300°N 78.150700°E
- Country: India
- State: Tamil Nadu
- District: Madurai district
- Elevation: 158 m (518 ft)

Languages
  - Official: Tamil, English
- Time zone: UTC+5:30 (IST)
- PIN: 625007
- Telephone Code: +91452xxxxxxx
- Other Neighborhoods: Madurai, Sellur, Narimedu, Chinna Chokkikulam, B B Kulam, Simmakkal, Tallakulam, Goripalayam, Shenoy Nagar, Yanaikkal, Nelpettai, East Gate, Thathaneri, Koodal Nagar and Arappalayam
- Municipal body: Madurai Municipal Corporation
- LS: Madurai Lok Sabha constituency
- VS: Madurai North Assembly constituency
- MP: S. Venkatesan
- MLA: G. Thalapathi
- Website: https://madurai.nic.in

K. Pudur is a neighbourhood in Madurai district of Tamil Nadu state in the peninsular India.

It is located at about 158 m above the mean sea level with the geographical coordinates of 9.954300°N 78.150700°E (i.e., 9°57'15.5"N, 78°09'02.5"E). Madurai, Sellur, Narimedu, Chinna Chokkikulam, B B Kulam, Simmakkal, Tallakulam, Goripalayam, Shenoy Nagar, Yanaikkal, Nelpettai, East Gate, Thathaneri, Koodal Nagar and Arappalayam are some of the important neighbourhoods of K. Pudur.

K. Pudur area falls under the Madurai North Assembly constituency. The winner of the election held in the year 2021 as the member of its assembly constituency is G. Thalapathi. Also, this area belongs to Madurai Lok Sabha constituency. S. Venkatesan won the 2019 elections, as the member of its Lok Sabha constituency.
