= Keelavasal, Madurai =

- Neighbourhood
- Keelavasal, Madurai, Tamil Nadu
- Coordinates: 9°55′08.0″N 78°07′35.4″E
- Country: India
- State: Tamil Nadu
- District: Madurai
- Elevation: 159.87 m (524.5 ft)

Languages
  - Official: Tamil, English
  - Speech: Tamil, English
- Time zone: UTC+5:30 (IST)
- PIN: 625001
- Telephone code: +91452*******
- Other neighbourhoods: Madurai, Nelpettai, Goripalayam, Simmakkal, Yanaikkal, South Gate
- Corporation: Madurai Municipal Corporation
- District Collector: M. S. Sangeetha, I. A. S.
- LS: Madurai
- VS: Madurai
- MP: S. Venkatesan
- MLA: M. Boominathan
- Website: https://madurai.nic.in

Keelavasal (Keellhavaasal) is a neighborhood in Madurai of Tamil Nadu state in the peninsular India.

== Location ==
It is located with the geographic coordinates of 9°55′08.0″N 78°07′35.4″E in Madurai.

== Transport ==
=== Road transport ===
To curb on-road parking at Keelavasal and its surrounding areas, Madurai Corporation has planned to initiate Public-private Partnership Program parking system that will considerably reduce traffic jams.

=== Rail transport ===
==== Madurai metrolite ====
Under Mass Rapid Transit system, Madurai Metrolite project that has been planned to connect Tirumangalam and Othakadai will have a station at Keelavasal.

== Education ==
There is an educational institution named St. Mary's Higher Secondary School for boys situated on East Veli street at Keelavasal.

== Historical importance ==
Keelavasal has a historical palace viz., Thirumalai Nayakkar Mahal built by King Thirumalai Nayakkar, the then ruler of Madurai.

== Religion ==
There is a Hindu temple viz., Thenthiruvalavaya Swamy temple in Keelavasal, which is maintained by the Hindu Religious and Charitable Endowments Department, Government of Tamil Nadu.

Also there is a Christian Catholic Church namely St. Mary's Cathedral, which was built in the year 1841, on East Veli Street in Keelavasal.

== Politics ==
Keelavasal area falls under the Madurai South Assembly constituency. Also, this area belongs to Madurai Lok Sabha constituency.
