= Goripalayam, Madurai =

- Neighbourhood
- Goripalayam, Madurai, Tamil Nadu
- Coordinates: 9°55′58.8″N 78°07′44.4″E
- Country: India
- State: Tamil Nadu
- District: Madurai
- Elevation: 158.72 m (520.7 ft)

Languages
  - Official: Tamil, English
  - Speech: Tamil, English
- Time zone: UTC+5:30 (IST)
- PIN: 625002
- Telephone code: +91452*******
- Other neighbourhoods: Madurai, Sellur, Alwarpuram, Tallakulam, Simmakkal, Yanaikkal, Thathaneri, Koodal Nagar, Anna Nagar, Nelpettai, Keelavasal, South Gate
- Corporation: Madurai Municipal Corporation
- District Collector: M. S. Sangeetha, I. A. S.
- LS: Madurai
- VS: Madurai
- MP: S. Venkatesan
- MLA: G. Thalapathi
- Website: https://madurai.nic.in

Goripalayam is a locality situated in Madurai city of Madurai district in the state of Tamil Nadu in the peninsular India.

== Details ==
It is located with the geographic coordinates of 19°55′58.8″N 78°07′44.4″E in Madurai. There is an important junction of roads such as Albert Victor bridge road, Allhagar Kovil road, Panagal road and Kalpalam road, in Goripalayam. At the intersection of these roads, there is a memorable statue for Pasumpon Muthuramalinga Thevar, late freedom fighter and twentieth century political leader. Mattuthavani Bus Stand, Madurai which is 4 km from Goripalayam, serves the people who travel to and fro Madurai from various places of Tamil Nadu by road transport. There is a road flyover project parallel to the existing Albert Victor bridge to connect Tallakulam (Tamukkam junction) and Nelpettai via. Goripalayam. This flyover with a length of about 2 km will be constructed with an estimated amount of ₹190.4 crore.

Goripalayam is located at about 4 km from Madurai Junction railway station and at about 16 km from Madurai Airport which is at Avaniapuram.

There are two educational institutions in Goripalayam viz., Sri Meenakshi Government Arts College for Women and American College.

There is a State Government medical facility, Government Rajaji Hospital, in Goripalayam.

== Religion ==
Located at about 2 km from Goripalayam, there is a historical Hindu temple viz., Meenakshi Temple.

At the heart of Goripalayam is built a worshipping place for Muslims named Goripalayam Mosque.

== Politics ==
Goripalayam area falls under the Madurai North Assembly constituency. Also, this area belongs to Madurai Lok Sabha constituency.
