= Albert Victor Overbridge =

Bridge in Madurai, Tamil Nadu, India

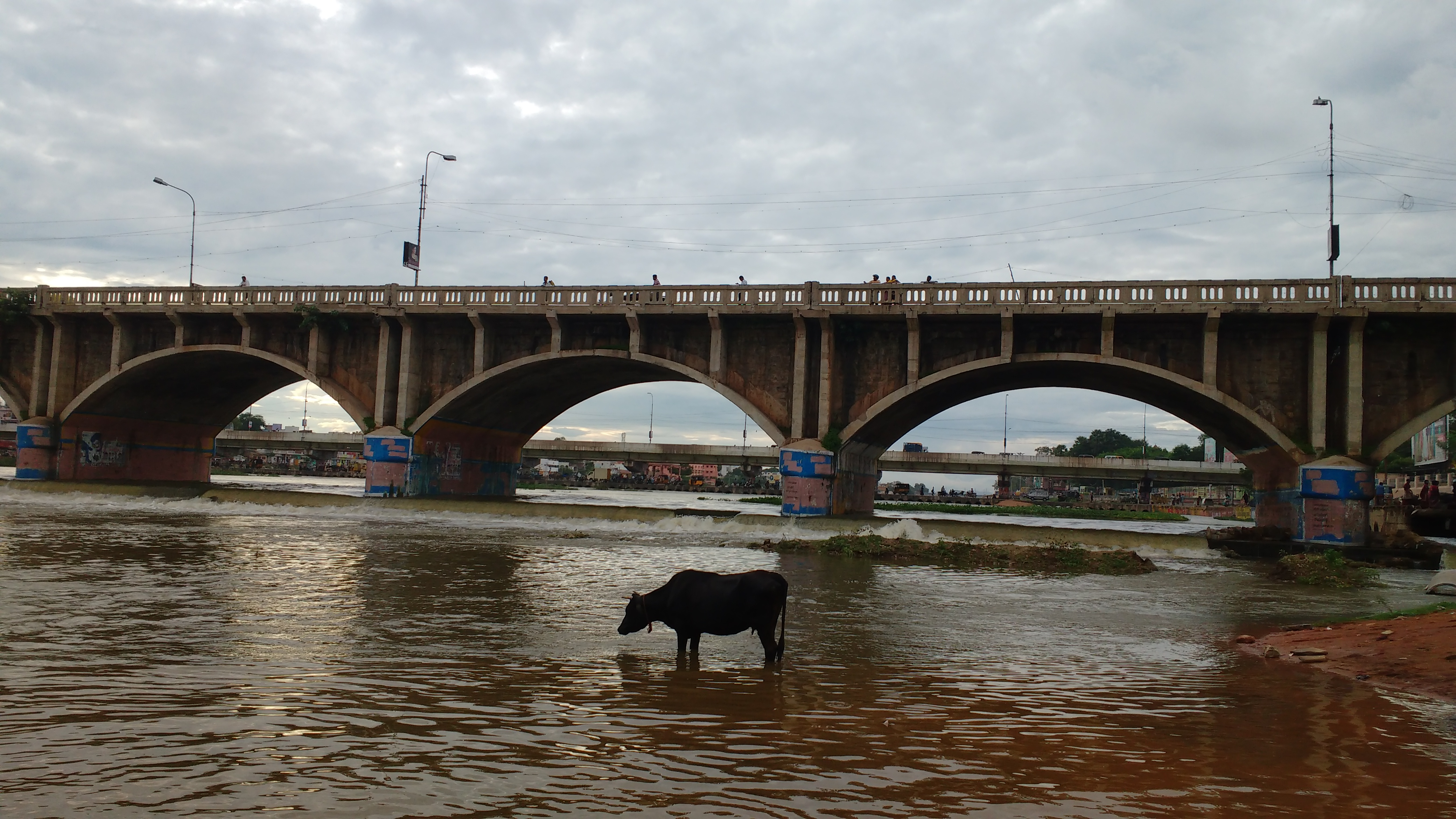
- Albert Victor Bridge, Madurai, Tamil Nadu
- Coordinates: 9.926238°N 78.125624°E
- Crosses: Vaigai River
- Locale: Goripalayam, Sellur, Nelpettai, Simmakkal, Yanaikkal, Tallakulam
- Begins: Yanaikkal, Nelpettai
- Ends: Goripalayam, Aallhwaarpuram
- Other name: Albert Victor bridge or AV bridge
- Named for: Engineer Albert Victor

Characteristics
- Total length: 250 m
- Width: 12 m

History
- Architect: Engineer Albert Victor
- Opened: Yes
- Inaugurated: 9 December 1889

Location
- Interactive map of Albert Victor Overbridge

Albert Victor Overbridge or AV bridge is the first bridge that connects the South and North banks of Vaigai River, in Madurai city of Tamil Nadu in India.

== Location ==
This bridge is located with the coordinates of (9.926238°N 78.125624°E) in Madurai.

== Details ==
The bridge was built by British collector Albert Victor after the Indian Rebellion of 1857, when they decided to move the British settlements around Teppakulam to the North Bank for safety in case of future mutinies.

On 8 December 1886, the construction of this bridge was started and on completion of the bridge, it was opened for public use on 9 December 1889. The total length of the bridge is about 250 m and its width is about 12 m. It has 16 arched piers in water. As on date, about 3 lakh commuters use this bridge daily.

== Maintenance ==
Maintenance works on this bridge was carried out in the year 2020 at an estimated cost of about ₹1 crore.
