= Pogumidam Vegu Thooramillai =

Indian family drama film

- Theatrical release poster
- Directed by: Micheal K. Raja
- Written by: Micheal K. Raja
- Produced by: Siva Kilari
- Starring: Vimal; Karunas; Mery Rickets
- Cinematography: Demel Xavier Edwards
- Edited by: M. Thiyagarajan
- Music by: N. R. Raghunanthan
- Production company: Shark 9 Pictures
- Release date: 23 August 2024
- Country: India
- Language: Tamil

Pogumidam Vegu Thooramillai (transl. The destination isn't far) is a 2024 Indian Tamil-language family drama-road film written and directed by Micheal K. Raja. The film stars Vimal, Karunas, and Mery Rickets in lead roles.

== Plot ==
Kumar, a mortuary van driver, is tasked with transporting the body of Narayana Perumal, an elderly man who died in an accident, from Chennai to Tirunelveli. Kumar leaves behind his pregnant wife, Kalaiyazhagi "Kalai", who is expected to deliver soon, and his grandfather. Narayana Perumal's two rival sons, Esakkimuthu "Esakki" and Sankarapandian, are vying to perform the last rites to legitimize their claims to inheritance. Kumar meets Nalinamoorthy, a failed Koothu artist, who requests a ride up to Vannarapettai. During the journey, they encounter an accident, and Nalinamoorthy criticizes Kumar for not stopping to help. Kumar finds Nalinamoorthy's talkative nature irritating, but the van's frequent breakdowns force Kumar to rely on Nalinamoorthy to push the vehicle and get it started again. Along the way, they pick up a couple who need a lift to Madurai.

Meanwhile, Kumar receives a distressing call from his grandfather, informing him that Kalaiyazhagi's delivery is complicated and requires an urgent cesarean section, which will cost Rs. 25,000. As Kumar continues his journey, the boy in the couple receives a call about his father being attacked, and they are subsequently chased by goons. Kumar decides to help the couple, fighting off the attackers and ensuring their safe return to their village. However, during a rest break, Kumar's van is ransacked, and Narayana Perumal's body is stolen. Kumar blames Nalinamoorthy for the mishap, leading to a heated argument. Nalinamoorthy leaves but soon returns to help Kumar, and they continue their journey to Tirunelveli.

Kumar receives a call from the goons, demanding he retrieve the body from them and meet Pazhakkadai Sekar in Karuppayurani. However, upon arrival, Kumar discovers that someone else has taken the corpse from the van, and it's revealed that Sankarapandi's men are responsible. Muthupandi, Sankarapandi's brother, takes a selfie with the corpse and sends it to Esakki. Meanwhile, Kumar is unreachable, having lost the body. Shanmugam instructs Kumar to fetch a deformed corpse from the Madurai mortuary to replace Narayana Perumal's body but their efforts turn futile. Esakki demands a photo of the corpse from Kumar, who deceives him by dressing Nalinamoorthy as a dead body and sending the picture. Unbeknownst to Esakki, Sankarapandi secretly performs the last rites for Narayana Perumal's corpse on the city outskirts. Also, near Esakki's house, the Jamin family's marriage procession is scheduled for 3:00 pm, where the police intervene and decide to complete the funeral procession by 2:00 pm. As time passes noon, Esakki becomes frustrated and sends his men to search for Kumar, who is still elusive.

Kalai calls Kumar, urging him to return and pay for her operation, which enrages him. He lashes out at her for borrowing money to lend to someone else, forcing him to take the job of transporting Narayana Perumal's corpse. Kumar breaks down, lamenting his misfortunes: losing his parents at a young age, the death of his two newborn babies, and his uncertainty about what to do next. Nalinamoorthy shares his grief, revealing his struggles as an unmarried man who lost his mother and failed artist and confesses to having attempted suicide multiple times, only to be rescued. Suddenly, Nalinamoorthy jumps out of the van and is fatally struck by a street post. Kumar is shocked, but he dresses Nalinamoorthy's body and presents it as Narayana Perumal's corpse when Esakki's henchmen arrive.

The village, unaware of the switch, pays their respects to Nalinamoorthy's body, believing it to be Narayana Perumal's. Kumar, consumed by grief, dances uncontrollably in front of the funeral procession. Esakki, though suspicious, pays Kumar Rs. 10,000 more than the agreed-upon travel fare. The Jamin, having skipped the marriage procession, instructs Esakki to proceed with the last rites as planned before.

== Cast ==
- Vimal as Kumar
- Karunas as Nalinamoorthy
- Mery Rickets as Kalaiyazhagi, Kumar's wife
- Aadukalam Naren as Sankarapandian
- Pawan as Esakkimuthu "Esakki"
- Vela Ramamoorthy as a jamin
- Aruldoss as Pazhakkadai Sekar
- Deepa Shankar as Avudaiyammal, Esakki's sister
- R. Sundarakkumar as Narayanan Perumal
- Manoj Kumar as Maariyappa Vaathiyar, Sankarapandian's uncle
- Charles Vinoth as Shanmugam, the mortuary in-charge
- Kalki Raja as Karuppaiah "Karuppu", a drunkard in the marriage
- Telephone Raj as Masanan, Madurai Hospital mortuary in-charge
- Rajkumar Manthirapandi as ganesha pandian
- Pasupathi Raj as Esakki's relative
- Vadivel Murugan as Sankarapandian's relative
- Thavamani as Sankarapandian's relative
- Nandhini Senthamizh as Esakki's sister

== Production ==
The film was produced by Siva Kilari under the banner of Shark 9 Pictures. The cinematography was done by Demel Xavier Edwards while editing was handled by M. Thiyagarajan and music composed by N. R. Raghunanthan.

== Release ==
The film was released theatrically on 23 August 2024 and began streaming on Prime Video from 8 October 2024.

== Reception ==
Akshay Kumar of Cinema Express rated three out of five and wrote that "A brilliant Vimal and Karunas anchor an effective road film". Abhinav Subramanian of Times of india rated two point five out of five and stated that "Pogumidam.. is a mixed bag that is watchable once.
