= Sethupathi Higher Secondary School =

School in Tamil Nadu, India

Sethupathi Higher Secondary School is a school situated in Madurai, Tamilnadu, in India. The school was founded by Baskara Sethupathi (1889–1903). It is one of the oldest schools in Madurai and celebrated its 125th year anniversary in 2014. Additionally, the Madurai Corporation, said the school has a reputation for producing a significant number of scholars, including the reputation for having produced a vast number of scholars including "freedom fighters, scholars, exceptional thinkers and speakers."

== Notable faculty ==
Subramaniya Bharatiyar taught at Sethupathi for 11 months before going underground to evade arrest by British authorities. He has been listed as staff list since 1904, having never resigned or been terminated. Bharathi is still on school staff list.
