= Arappalayam Bus Terminus =

Arappalayam Bus Terminus Ārappāḷaiyam Pēruntu Nilaiyam
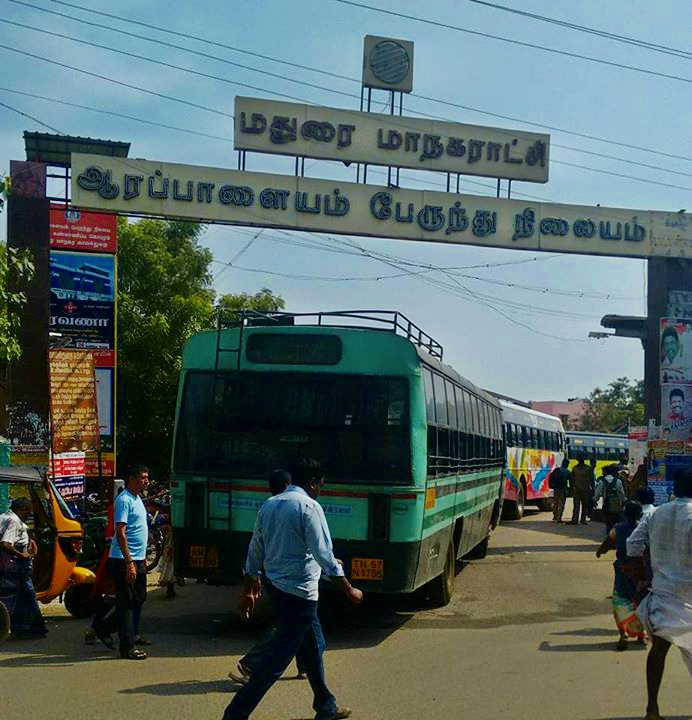
- View of the Entrance

General information
- Location: Puttuthoppu Road, Arappalayam; India
- Coordinates: 9.9347°N 78.1036°E
- System: TNSTC and SETC Bus Stand
- Owner: Madurai Municipal Corporation

Construction
- Parking: Yes
- Cycle facilities: Yes

Passengers
- 200000/ per day
Location
- Location within India Location within Tamil Nadu

Arappalayam Bus Terminus is an important mofussil bus terminus in Arappalayam in Madurai in the Indian state of Tamil Nadu.

== Overview ==
It is one of the old bus terminus in Madurai city to provide the Moffusil bus service for the following cities like Coimbatore, Tirupur, Dindigul, Theni, Karur, Namakkal, Oddanchatram, Erode, Cumbum, Bodinayakanur, Periyakulam, Pollachi, Ooty, Palani and Salem.

== Services ==
Being located on the heart of Madurai city, the terminus has ten bays to handle more number of mofussil buses. The terminus is utilised by TNSTC, SETC, Kerala State Road Transport Corporation, and Karnataka State Road Transport Corporation. The Outer Road of the Bus Terminus is converted to One-way road and Town buses to Tirumangalam, Thiruparankundram, Palanganatham, Pasumalai, M.G.R Bus Terminus, Periyar Bus stand, Melur, Tiruvadhavur terminate on the road.

Bay	Bus Route
1	Periyakulam, Batlagundu, Kodaikanal
2	Theni, Bodinayakkanur
3	Cumbum, Kumily, Thevaram, Uthamapalayam, Thekkadi, Munnar, Theni
4	Bit line (Free Pass)
5	Erode, Sathyamangalam
6	Dindigul
7	Salem, Karur, Hosur, Namakkal
8	Oddanchatram, Palani, Pollachi
9	Oddanchatram, Dharapuram, Coimbatore
10	Oddanchatram, Dharapuram, Tirupur

== Amenities ==
The facilities available in Arappalayam bus stand includes below.

- Information center and online ticket booking counters for TNSTC, SETC, KSRTC.
- Police outpost
- Rest room for the crews
- Dispensary health unit
- Flower vending stalls (Licensed)
- Seating
- plastic Watercans shredding Machine
- Two wheeler Parking for passengers
- Prepaid taxi, Rental cars, Auto Rickshaws,
- Hotels and Eateries

== See also ==
- Transport in Madurai
- Tamil Nadu State Transport Corporation
- State Express Transport Corporation (Tamil Nadu)
- Madurai Junction
- Madurai Airport
