= Kalavasal =

- Neighbourhood
- Kalavasal, Madurai (Tamil Nadu)
- Coordinates: 9°55′49.1″N 78°05′43.8″E
- Country: India
- State: Tamil Nadu
- District: Madurai district
- Elevation: 162 m (531 ft)

Languages
  - Official: Tamil language, English language
  - Speech: Tamil language, English language
- Time zone: UTC+5:30 (IST)
- PIN: 625016
- Telephone Code: 0452xxxxxxx
- Neighbourhoods: Madurai, Arasaradi, S. S. Colony, Arappalayam, Vasantha Nagar, Koodal Nagar, Vilangudi, Thathaneri, Simmakkal, South Gate and Yanaikkal
- Corporation: Madurai Municipal Corporation
- LS: Madurai Lok Sabha constituency
- VS: Madurai Central Assembly constituency
- MP: S. Venkatesan
- MLA: Palanivel Thiagarajan
- Website: https://madurai.nic.in

Kalavasal is a neighbourhood in Madurai district of Tamil Nadu state in the peninsular India. It is located at an altitude of about 162 m above the mean sea level with the geographical coordinates of 9°55′49.1″N 78°05′43.8″E (i.e., 9.930300°N, 78.095500°E). Madurai, Arasaradi, S. S. Colony, Arappalayam, Vasantha Nagar, Koodal Nagar, Vilangudi, Thathaneri, Simmakkal, South Gate and Yanaikkal are some of the important neighbourhoods of Kalavasal. In order to decongest the traffic near Kalavasal junction, a flyover of 0.75 km long, at a project cost of about ₹54.07 crore is constructed in Kalavasal. It is the first of its kind. It is a four-lane flyover. The purpose of building a flyover here is not met with its usage as fewer commuters use this.

Kalavasal area falls under the Madurai Central Assembly constituency. The winner of the election held in the year 2021 as the member of its assembly constituency is Palanivel Thiagarajan. Also, this area belongs to Madurai Lok Sabha constituency. S. Venkatesan won the 2019 elections, as the member of its Lok Sabha constituency.
