= Sungam Mosque =

Mosque in Madurai, Tamil Nadu, India

- சுங்கம் பள்ளிவாசல்
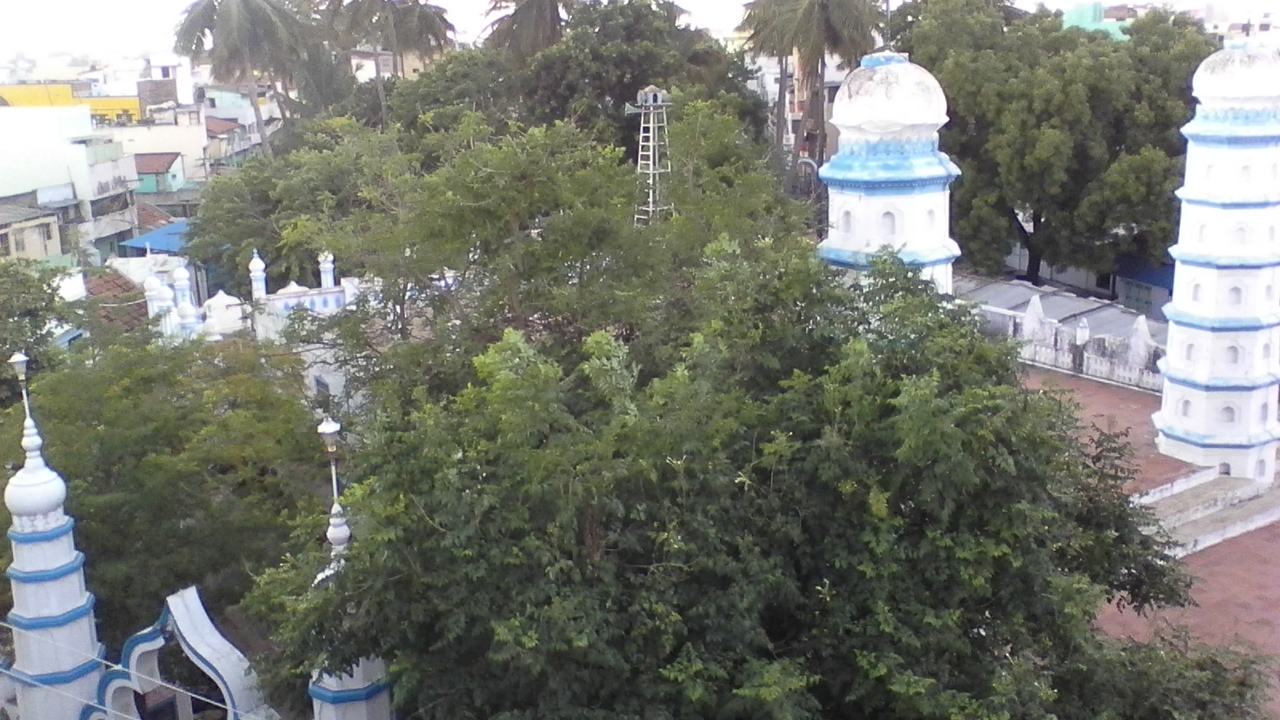

- Location of the mosque in Tamil Nadu

Religion
- Affiliation: Islam
- Ecclesiastical or organizational status: Mosque
- Status: Active

Location
- Location: Madurai, Tamil Nadu
- Country: India
- Interactive map of Sungam Mosque
- Coordinates: 9°54′46″N 78°06′51″E

Architecture
- Type: Mosque architecture
- Style: Mughal
- Completed: 1840

Specifications
- Dome: One
- Minaret: Two

The Sungam Mosque, also known as the Sungam Pallivasal (Tamil: சுங்கம் பள்ளிவாசல், romanized: Toll Mosque) is a mosque in Madurai city, in the state of Tamil Nadu, India. The mosque was founded by Muslim Jamath people, and was completed in 1840 in the Mughal style.

== Overview ==
The Nelpettai area is situated on the banks of the Vaigai River. This is the centre of manufacturing of essential foods for Madurai. Rice and cereals have been marketed here since the British period. Following the success of Malik Kafur, Madurai governed under the umbrella of various Muslim rulers. Then Nelpettai became part of the Muslim concentration.

In the Pandya dynasty period, the only way to get over the River Vaigai near Nelpettai was via Madurai. For those entering the city, tariffs were collected at the toll booth. Muslims built a mosque near toll booth and from that time the mosque was called Sungam Mosque. The mosque is still on display in the old building.

Near the Sungam Mosque is the Umaru Pulavar high school, controlled by the Madurai Municipal Corporation.

== See also ==
- Islam in India
- List of mosques in India
