= Vandiyur =

- town
- Location in Tamil Nadu, India
- Coordinates: 9°54′37″N 78°09′37″E
- Country: India
- State: Tamil Nadu
- District: Madurai

Population (2001)
  - Total: 21,464

Languages
  - Official: Tamil
- Time zone: UTC+5:30 (IST)

Vandiyur is a census town in Madurai district in the Indian state of Tamil Nadu.

== Demographics ==
As of 2001 India census, Vandiyur had a population of 21,464. Males constitute 51% of the population and females 49%. Vandiyur has an average literacy rate of 72%, higher than the national average of 59.5%: male literacy is 77%, and female literacy is 66%. In Vandiyur, 12% of the population is under 6 years of age.
