= Pasumalai =

- Neighbourhood
- Pasumalai, Tamil Nadu
- Coordinates: 9°53′48.5″N 78°04′36.5″E
- Country: India
- State: Tamil Nadu
- District: Madurai district
- Elevation: 166 m (545 ft)

Languages
  - Official: Tamil language, English language
  - Speech: Tamil, English
- Time zone: UTC+5:30 (IST)
- PIN: 625004
- Telephone Code: 0452
- Neighbourhoods: Madurai, Thiruparankundram, Palanganatham, Pykara, Vilacheri, Andalpuram, Vasantha Nagar, Madakulam, TVS Nagar
- Corporation: Madurai Municipal Corporation

Pasumalai is a neighbourhood in Madurai district of Tamil Nadu state in peninsular India. 20th century political leader Pasumpon Muthuramalinga Thevar established 'Mahalakshmi Mills Labour Welfare association' here in Pasumalai. An old age home viz, 'Arulagam' is located inside the campus of Church of South India (CSI) in Pasumalai. A 'Tree Walk' in awareness of the trees and greens, was organised here in the premises of CSI, by members of 'Madurai Green' associated with 'HCL foundation'.

== Transport ==
Periyar Bus Terminus is situated at about 4 km from Pasumalai. Pasumalai connects several areas of Madurai by Madurai Corporation road transport services. Southern districts of Tamil Nadu are well connected by National Highway through Pasumalai by means of road transport. A new separate road is going to be laid in Pasumalai - Thiruparankundram at a cost of ₹26.33 crore. There is a Government Corporation Bus depot in Pasumalai. There is a project of Metro rail in between Tirumangalam and Othakadai in Madurai district, covering a distance of 31 km. Pasumalai Metro station is one among the 20 Metro stations proposed in between Tirumangalam and Othakadai.
