= Othakadai =

- Town
- Othakadai, Madurai, Tamil Nadu, India
- Coordinates: 9°57′21.0″N 78°11′10.3″E
- Country: India
- State: Tamil Nadu
- District: Madurai
- Elevation: 160.22 m (525.7 ft)

Population (2001)
  - Total: 12,185

Language
  - Official: Tamil
- Time zone: UTC+5:30 (IST)
- PIN: 625023

Othakadai is a panchayat town in Madurai district in the Indian state of Tamil Nadu.

== Demographics ==
As of 2001 India census, Othakadai had a population of 12,185. Males constitute 52% of the population and females 48%. Othakadai has an average literacy rate of 75%, higher than the national average of 59.5%: male literacy is 81%, and female literacy is 70%. In Othakadai, 13% of the population is under 6 years of age.

== Politics ==
It is part of the Madurai (Lok Sabha constituency). S. Venkatesan also known as Su. Venkatesan from CPI(M) is the Member of Parliament, Lok Sabha, after his election in the 2019 Indian general election.

This area is in the Madurai West (state assembly constituency).
