= South Gate, Madurai =

Neighbourhood in Madurai, Tamil Nadu in India

- Neighbourhood
- South Gate, Madurai (Tamil Nadu)
- Coordinates: 9°54′39.2″N 78°07′07.3″E
- Country: India
- State: Tamil Nadu
- District: Madurai district
- Elevation: 161 m (528 ft)

Languages
  - Official: Tamil language, English language
  - Speech: Tamil language, English language
- Time zone: UTC+5:30 (IST)
- PIN: 625001
- Telephone Code: 0452xxxxxxx
- Neighbourhoods: Madurai, Goripalayam, Sellur, Simmakkal, Yanaikkal, Nelpettai, East Gate
- Corporation: Madurai Municipal Corporation
- LS: Madurai Lok Sabha constituency
- VS: Madurai South Assembly constituency
- MP: S. Venkatesan
- MLA: M. Boominathan
- Website: https://madurai.nic.in

South Gate is a neighbourhood in Madurai district of Tamil Nadu state in the peninsular India, with the geographical coordinates of 9°54'39.2"N, 78°07'07.3"E (i.e., 9.910900°N, 78.118700°E) and is located at about 161 m above the mean sea level.

Famous Meenakshi Amman temple is situated at a walkable distance of about 1 km from South Gate. Madurai city is constructed in such a manner that neighbourhoods and streets are arranged in all the four directions keeping the temple at their centre. The great fort walls were built in the East, West, North and South directions and South Gate, North Gate, West Gate and East Gate were the entrances on each sides. (Later the walls were demolished during the town planning by British rulers). Also the more important outer streets were named correspondingly as South Veli street, North Veli street, West Veli street and East Veli street. Inner sides included South Masi street, North Masi street, West Masi street and East Masi street. Apart from these, Aadi streets, Chithirai streets, Aavani Moola streets, etc. on each directions are named accordingly, to mention a few. Madurai, Goripalayam, Sellur, Simmakkal, Yanaikkal, Nelpettai, East Gate, Arappalayam and Kalavasal are some of the important neighbourhoods of South Gate. South Gate has a police station in its limits.

South Gate is served by Periyar Bus Terminus at the heart of Madurai, Anna Bus Terminus near Anna Nagar, MGR Bus Terminus in Mattuthavani and Arappalayam Bus Terminus. It is well connected to other parts of Madurai via. important roads viz., South Veli street, North Veli street, East Veli street, South Masi street, North Masi street, East Masi street, Yanaikkal bridge and Albert Victor Bridge. Madurai City Transport Corporation operates numerous bus services via. South Gate. It is always busy and is congested due to road traffic. In the year 1989, a bridge having 0.5 km long and 12 m wide was constructed to decongest the traffic, connecting South Gate and Villapuram that leads to Aruppukkottai, over the railway line (Madurai junction to Madurai East Railway Station), at an estimated cost of ₹75 lakh. As the bridge is narrow, the traffic congestion continues. In order to decongest the traffic, a road project is planned to construct a bridge in between Nelpettai and Avaniapuram covering a distance of 5 km that passes near to the bridge already existing in South Gate. Madurai Junction railway station which is busy round-the-clock is situated at 2 km from South Gate. From here, Madurai Airport is located at about 10 km in Avaniapuram.

South Gate is one of the busiest places for selling textile goods in Madurai. There is a long-run (55 years old) savouries shop in South Gate, namely Uthandan Pakoda shop which is called by customers as South Gate Pakoda shop.

Ponnodai Karuppannasamy temple situated in South Gate is under the control of Hindu Religious and Charitable Endowments Department, Government of Tamil Nadu.

South Gate comes under Madurai South Assembly constituency, with the winner of its legislative assembly elections held in the year 2021, as M. Boominathan. It also comes under Madurai Lok Sabha constituency for which the parliamentary elections were held in the year 2019 with the winner as S. Venkatesan.
