= Sellur (Madurai) =

Neighborhood in Madurai District, Tamil Nadu, India

Sellur (Madurai) Sellur
- Neighbourhood
- Interactive map of Sellur (Madurai)
- Coordinates: 9°55′58.7″N 78°07′44.0″E
- Country: India
- State: Tamil Nadu
- District: Madurai district

Languages
  - Official: Tamil, English
- Time zone: UTC+5:30 (IST)
- PIN: 625002
- Telephone Code: 0452
- Other Neighborhoods: Tallakulam, Goripalayam, Narimedu, B. B. Kulam, Chinna Chokkikulam, Alwarpuram, Nelpettai, Shenoy Nagar, Anna Nagar, K. K. Nagar, Simmakkal, Arappalayam
- Municipal body: Madurai Corporation
- LS: Madurai Lok Sabha constituency
- VS: Madurai West Assembly constituency
- MP: S. Venkatesan
- MLA: Sellur K. Raju

Sellur or Sellur, Madurai is a Neighborhood in Madurai district in the Indian State of Tamil Nadu.

== Location ==
Sellur is located at the coordinates of 9°56'03.3"N78°07'05.6"E.

== Transport ==
=== Road transport ===
Important roads such as Mahaan Gandhi road (60 feet road), Ahimsapuram 1st Street to 8th Street,

== Library ==
The public library in Sellur is with a collection of more than 35,000 books. This branch library was shifted to Suyarajyapuram First Main Road in the year 1998.

== Worshipping ==
=== Temples ===
Tiru Aappudayar temple located in Sellur is a Shiva temple of historical importance. It is praised in the hymns of Saint Tirugnana Sambandar. This is the second temple of Lord Shiva in Pandya region praised in Thevaram hymns.

== Business ==
Sellur was flooded with a lot of Handloom and Powerloom factories, that provided labour opportunities for more people. Buildings that housed handloom units are now book binding units, confectioneries and workshops. From around 10,000 looms and 12,000 workers in the beginning of this century, the handloom industry in Sellur now employees around 1,000 workers.

== Political notability ==
Sellur K. Raju who was elected from Madurai West Assembly constituency and was then Tamil Nadu minister, said that the DMK government had not announced or commenced any work for Madurai except for the construction of Kalaignar Memorial Library, coming up on New Natham Road.

Near Sellur, at the intersection of roads in Goripalayam, a standing posture statue of freedom-fighter-cum-sipiritual leader 'Paumpon Muthuramalingam Thevar' who was a significant figure in the 20th-century politics of Tamil Nadu, is erected. Sellur comes under Madurai West Assembly constituency and Madurai Lok Sabha constituency.
