= Nelpettai =

Neighbourhood in Madurai, Tamil Nadu in India

- Neighbourhood
- Nelpettai, Madurai (Tamil Nadu)
- Coordinates: 9.923100°N 78.125400°E
- Country: India
- State: Tamil Nadu
- District: Madurai district
- Elevation: 159 m (522 ft)

Languages
  - Official: Tamil language, English language
  - Speech: Tamil language, English language
- Time zone: UTC+5:30 (IST)
- PIN: 625001
- Telephone Code: 0452xxxxxxx
- Neighbourhoods: Madurai, Goripalayam, Sellur, Simmakkal, Yanaikkal, East Gate, South Gate
- Corporation: Madurai Municipal Corporation
- LS: Madurai Lok Sabha constituency
- VS: Madurai South Assembly constituency
- MP: S. Venkatesan
- MLA: M. Boominathan
- Website: https://madurai.nic.in

Nelpettai is a neighbourhood in Madurai district of Tamil Nadu state in the peninsular India. Muslims live in large clusters in Nelpettai. Albert Victor Bridge which is more than 133 years old, that connects Nelpettai and Goripalayam, is constructed over river Vaigai. Nelpettai has a non-vegetarian market that sells fish, meat such as mutton, chicken, etc. On East Veli street, a famous non-vegetarian restaurant namely Amsavalli bhavan biryani restaurant that functions beyond decades, is located. A bridge 3.2 km long and 12 m wide, is planned to be constructed to reduce traffic congestion, in between Madurai Corporation Ecopark just opposite of Madurai Corporation building and Nelpettai Anna statue junction, at a project cost of about ₹175.80 crore.

== Location ==
Located at an altitude of about 159 m above the mean sea level, the geographical coordinates of Nelpettai are 9°55'23.2"N, 78°07'31.4"E (i.e., 9.923100°N, 78.125400°E).

== Neighbourhoods ==
Madurai, Goripalayam, Sellur, Simmakkal, Yanaikkal, East Gate and South Gate are some of the important neighbourhoods of Nelpettai.

== Transport ==
=== Road transport ===
Nelpettai is well connected to other parts of Madurai via important roads viz., East Veli street, North Veli street, Munichalai road, East Masi street, North Masi street, Yanaikkal bridge and Albert Victor Bridge. Madurai City Transport Corporation operates numerous bus services via. Nelpettai. Nelpettai is served by Periyar Bus Terminus at the heart of Madurai, Anna Bus Terminus near Anna Nagar, MGR Bus Terminus in Mattuthavani and Arappalayam Bus Terminus.

=== Rail transport ===
Madurai Junction railway station which is busy round-the-clock is situated at 2 km from Nelpettai.

=== Air transport ===
From Nelpettai, Madurai Airport is located at about 12 km in Avaniapuram.

== Education ==
=== School ===
Madurai Corporation Umarupulavar school is situated in Nelpettai near Albert Victor Bridge.

== Worshipping ==
=== Mosque ===
Nelpettai has a worshipping place for Muslims viz.,Sungam Mosque.

== Politics ==
Nelpettai comes under Madurai South Assembly constituency, with the winner of its legislative assembly elections held in the year 2021, as M. Boominathan. It also comes under Madurai Lok Sabha constituency for which the parliamentary elections were held in the year 2019 with the winner as S. Venkatesan.
