= Avaniapuram =

Avaniapuram, Madurai
- village
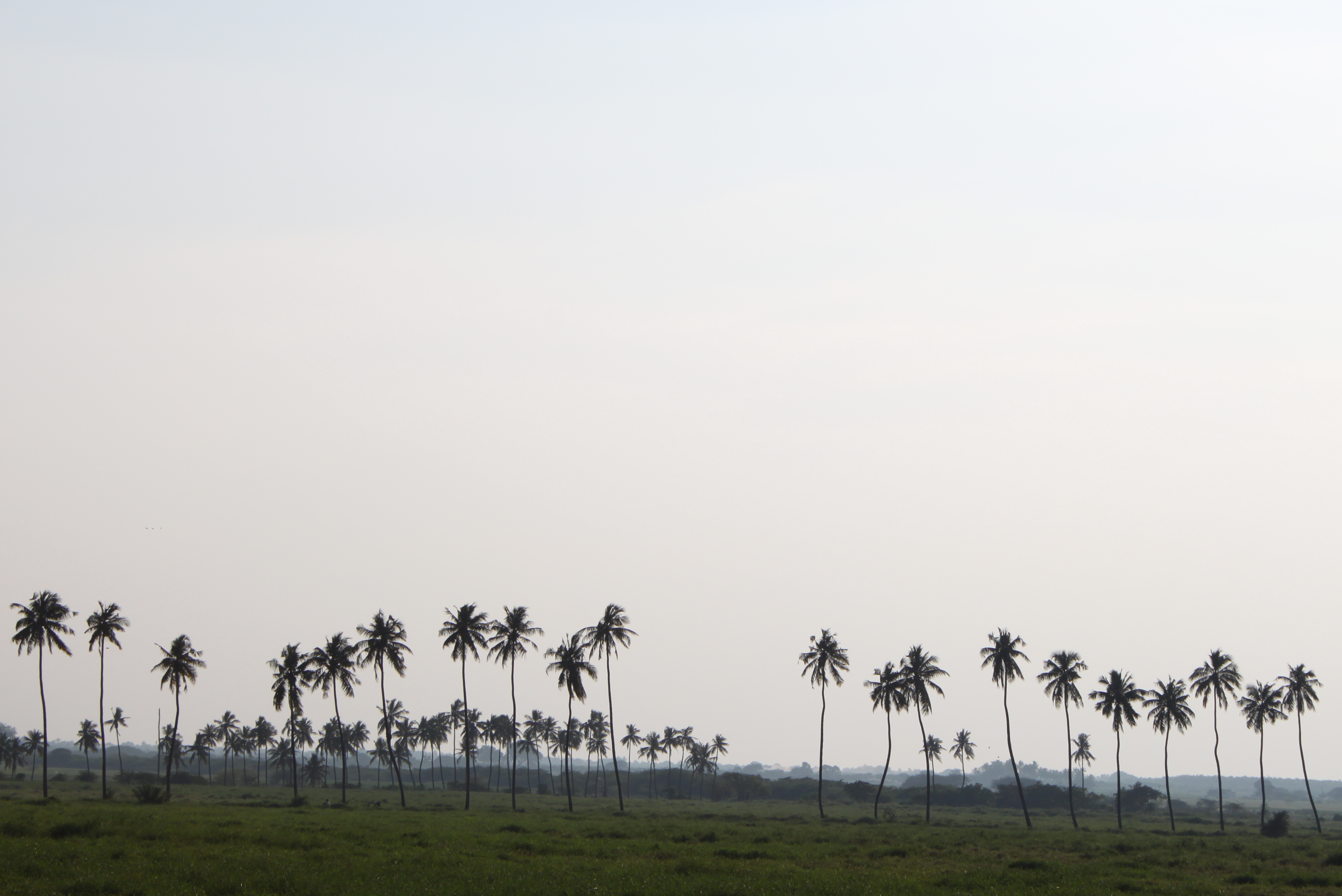
- A Group of Coconut Trees seen near the Avaniapuram Water Reservoir

- Location in Tamil Nadu, India
- Coordinates: 9°51′8″N 78°6′58″E
- Country: India
- State: Tamil Nadu
- District: Madurai

Population (2011)
  - Total: 89,635

Languages
  - Official: Tamil
- Time zone: UTC+5:30 (IST)
- Postal code: 625012
- Telephone code: 91-452
- Vehicle registration: TN 58

Avaniapuram is a neighbourhood in Madurai in the state of Tamil Nadu, India. As of 2011, the municipality had a population of 89,635. It was annexed with the Madurai Municipal Corporation in 2011. The locality is famous for Jallikattu (bull taming sport) which happens on Pongal day.

== Demographics ==
Religious census
Religion	Percent(%)
Hindu	91.69%
Muslim	6.35%
Christian	1.91%
Other	0.05%

According to 2011 census, Avaniapuram had a population of 89,635 with a sex-ratio of 979 females for every 1,000 males, much above the national average of 929. A total of 9,568 were under the age of six, constituting 4,830 males and 4,738 females. Scheduled Castes and Scheduled Tribes accounted for 7.54% and 0.1% of the population respectively. The average literacy was 78.75%, compared to the national average of 72.99%. The town had a total of 23,051 households. There were a total of 35,831 workers, comprising 89 cultivators, 752 main agricultural labourers, 2,871 in house hold industries, 30,420 other workers, 1,699 marginal workers, 15 marginal cultivators, 126 marginal agricultural labourers, 176 marginal workers in household industries and 1,382 other marginal workers. As per the religious census of 2011, Avaniapuram had 91.69% Hindus, 6.35% Muslims, 1.91% Christians and 0.05% following other religions.

== Business interest ==
Power-loom textile mills manufacturing cotton towels, Dhotis, Ready made shirts manufacturing business, detergent soap manufacturing, furniture works, saw mill & Milk Dairy farms are the main business. Because of its key location, now real estate has started booming near the bypass road leading to airport and the Thiruparankundram road.
