= Tallakulam (Madurai) =

Tallakulam (Madurai) Thallaakulam
- Neighbourhood
- Interactive map of Tallakulam (Madurai)
- Coordinates: 9°55′56.2″N 78°08′17.9″E
- Country: India
- State: Tamil Nadu
- District: Madurai district

Languages
  - Official: Tamil, English
- Time zone: UTC+5:30 (IST)
- PIN: 625002
- Telephone Code: 0452
- Other Neighbourhoods: Sellur, Goripalayam, Narimedu, Madurai, B. B. Kulam, Chinnachokkikulam, Alwarpuram, Nelpettai, Shenoy Nagar, Anna Nagar, K. K. Nagar, Simmakkal, Arappalayam
- Municipal body: Madurai Corporation
- LS: Madurai Lok Sabha constituency
- VS: Madurai North Assembly constituency
- MP: S. Venkatesan
- MLA: G. Thalapathi
- Website: https://madurai.nic.in

Tallakulam or Thallaakulam is located in Madurai district, in the State of Tamil Nadu in India. There is a 'rest mandapam' (mandagappadi in Tamil language) called 'Ramanathapuram Sethupathi Mandapam' at Tallakulam. During Chithirai festival in the months of April - May, Lord Kallazhagar from Alagar temple visits so many mandapams in and around Madurai on his way to and fro Madurai. This year (2022) also, Lord Kallazhagar began his return journey to Alagarkoil from Ramanathapuram Sethupathi Mandapam at Tallakulam, mounted on 'Poo Pallakku' here at Tallakulam. Most Maduraiites go to have fun at the Tamukkam ground and explore the annual Government Chithirai Exhibition. As many as 90,361 people visited the 212th annual Government Chithirai Exhibition at Tamukkam ground.

A mega book fair is to be organized by the Booksellers and Publishers Association of South India and the district administration between 23 September – 3 October 2022, at the Tamukkam Ground.

== Location ==
Tallakulam is located at the coordinates of 9.932269°N78.138310°E.

== Transport ==
=== Road transport ===
Nearby bus terminus is Madurai - Anna Bus Stand. Mattuthavani Bus Stand, Madurai is a bus terminus through which state-wide places are connected by road transport, which is 4 km from Tallakulam.

=== Rail transport ===
Madurai Junction railway station is 6 km from Tallakulam.

=== Air transport ===
The nearest Airport is Madurai Airport at Avaniapuram 18 km away from Tallakulam.

== Education ==
=== Schools ===
Private schools such as Noyes Matriculation Higher Secondary School and OCPM Higher Secondary School, in Narimedu nearer to Tallakulam, serve the girl students better.

=== Colleges ===
1. American College is located on Azhagar Koil road, Goripalayam just a km from here..
2. Sri Meenakshi Government Arts College for Women is 2 km from here.
3. Madurai Medical College is 3 km away from here.

== Medical facilities ==
Nearer Government Rajaji Hospital in Goripalayam serves a lot of people in and around Madurai city. Some private hospitals also play important roles.

== Place of visit ==
Gandhi Memorial Museum, Madurai is one of the important places of visit, which is just a km from Tallakulam. The Gandhi Memorial Museum in Madurai, spread over a sprawling 13.5 acre campus, is visited by 6.6 lakh tourists every year. The Chief Minister M. K. Stalin has announced that Gandhi Memorial Museum in Madurai will be renovated at an outlay of ₹6 crore.

== Worshipping ==
=== Temples ===
Sri Prasanna Venkatachalapathy temple in Tallakulam is famous for its construction by King (Mannar) Thirumalai Naicker. During the reign of King (Mannar) Thirumalai Naicker, he was a devotee of Lord Vishnu (Shri Venkatachalapathy) in Tiruppathi. He used to have his breakfast after his morning Pooja. His morning Pooja was being done following the Pooja of Lord Venkatachalapathy in Tiruppathi. For that 'Bell mandaps' ('Manikatti Mandapangal' in Tamil) had been constructed by him at various places from Tiruppathi to Madurai. Once the Pooja at Tiruppathi started, the first bell in Tiruppathi was rung and thereafter the other bells following it. And on hearing the sound of the last bell in Madurai, King Thirumalai Naicker to finish his pooja and thereafter to have had his breakfast. On one day, there was no sign of ringing the bells. So he rushed to the spot of Bell mandap nearby his palace in Madurai. On his way, he felt an obstacle which was a statue of an 'anger mode' Anjaneya. He stopped for a while and found an immediate darshan (Prasanna) of Lord Venkatachalapathy there (now called Tallakulam). This made him very astonishing and pleased. So, he decided to build a temple for Lord Venkatachalapathy. So was the construction of it and named 'Sri Prasanna Venkatachalapathy temple'.

Meenakshi Temple, Madurai is located 4 km from Tallakulam.

== Church ==
A church nearby is worshipped by a number of Christian community people.

=== Mosque ===
Tallakulam has an important mosque near its neighbourhood Goripalayam viz., Goripalayam Mosque.

== Business ==
Tallakulam hosts various businesses, including printing operations. A non-vegetarian restaurant named 'Amma Mess' serves a variety of dishes. The neighboring area of Sellur contains handloom and powerloom factories that employ local workers.

== Political notability ==
Tallakulam area falls under the Madurai North Assembly constituency. The winner of the election held in the year 2021 as the member of its assembly constituency is G. Thalapathi. Also, this area belongs to Madurai Lok Sabha constituency. S. Venkatesan won the 2019 elections, as the member of its Lok Sabha constituency. 2 km away from Tallakulam, at the intersection of roads in Goripalayam, a standing posture statue of former political leader cum reformer 'Paumpon Muthuramalingam' is erected.
