= Palanganatham =

One of the main areas in Madurai city in Tamil Nadu, India

Palanganatham Palangala Natham
- One of thearea in Madurai city
- Location in Tamil Nadu, India
- Coordinates: 9.9059°N 78.0935°E
- Country: India
- State: Tamil Nadu
- District: Madurai

Government
  - Body: Madurai City Municipal Corporation (Madurai South)
- Elevation: 185 m (607 ft)

Languages
  - Official: Tamil
- Time zone: UTC+5:30 (IST)
- PIN: 625003
- Telephone code: 0452 -
- Vehicle registration: TN-58
- Nearest city: Madurai
- Lok Sabha constituency: Madurai

Palanganatham is a region in the city of Madurai. It is in the southern part of Madurai on the way from Periyar to Tiruparankundram. Its postal zip code is 625003. Earlier (before Mattuthavani Bus Stand's operation), Palanganatham was the main bus stand to go to any part of south Tamil Nadu and Kerala. It is also called as Pazhanganatham.The language spoken in there is Tamil

Writer Ponmaran hails from this place, among other prominent figures.
