= Mattuthavani Bus Stand, Madurai =

Bus Terminus in Madurai

Mattuthavani Bus Stand M.G.R. Bus Stand Māṭṭuttāvaṇi Pēruntu Nilaiyam Em.Ji.Ār. Pēruntu Nilaiyam
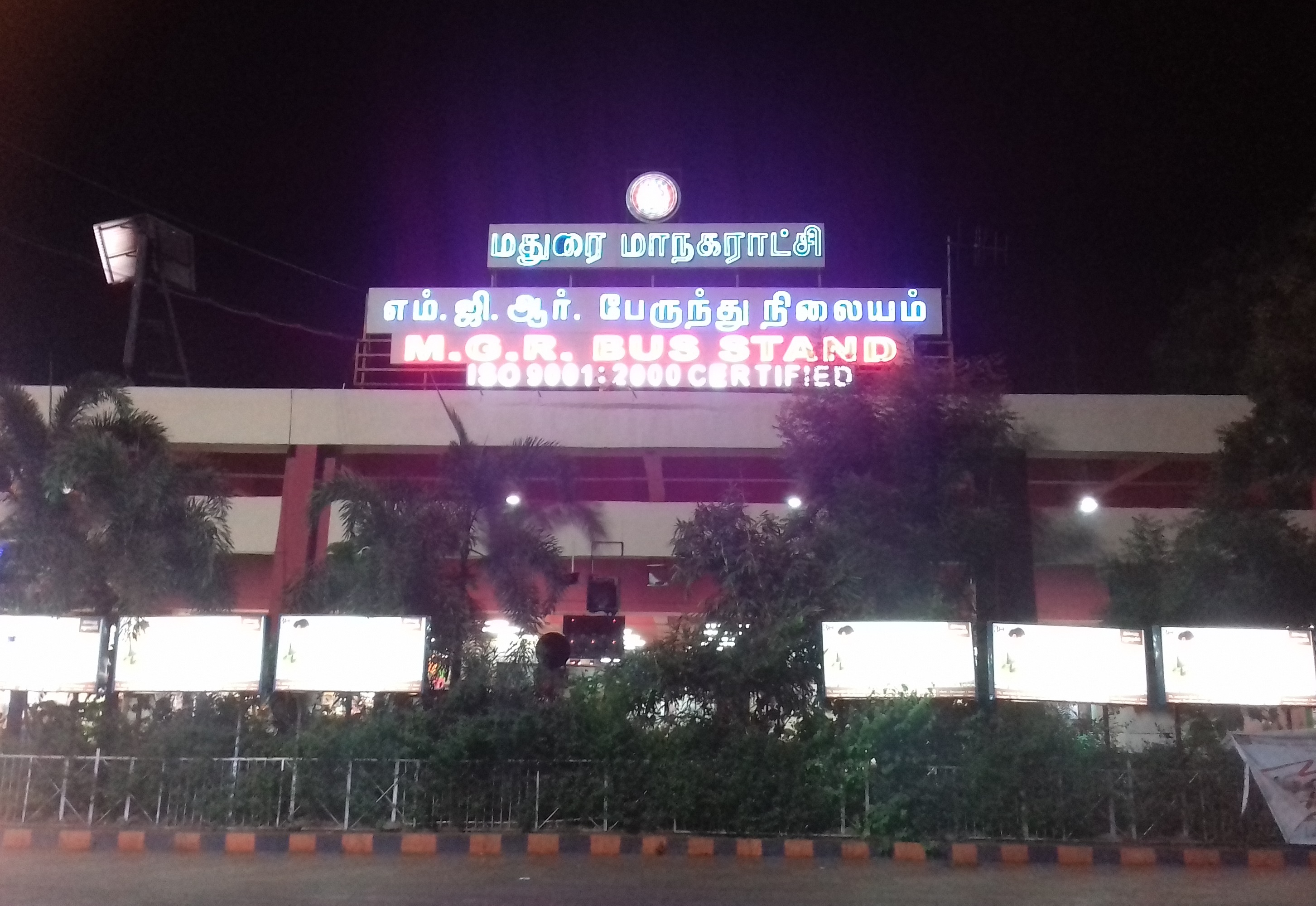
- Facade of the M.G.R. Bus Stand

General information
- Location: Madurai – Melur High Road
- Coordinates: 9.9439°N 78.1561°E
- System: TNSTC, SETC, Karnataka KSRTC, Kerala KSRTC, K-SWIFT, PRTC and Contract Carriage Bus Stand
- Owner: Madurai Municipal Corporation
- Platforms: 8 (96 bays)

Construction
- Parking: Yes
- Cycle facilities: Yes

Other information
- Station code: MAD (SETC); MRI (KSRTC)

History
- Opened: 26 May 1999; 27 years ago
- Closed: No
- Rebuilt: Mattuthavani Bus Stand
- Former names: Mattuthavani Bus Stand

Services
Intercity bus service
Location

Mattuthavani Bus Stand, officially M.G.R. Bus Stand, is an integrated bus terminus in the city of Madurai, Tamil Nadu, India. This is the third-largest bus terminus in Tamil Nadu after Kalaignar Centenary Bus Terminus and Puratchi Thalaivar Dr. M.G.R. Bus Terminus in Chennai. It is one of the busiest bus terminals in south Tamil Nadu and one of the most important hubs in the state.

In 2003, increased traffic led the Madurai Municipal Corporation to construct a new mofussil bus terminus that would complement the existing Pazhanganatham and Anna bus stations. After completion of the Madurai Ring Road project, the Mattuthavani Integrated Bus Terminus (MIBT) was constructed at a cost of ₹100 million (US$1.3 million) rupees and spread over an area of 18 acres (7.3 ha). The government of Tamil Nadu renamed it M.G.R. Bus Stand on 31 October 2017 to honour the former chief minister of Tamil Nadu M. G. Ramachandran (M.G.R.).

== Services ==
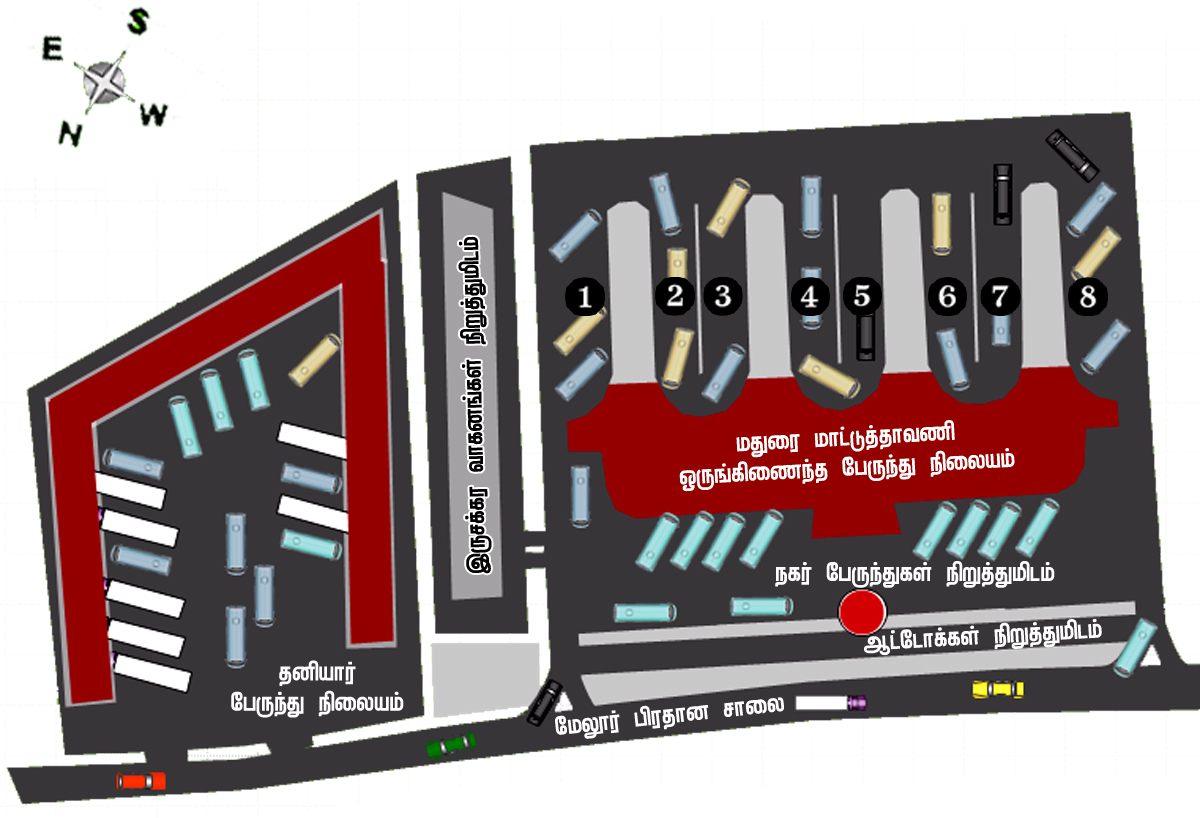
Layout of the terminus

Located on the outskirts of Madurai, the terminus has eight platforms with 12 bays per platform. The terminus is serviced by TNSTC, SETC, Kerala State Road Transport Corporation, and Karnataka State Road Transport Corporation.

Platform	Bus route
1	Chennai, Cuddalore, Neyveli, Bangalore, Puducherry, Tirupati, Hosur, Guruvayur and other SETC buses
2	Tiruchirapalli, Tiruvannamalai, Viluppuram, Ariyalur, Perambalur and Natham
3	Sivagangai, Thondi, Thirupattur, kotaipatinam, Thanjavur, Chidambaram, Kumbakonam, Mayiladuthurai, Nagapattinam, Tiruvarur, Pudukottai and Karnataka State buses
4	Karaikudi, Vedharanyam, velankanni, Devakottai, Melur, Aranthaangi, Pattukootai, Ponaamaravathi, and Singampunari
5	Ramanathapuram, Ervadi Dargah, Rameshwaram, Paramakudi, Ilayankudi, Manamadurai, Thayamangalam, R.S.Mangalam, Sayalgudi, Kamuthi and Kilakarai
6	Rajapalayam, Krishnankoil, Watrap, Tenkasi, Srivilliputhur, Courtallam, sengottai, Sankarankoil, Papanasam and Kadayanallur
7	Aruppukkottai, Thoothukudi, Tiruchendur, Sivakasi, Sattur, Virudhunagar and Vilathikulam
8	Tirunelveli, Kanyakumari, Nagercoil, Kovilpatti, Sattur, kaliyakaavilai, Nanguneri, Valliyur and Kerala State Buses.

== Contract Carriage Bus services ==
Due to the heavy traffic of private Contract Carriage buses in Madurai, the municipal corporation constructed the Contract Carriage Bus terminal for private omnibuses in 2014. It was opened by the then chief minister of Tamil Nadu J. Jayalalithaa on 12 February 2014. The new terminal, spread over 14.5 acres, was constructed at a cost of ₹97 million (US$1.0 million) rupees.

== Facilities ==
The bus station has an information center and ticket booking counters for TNSTC, SETC, KSRTC. Other facilities include, a police outpost, rest room for the crew, dispensary health unit, vending stalls, hotels, eateries and ATM. Parking and prepaid taxi, Rental cars, Auto Rickshaws are available.

== See also ==
Media related to Mattuthavani Bus Terminus at Wikimedia Commons

- Transport in Madurai
- Madurai Junction
- Madurai International Airport
