= Periyar Bus Stand =

Bus terminal in Tamil Nadu

Periyar Bus Stand பெரியார் பேருந்து நிலையம்
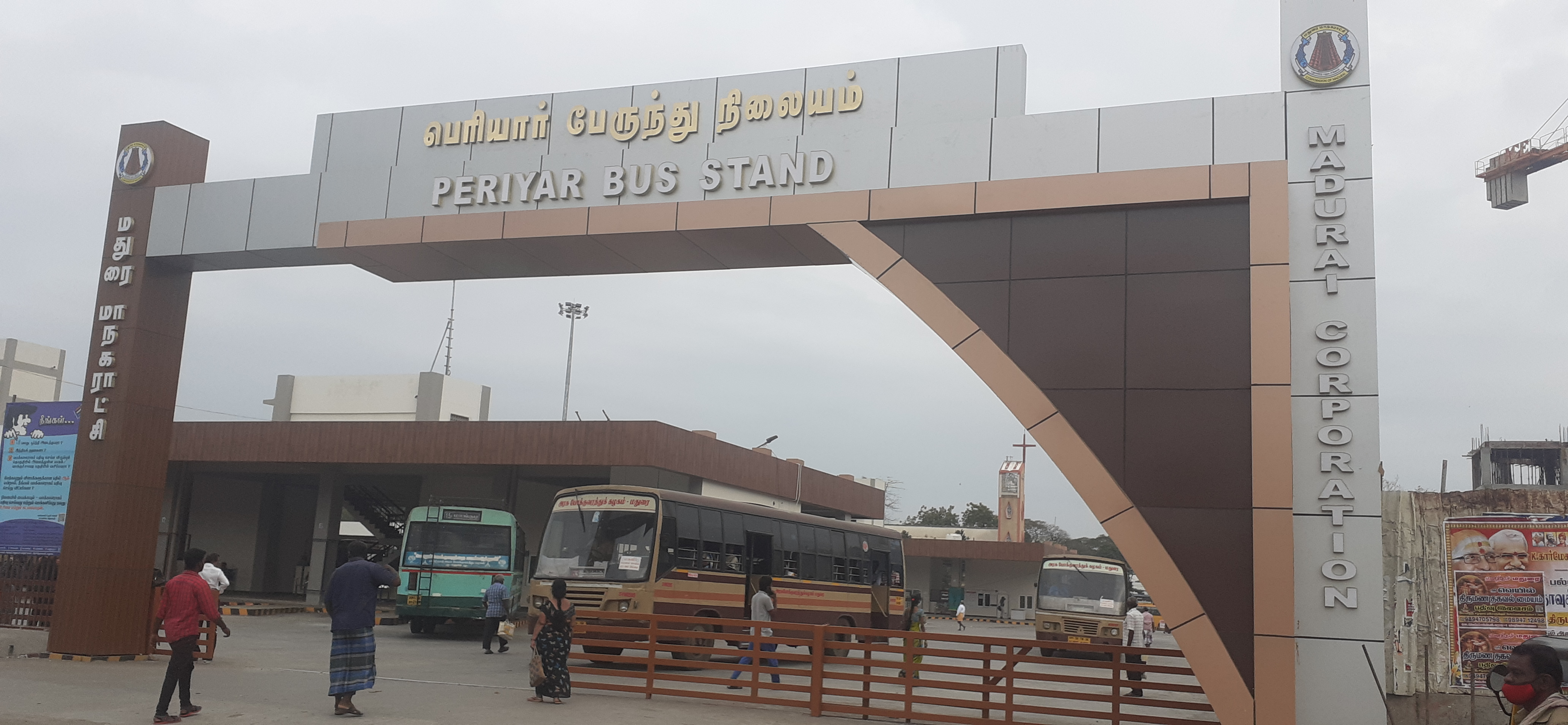
- Frontside view of Madurai Periyar Bus Stand

General information
- Other names: Periyar Smart Bus Stand
- Location: West Veli Street – T.P.K. Road - Nethaji Road
- Coordinates: 9.915873°N 78.111720°E
- System: TNSTC Bus Stand
- Owner: Madurai Corporation

Construction
- Parking: Yes
- Cycle facilities: Yes

History
- Opened: 14 August 1921; 105 years ago
- Closed: No
- Rebuilt: Completely demolished and re construction started on 17 January 2019. Inaugurated in December 2022.
- Former names: Central Bus Stand

Services
Intracity bus service
Location

Periyar Bus Stand is a central bus terminus for local city buses in Madurai in Tamil Nadu, India. The bus stand is one of the key bus terminus in Madurai. It is centrally located in the Madurai city.

== History ==
Periyar Bus stand (current)opened in the 1970s. This bus stand has been completely demolished and is being reconstructed since 17 January 2019 with a project budget of 153 Crores.

== Facilities ==
The newly constructed bus stand will have all facilities.It will be opened on 8 December 2021 as a part of the Smart Cities Mission

== See also ==
- Transport in Madurai
- Madurai Junction
- Madurai International Airport
