= Koodal Nagar, Madurai =

Neighbourhood in Madurai, Tamil Nadu in India

- Neighbourhood
- Koodal Nagar, Madurai (Tamil Nadu)
- Coordinates: 9.964300°N 78.096600°E
- Country: India
- State: Tamil Nadu
- District: Madurai district
- Elevation: 166 m (545 ft)

Languages
  - Official: Tamil language, English language
  - Speech: Tamil language, English language
- Time zone: UTC+5:30 (IST)
- PIN: 625018
- Telephone Code: 0452xxxxxxx
- Neighbourhoods: Madurai, Goripalayam, Sellur, Arappalayam, Vilangudi, Thathaneri
- Corporation: Madurai Municipal Corporation
- LS: Madurai Lok Sabha constituency
- VS: Madurai Central Assembly constituency
- MP: S. Venkatesan
- MLA: Palanivel Thiagarajan
- Website: https://madurai.nic.in

Koodal Nagar is a neighbourhood in Madurai district of Tamil Nadu state in the peninsular India. Koodal Nagar is well connected by roads that lead to Alanganallur area where Bull fight play is famous. Koodal Nagar area is one of the 28 wards that were included after the year 2011, to Madurai Municipal Corporation which has 100 wards now that had 72 wards before the year 2011.

== Location ==
Located at an altitude of about 166 m above the mean sea level, the geographical coordinates of Koodal Nagar are 9°57'51.5"N, 78°05'47.8"E (i.e., 9.964300°N, 78.096600°E).

== Neighbourhoods ==
Madurai, Goripalayam, Sellur, Arappalayam, Vasantha Nagar, Vilangudi and Thathaneri are some of the important neighbourhoods of Koodal Nagar.

== Transport ==
=== Road transport ===
So many Madurai City Corporation buses ply via. Koodal Nagar. Periyar Bus Terminus which is one of the key bus terminuses in Madurai is located at about 7 km from Koodal Nagar. Koodal Nagar is also served by another bus stand viz., Arappalayam Bus Terminus which is just 4 km from it. One more Bus stand namely Anna Bus Terminus is situated at about 8 km from Koodal Nagar.

=== Rail transport ===
Koodal Nagar has a railway station in which some of the trains entering Madurai city stop for a while for the passengers to detrain. Bharat Gaurav train bound for Amritsar and back departs and arrives from Koodal Nagar. Madurai Junction railway station which is busy round the clock is situated at about 6.5 km from Koodal Nagar.

=== Air transport ===
From Koodal Nagar, Madurai Airport at Avaniapuram is located at about 19 km.

== Education ==
=== Schools ===
Keswick Public School and St. Joseph Matriculation Higher Secondary School are some of the important schools in Koodal Nagar.

== Politics ==
Koodal Nagar comes under Madurai Central Assembly constituency, with the winner of its legislative assembly elections held in the year 2021, as Palanivel Thiagarajan. It also comes under Madurai Lok Sabha constituency for which the parliamentary elections were held in the year 2019 with the winner as S. Venkatesan.
