= Thathaneri =

Neighbourhood in Madurai, Tamil Nadu in India

- Neighbourhood
- Thathaneri, Madurai (Tamil Nadu)
- Coordinates: 9.941800°N 78.107100°E
- Country: India
- State: Tamil Nadu
- District: Madurai district
- Elevation: 162 m (531 ft)

Languages
  - Official: Tamil language, English language
  - Speech: Tamil language, English language
- Time zone: UTC+5:30 (IST)
- PIN: 625018
- Telephone Code: 0452xxxxxxx
- Neighbourhoods: Madurai, Goripalayam, Vilangudi, Sellur, Arappalayam
- Corporation: Madurai Municipal Corporation
- LS: Madurai Lok Sabha constituency
- VS: Madurai Central Assembly constituency
- MP: S. Venkatesan
- MLA: Palanivel Thiagarajan
- Website: https://madurai.nic.in

Thathaneri is a neighbourhood in Madurai district of Tamil Nadu state in the peninsular India.

== Location ==
Located at an altitude of about 162 m above the mean sea level, the geographical coordinates of Thathaneri are 9°56'30.5"N, 78°06'25.6"E (i.e., 9.941800°N, 78.107100°E).

== Neighbourhoods ==
Madurai, Goripalayam, Vilangudi, Sellur and Arappalayam are some of the important neighbourhoods of Thathaneri.

== Transport ==
=== Road transport ===
So many Madurai City Corporation buses ply via. Thathaneri. Periyar Bus Terminus which is one of the key bus terminuses in Madurai is located at about 3.5 km from Thathaneri. Thathaneri is also served by another bus stand viz., Arappalayam Bus Terminus which is just a km from it. One more Bus stand namely Anna Bus Terminus is situated at about 4.5 km from Thathaneri. From November 2022, new bus services are operated from MGR Bus Terminus to Fatima College via. Anna Bus Terminus, Sellur and Thathaneri. MGR Bus Terminus is 8 km away from Thathaneri. A four road junction in Thathaneri serves better for the people entering and exiting Thathaneri. A road project is being executed at a cost of about ₹9.5 crore as a separate road near Sellur rail over bridge near Thathaneri that leads to the four road junction.

=== Rail transport ===
Madurai Junction railway station which is always a busy railway station, serves Thathaneri that is located at about 3 km from it.

=== Air transport ===
The nearest airport to Thathaneri is the one at Avaniapuram namely Madurai Airport which is situated at about 16 km from Thathaneri.

== Medical facility ==
There is an ESI (Employees State Insurance) Hospital that serves Thathaneri and its neighbourhoods.

== Crematorium ==
Thathaneri has a crematorium, with bio-gas facilities of two gasifiers that serve the neighbourhoods such as Koodal Nagar, Thathaneri, Sellur, Goripalayam, etc.

== Politics ==
Thathaneri comes under Madurai Central Assembly constituency, with the winner of its legislative assembly elections held in the year 2021, as Palanivel Thiagarajan. It also comes under Madurai Lok Sabha constituency for which the parliamentary elections were held in the year 2019 with the winner as S. Venkatesan.
