= Vilangudi, Madurai =

Town in Madurai district, Tamil Nadu, India

New Vilangudi Old Vilankudi Vilangudi
- Madurai Corporation
- Location in Tamil Nadu, India New Vilangudi (India)
- Coordinates: 9.95°N 78.09°E
- Country: India
- State: Tamil Nadu
- District: Madurai

Government
  - Type: Corporation
  - Body: Madurai Corporation

Population (2016)
  - Total: 30,884

Languages
  - Official: Tamil
- Time zone: UTC+5:30 (IST)
- Postal code: 625018
- Vehicle registration: TN 59

Vilangudi is a panchayat town in Madurai district in the Indian state of Tamil Nadu.

== Geography ==
Vilangudi has its ground water table at an average depth of 170 feet. This is one of the self-sustained areas in the outskirts of the city. The ground water table is very good compared to other areas.

== Demographics ==
As of 2001 India census, Vilangudi had a population of 30,884. Males constitute 50% of the population and females 50%. Vilangudi has an average literacy rate of 83%, higher than the national average of 59.5%: male literacy is 87%, and female literacy is 79%. In Vilangudi, 8% of the population is under 6 years of age.

== Politics ==
It is a part of the Madurai (Lok Sabha constituency). S. Venkatesan also known as Su. Venkatesan from CPI(M) is the Member of Parliament, after the 2019 Indian general election.

This area is in the Madurai West (state assembly constituency).
