= Simmakkal, Madurai =

Simmakkal, Madurai Simmakkal
- Neighbourhood
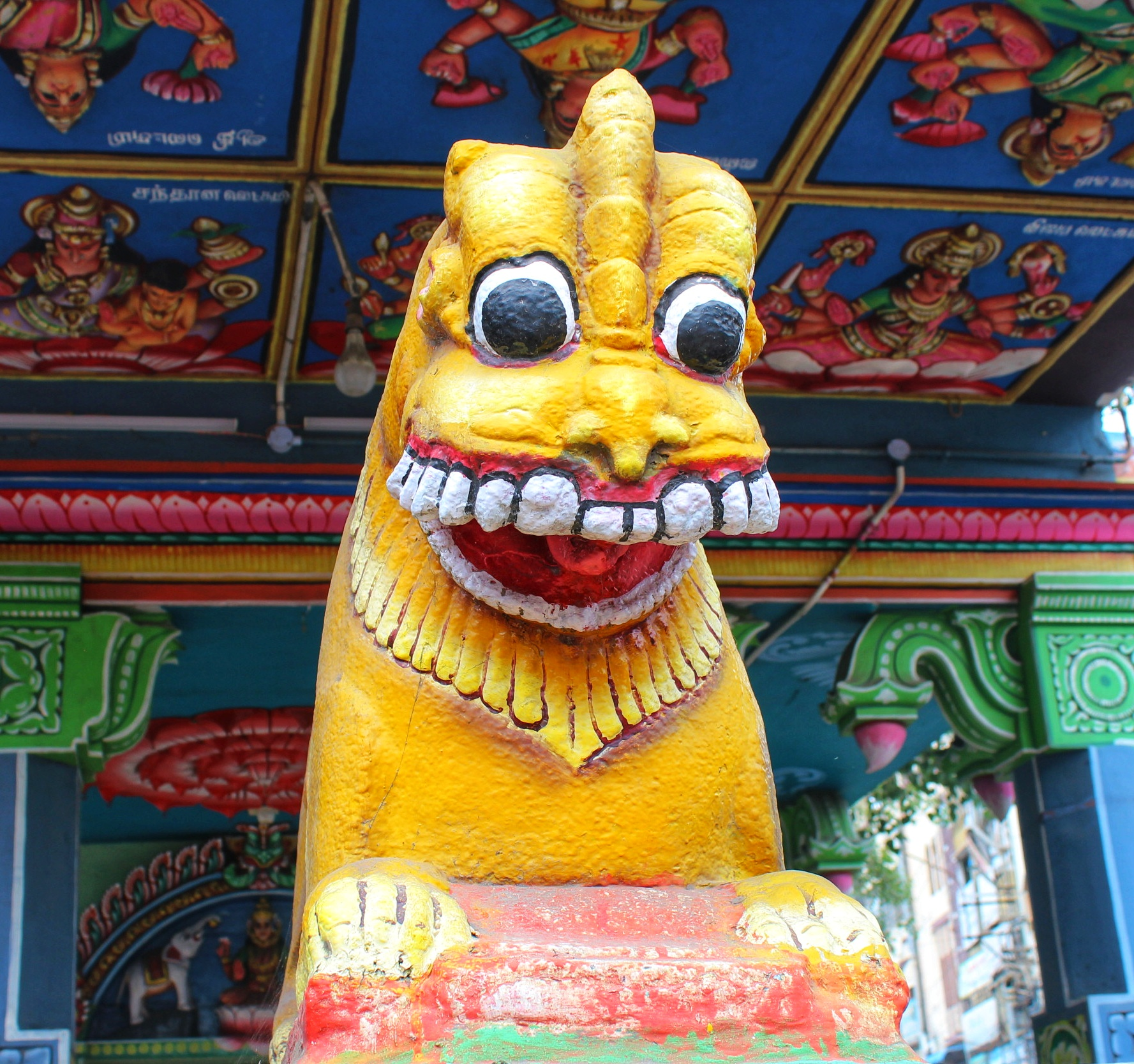
- Statue of a lion, Simmakkal, Madurai
- Interactive map of Simmakkal, Madurai
- Coordinates: 9°55′34.0″N 78°07′17.4″E
- Country: India
- State: Tamil Nadu
- District: Madurai district
- Elevation: 158 m (518 ft)

Languages
  - Official: Tamil language, English language
  - Speech: Tamil language, English language
- Time zone: UTC+5:30 (IST)
- PIN: 625001
- Telephone Code: 0452
- Neighbourhoods: Madurai, Sellur, Tallakulam, Goripalayam, Shenoy Nagar, Yanaikkal, Nelpettai, East Gate, Arappalayam
- Corporation: Madurai Municipal Corporation

Simmakkal is a neighbourhood in Madurai district in the state of Tamil Nadu in India. Simmakkal as meant in the language of Tamil, 'Stone statue of Lion', has a statue at the heart of the neighbourhood. During the British period, out of the four giant walls on East Veli Street, West Street, North Veli Street and South Veli Street already existed, three of them except on West Veli Street were demolished by 'Marret', the then Collector of Madurai. The landmark at the entrance gate of North Veli Street was simply replaced by a 'Stone statue of Lion' found near Thirumalai Naicker Mahal. It is that area surrounding the statue is called as 'Simmakkal'.

== Location ==
Located at an elevation of 158 m above the mean sea level, Simmakkal has the geographical coordinates of: 9°55'34.0"N, 78°07'17.4"E (i.e. 9.9261°N, 78.1215°E).

== Neighbourhoods ==
Madurai, Yanaikkal, Sellur, Goripalayam, Nelpettai, East Gate, Arappalayam are some of the important places nearby.

== Education ==
=== Schools ===
Athimoolam Corporation Primary School is located in Simmakkal, where the Tamil Nadu CM Stalin, on 15 September 2022, launched 'School breakfast programme' in government schools, for students studying in class 1 to class 5. The scheme commemorated the 115th birth anniversary of former CM of Tamil Nadu, C. N. Annadurai, who founded the DMK. Umarupulavar Corporation School is also in Simmakkal. Sethupathi Higher Secondary School where Subramania Bharati taught students, is situated at a reachable distance of 1 km from Simmakkal.

=== Colleges ===
American College, Madurai in Goripalayam, Sri Meenakshi Government Arts College for Women in Goripalayam and Madurai Medical College near Anna Bus Stand are some of the important colleges that benefit students from Simmakkal area.

== District Central Library ==
There is a Government district central library in Simmakkal. The state government allotted a fund of ₹36 lakh for procuring books on traditional art forms such as 'Kavadiyattam', 'Mayilattam', 'Kolattam' and 'Karagattam'. And an exclusive wing is established for keeping books mentioned above.

== Transport ==
=== Road transport ===
Simmakkal is very well connected to various places of Madurai and other districts by roads. North Veli Street, East Veli Street, Masi streets, Marret streets are some of the important nearby streets that are filled with commodity businesses. It has a ground level bridge that was constructed across the Vaigai river which goes flooded with rain water when it rains heavily. During such times, the vehicle traffic is considerably affected.

=== Rail transport ===
Madurai Junction railway station is just 2 km from Simmakkal.

=== Air transport ===
From Simmakkal, Madurai International Airport at Avaniyapuram is located at about 10 km.

== Medical facilities ==
Government Rajaji Hospital which is located at a km from Simmakkal serve the community better.

== Religion ==
=== Temples ===
Pechi Amman temple and Adhi Chokkanathar temple are the important temples in Simmakkal. Adhi Chokkanathar temple is said to be the basic temple of Meenakshi Temple, Madurai which is located at a walkable distance from Simmakkal. It has the main deities as Chokkanathar and Meenakshi. With the Viruksha as Kadamba tree and Theertha as Pottamarai Theertha, it is also called as North Alavai.
