= Arappalayam =

Neighbourhood in Madurai district, Tamil Nadu, India

- City
- Arappalayam, Madurai, Tamil Nadu
- Coordinates: 9.9346°N 78.1039°E
- Country: India
- State: Tamil Nadu
- District: Madurai

Government
  - Type: Municipal Corporation
  - Body: Madurai City Municipal Corporation
- Elevation: 162.06 m (531.7 ft)

Language
  - Official: Tamil
- Time zone: UTC+5:30 (IST)
- PIN: 625016
- Telephone code: +91452xxxxxxx
- Vehicle registration: TN 58

Arappalayam or Arapalayam (Tamil: [aːɾappaːɭaɪjam]) is a neighbourhood in Madurai city of Tamil Nadu State, India. It is on the south bank of the River Vaigai. The PIN code for Arasaradi-Arappalayam is 625016.

Arappalaym was one of the 72 palayams created under Madurai Nayak's rule. In Tamil, Aaru means river and Palayam means area. As it is situated on the river bank it got the name Arappalayam (aka Aatruppalayam).

== History ==
Arappalyam has a very long history. Arappalyam is mentioned in one of the 64 Thiruvilayaadalgal of lord Siva. Arappalyam is called Pittukku Mann sumantha thiruthalam. and also it has Ramarpathan which was called Ramanpettai.

During Madurai Nayak rule (1530 to 1730), it was a palayam having its own local administrative body. In 1857, British government built the Madurai Junction to connect Madurai and Trichy via Dindigul. Opening Madura coats made it an industrial township .

== Streets ==
Arappalyam Main Road, Manjal medu, Komas palayam, West Ponnagaram (a total of 10 streets), Ponnagaram Broadway, Cross Road, Puttu Thoppu, Kari Medu, Bus Stand, Mothilal Streets, Total head of: AZHARADI Streets, AA Road, DD Road, JJ Road, Gnanaolivupuram, Meiyappan Street, Harvey Nagar, Visuwasapuri Street (a total of 5 Streets) Sahayamatha Street all comes under Arappalayam.

== Places of worship ==
=== Hindu Temples ===
- Puttu thoppu Kovil - A historic temple where Lord Shiva has done one of his 'Thiruviliayadalgal' (a way of testing the faith of his devotees by creating a trouble and then blessing them after they prove their faith).

In the myth, the Pandiya King ordered every household in Madurai to offer one person for putting sand on the banks of the river Vaigai to control floods. An old lady, who sold puttu (a kind of rice pudding) to make a living, had nobody to send for the flood control work. Lord Shiva disguised as a youth approached the old lady with a deal to do the work for the lady and in return she has to give him puttu every day and hence the name Puttukku Mann sumantha thiruthalam meaning - place (thiruthalam) where Shiva carried (sumantha) sand (mann) for puttu. The agreement was, she need not give him the puttu which is in good shape, but only the leftovers. The old lady agreed. But Lord Shiva, with his magical powers, made each of the puttu she cooked as shapeless unsellable leftover and ate everything. And worse, he didn't do any work in the river Vaigai either but he chose to sleep under a tree. The King, who was supervising the work, found the lazy man and beat him at the back with a stick. Everyone including the king felt the pain in their back. Then the king came to know that the lazy man is none other than lord Shiva and apologised. Even now, to mark this event, on September 4 of every year, a function is held in the riverbank of Arappalayam and puttu is cooked in every household.

- Railway Colony Selva Vinayagar Kovil
- Vaigai Perumal Kovil - A Perumal statue dug out from the river Vaigai was the main deity of this temple. Presently removed due to government regulations on occupations of the public roads and placed in Krishnan temple (opposite to Ananth Memorial school) situated in West ponnagaram main Road.
- Vaigai Anchaneyar Kovil
- Arulmigu Sakthi vinayagar Temple, Arulmigu sakthi mariamman Temple near by the Vaigai river

=== Churches ===
St. Joseph's Church, AA Road

=== Mosques ===
There are Mosques in DD Road, Karimedu.

== Educational institutions ==
- Vikaasa School - near azharadi
- St. Britto Higher Secondary School- Gnanaolivupuram
- RC Primary School-Gnanaolivupuram
- Holy Family Girls Higher Secondary School-West Ponnagaram 5th Street
- Ananth Memorial Matriculation School-Bus Stand
- Capron Hall Girls Higher Secondary School- Puttu Thoppu
- Meenakshi School- Mothilal 4th Street
- Kumar English School - Mothilal 4th Street
- Angel Nursery School - Mothilal 3rd Street
- Rajam Vidyalayam - Kaalavasal,
- Madurai Muthu Middle School- Azhagaradi,
- Loyola Technical Institute (Rai Robinson Institute)- Gnanaolivupuram
- Madurai community college, (Rai Robinson studied at this college)
- Virtual soft science - Raja street, Kanmaikarai
- mangayarkarasi higher secondary school - annathoppu
- Madura Labour Welfare Association School

== Shopping Centers ==
- G.R.T Fancy Store having all kinds of fancy items which is located middle of the D.D road.
- Raja Store of West Ponnagaram Main Road,
- Ceylon City of Mothilal Main Road
- Kumaran Book Stop on Arappalaym Cross Road now closed
- Dinesh Store near Guru Theatre is a very old and popular fancy shop.

== Bus Stand ==
Arapplayam bus station is a major junction for the TNSTC, SETC buses going towards Coimbatore, Salem, Dharmapuri, Tirupur, Dharapuram, Gobichettipalayam, Theni, Kambam, Karur and Dindigul. It is well connected with the railway station, Mattuthavani bus stand, Anna bus stand and Periayar bus stand. Buses are operated to Thirumangalam, Theppakulam, Anna Nagar and Madurai Kamaraj University from Arappalyam bus stand.

== Theatres ==
Many theatres are there in Aarappalaym:

- Mathi Theatre
- Guru Theatre - Bethaniapuram
- Midland Theatre
- Vellaikannu Theatre
- Solamalai Theatre-Arasaradi,
- Ram-Victoria Theatre-Arasaradi Now Closed
- Maapilai, Manikka Vinayagar theatres - Kaalavaasal

== Connections ==
Arapalayam is located at a distance of:

- 1 km from Meenakshi Amman Temple,
- 1 km from Madurai Junction and
- 1 km from Periyar Bus Terminus.

== Politics ==
Arappalyam is a part of the Madurai West Assembly constituency and Madurai Lok Sabha constituency.
