= Yanaikkal, Madurai =

Yanaikkal, Madurai Yanaikkal
- Neighbourhood
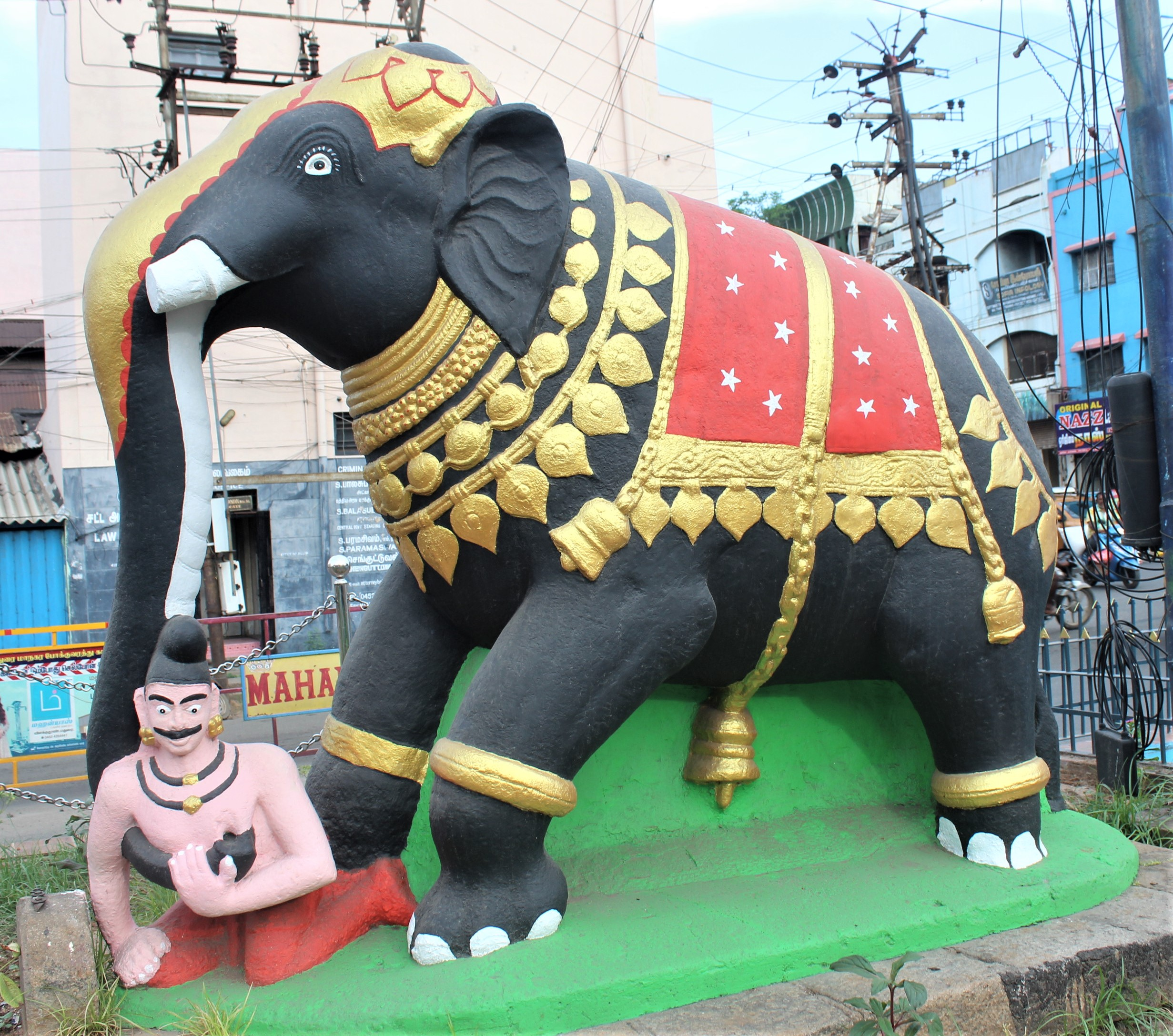
- Statue of an elephant, Yanaikkal, Madurai
- Interactive map of Yanaikkal, Madurai
- Coordinates: 9°55′24.9″N 78°07′24.7″E
- Country: India
- State: Tamil Nadu
- District: Madurai district
- Elevation: 158 m (518 ft)

Languages
  - Official: Tamil, English
  - Speech: Tamil, English
- Time zone: UTC+5:30 (IST)
- PIN: 625001
- Telephone Code: 0452
- Neighbourhoods: Madurai, Sellur, Tallakulam, Goripalayam, Shenoy Nagar, Simmakkal, Nelpettai, East Gate, Arappalayam
- Corporation: Madurai Municipal Corporation

Yanaikkal is a neighbourhood in Madurai district in the state of Tamil Nadu in India. Yanaikkal as the name in Tamil language implies that it is a 'Stone Statue of Elephant'. The area was said to be 'Allankadi' in Tamil language (அல்லங்காடி), which was busy with selling products during night times, several hundred years ago.

== Location ==
Located at the elevation of 158 m above the mean sea level, the geographical coordinates of Yanaikkal are: 9°55'24.9"N, 78°07'24.7"E (i.e. 9.923583°N, 78.123528°E).

== Neighbourhoods ==
Madurai, Simmakkal, Sellur (Madurai), Goripalayam, Nelpettai, East Gate, Arappalayam are some of the important places nearby.

== Vaigai river ==
The River Vaigai flows near to Yanaikkal and there is a low level Yanaikkal bridge, that connects the north and south banks of Vaigai, which helps commuters to pass from Yanaikkal to Sellur and vice versa. But, in rainy seasons, excess water flows over the Yanaikkal bridge and traffic blocked. In order to overcome this, a high-level bridge is going to be constructed. While the waste water mixes with Vaigai river near Yanaikkal bridge, water hyacinth enormously grow near pillars and choke the water flow. This is also one of the reasons of traffic jams near Yanaikkal.

== Education ==
=== Schools ===
The notable school in Yanaikkal is M.A.V.M.M. Higher Secondary School. Another school near Yanaikkal is Athimoolam Primary School, in Simmakkal where 'School Breakfast Programme' for students of class 1 to class 5, was launched by the Tamil Nadu CM on 15 September 2022.

=== Colleges ===
American College, Madurai in Goripalayam, Sri Meenakshi Government Arts College for Women in Goripalayam and Madurai Medical College near Anna Bus Stand are some of the important colleges that benefit students from Simmakkal area.

== Transport ==
=== Road transport ===
Yanaikkal is very well connected to various places of Madurai and other districts by roads. North Veli Street, East Veli Street, Masi streets, Marret streets are some of the important nearby streets that are filled with commodity businesses. It has a ground level bridge that was constructed across the Vaigai river which goes flooded with rain water when it rains heavily. During such times, the vehicle traffic is considerably affected.

=== Rail transport ===
From Yanaikkal, Madurai Junction railway station is just 2 km.

=== Air transport ===
Madurai International Airport at Avaniyapuram is located at about 10 km from Yanaikkal.

== Medical facilities ==
Yanaikkal area people are also served by Government Rajaji Hospital at Goripalayam, situated at a walkable distance of 1 km.

== Religion ==
=== Temples ===
Apart from Meenakshi Temple, Madurai, Pechi Amman temple and Adhi Chokkanathar temple are the important temples near Yanaikkal. Adhi Chokkanathar temple is said to be the basic temple of Meenakshi Temple, Madurai which is located at a walkable distance from Yanaikkal. It has the main deities as Chokkanathar and Meenakshi. With the Viruksha as Kadamba tree and Theertha as Pottamarai Theertha, this temple is also called as North Alavai.
