= Madurai Municipal Corporation =

Municipal Corporation of Tamil Nadu, India

Corporation of Madurai
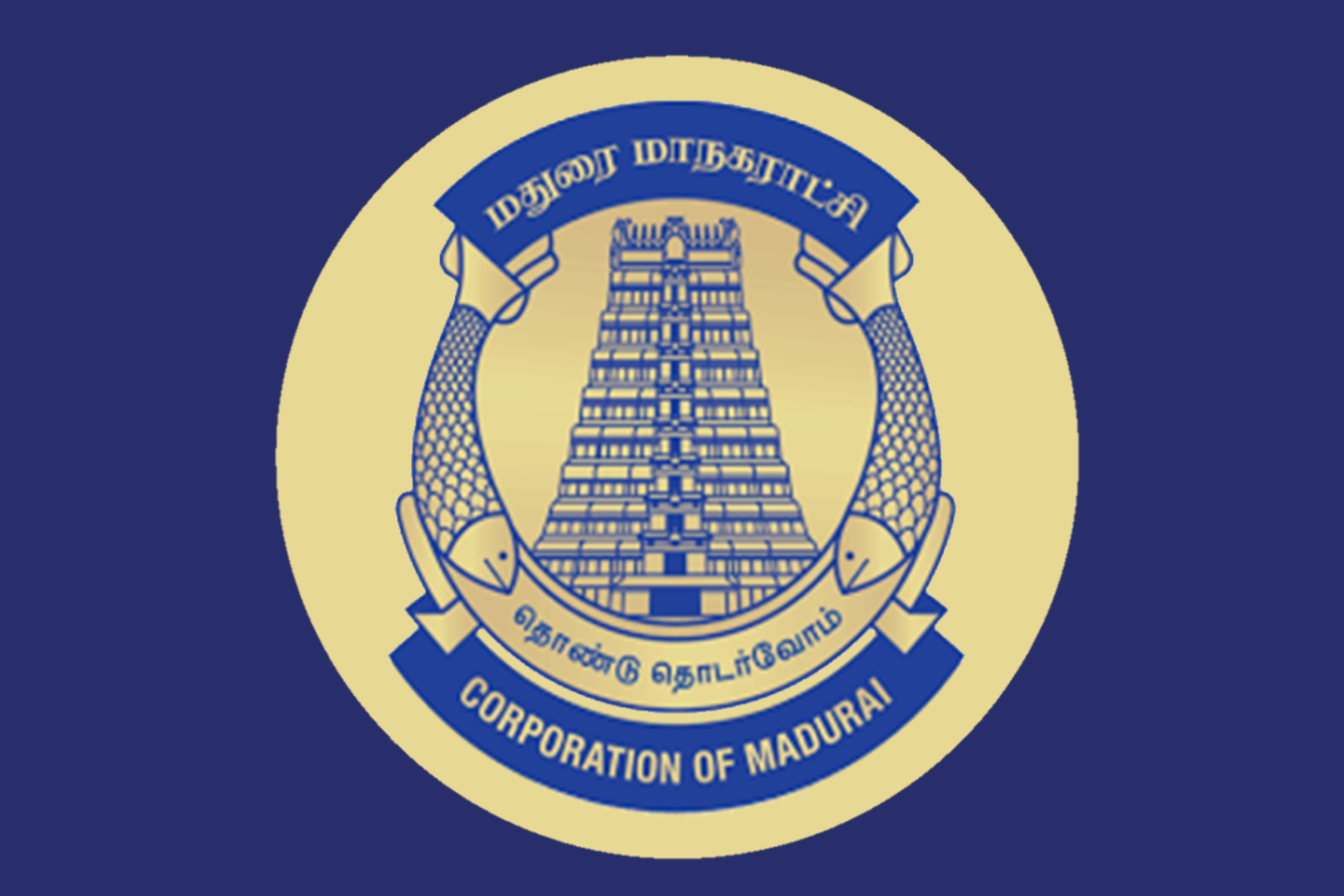
- Flag of the Municipal Corporation of Madurai

Type
- Type: Municipal Corporation

History
- Founded: 1 November 1866 (159 years ago)

Leadership
- Mayor: Vacant (since October 2025)
- Commissioner: Chitra Vijayan IAS
- Deputy Mayor: T. Nagarajan, CPI(M)
- Deputy Commissioners: S. Chitra; R. Jainulaptheen

Structure
- Seats: 100
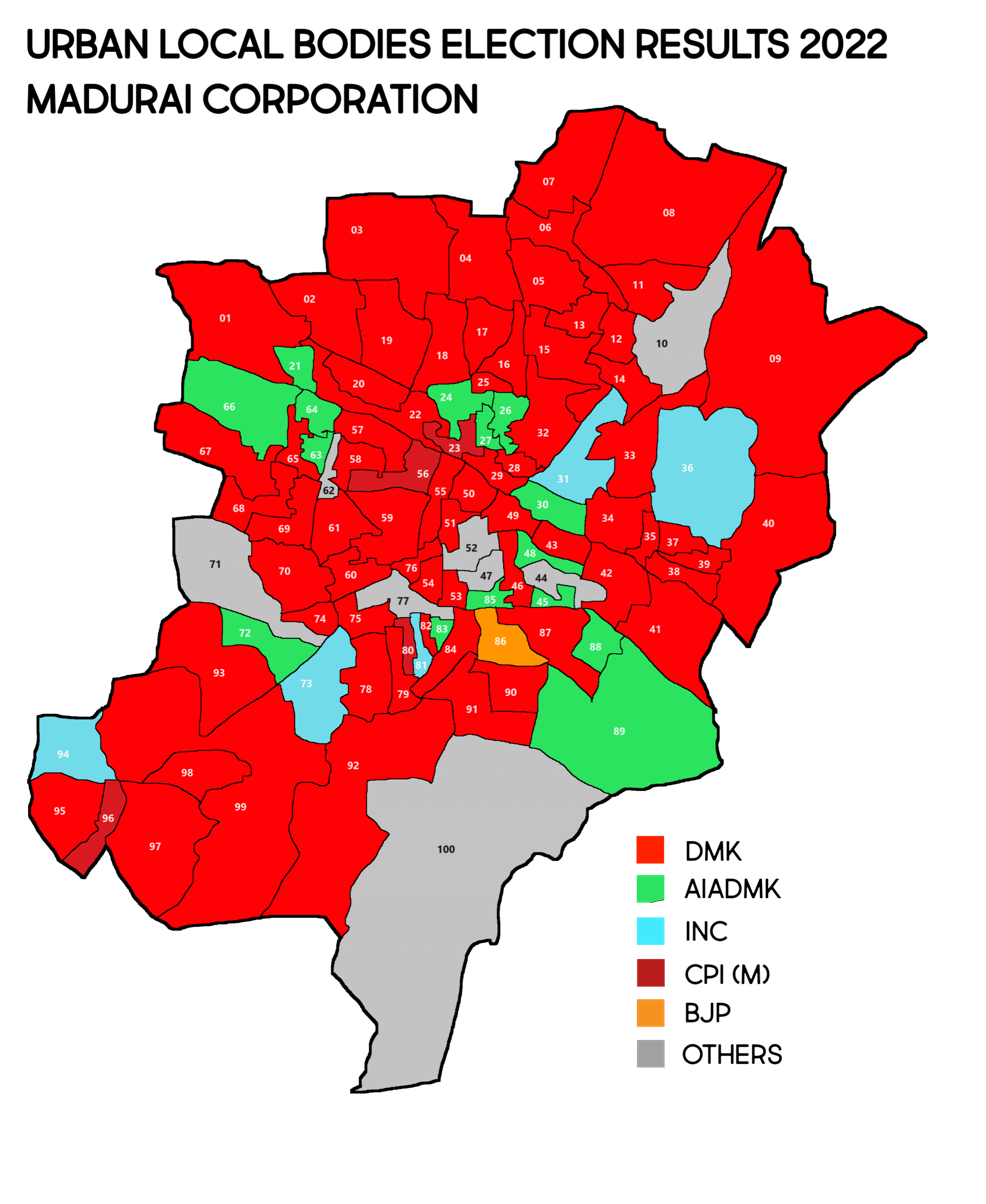
- Political groups: Government (67): SPA (67); DMK (67); Opposition (16): AIADMK+ (16); AIADMK (15); BJP (1); Others (17): TVK+ (13); INC (5); VCK (1); CPI(M) (4); MDMK (3); IND (4)

Elections
- Last election: 2022
- Next election: 2027

Motto
- Toṇṭu toṭarvōm, "We shall continue our public service"

Meeting place
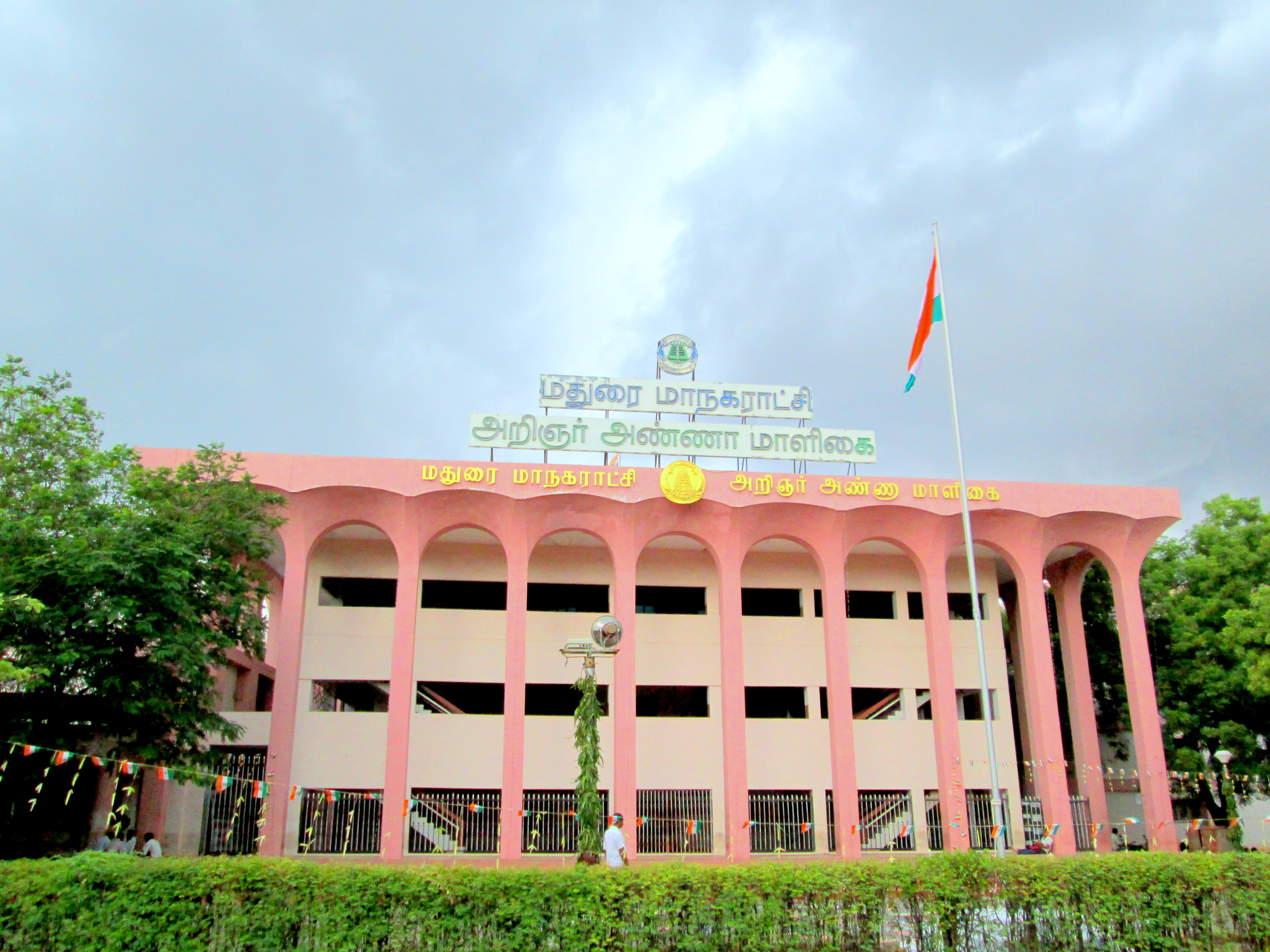
- Arignar Anna Maligai

Website
- www.maduraicorporation.co.in

Corporation of Madurai is the civic body which administers the city of Madurai in Tamil Nadu, India. Formed on 1 May 1971 as the first Municipal Corporation in Tamil Nadu post independence, it is the third largest municipal corporation in Tamil Nadu in population and revenue. It is also the third largest in Tamil Nadu by population after Greater Chennai Corporation and Coimbatore Municipal Corporation and fifth largest in area after Greater Chennai Corporation, Coimbatore Municipal Corporation, Tiruchirappalli Municipal Corporation, and Tiruppur Municipal Corporation. The annual budget of Madurai Corporation for 2021–22 is Rs.437 crores. It consists of a Council and an Executive wings. The council is headed by the Mayor while the Executive wing is headed by the Commissioner. It consists of 100 wards organised into five zones, viz East, North, Central, South and West.

== History ==
The municipality of Madurai was constituted on 1 November 1866 as per the Town Improvement Act of 1865. The municipality was headed by a chairperson and elections were regularly conducted for the post except during the period 1891 to 1896, when no elections were held due to violent factionalism. A Secretary was appointed in 1898 to assist the Municipal Chairperson. A municipal office was established in 1871–1872 in a portion of the Thirumalai Nayak's palace. The municipality repaired a causeway across the Vaigai River in 1884 and founded a maternity hospital in 1873. In 1892, the Madurai municipality commissioned 'Arappalayam Water Works' a water-supply project headed by J. A. Jones, Sanitary Engineer to the Madras government, to construct a channel redirecting the waters of the Vaigai River and purifying them. The project was eventually completed in 1894 at a cost of Rs.6,23,000, including a Rs.1,96,000 grant from the government of Madras Presidency. The cost of maintenance was estimated at Rs.32,753. A drainage system for the portion surrounded by the four Masi streets was completed in 1902. During the early years of independent India, the Madurai municipality was dominated by reformists of the Indian National Congress. As early as December 1923, the municipality had passed a resolution prohibiting the sale of liquor and intoxicants in Madurai city. Madurai was upgraded to a municipal corporation on 1 May 1971 as per the Madurai City Municipal Corporation Act, 1971. It is the second oldest municipal corporation in Tamil Nadu, after Chennai.

Karuppayurani, Othakadai, Narasingam, Kathakinaru, Andarkottaram, Sakkimangalam, Karseri, Chettikulam, Kovil Pappakudi, Alathur, Petchikulam, Viraganur and Perungudi village panchayats are annexed to Madurai Corporation

== Structure ==
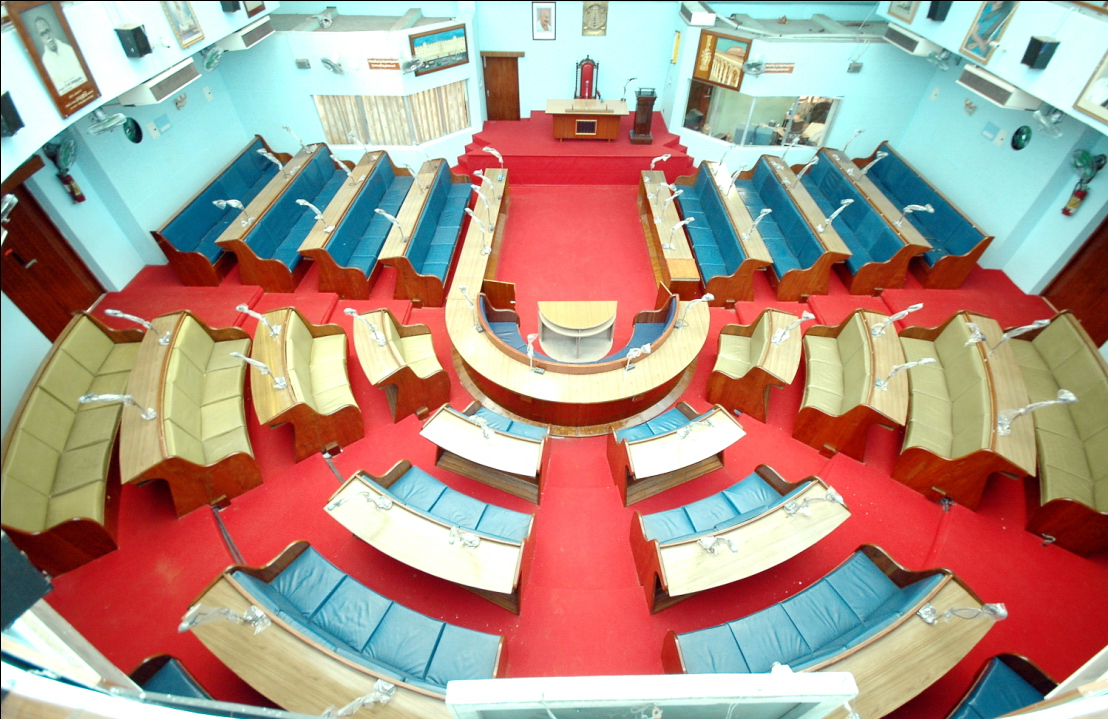
The Corporation of Madurai

The Madurai City Municipal Corporation Council, the legislative body, comprises 100 councilors elected from each of the 100 wards and is headed by a Mayor assisted by a Deputy Mayor. The executive wing is made up of seven departments: general administration, revenue, town planning, engineering, public health, education and finance, and accounts, and is headed by a City Commissioner. The Commissioner is assisted by a Deputy Commissioner, City Engineer, City Health Officer, City Education Officer, two Executive Engineers, and Assistant Commissioners apart from others.

- Madurai East Panchayat Union: Paravi, Karuppayurai, Othakadi, Narasingam, Kathakinaru, Arumbanur [Subramanipuram, Muniandipuram, Yanaimalai Kuvari, A.P.Malaiyandipuram, Indira Colony (part)], Kodikulam [Malaichamipuram, Ayyappan Nagar, Vaval Thootam (Part)].
- Madurai West Panchayat Union:

== List of mayors ==
- S. Muthu (1971–1980)
- S.K.Balakrishnan (1980–1982)
- S. Patturajan (1982–1984)
- P. Kulandaivelu (1996–2001)
- C. Ramachandran (2001–2006)
- G. Thenmozhi Gopinathan (2006–2011) first women mayor of Madurai
- V. V. Rajan Chellappa (2011–2016)
- Indirani Pon Vasanth(2022–2025)

== List of deputy mayors ==
- K S Shanthanam (1972–1974)
- M. Natarajan (1974–1975)
- S. Navaneetha Krishnan (1980–1982)
- Misa M.Pandian (1996–2001)
- D. Chinna Samy (2001–2005)
- S. Syed Ghouse Basha (2005–2006)
- P.M.Mannan (2006–2011)
- R.Gopalakrishnan (2011–2014)
- M.Thiraviyam (2014–2016)
- T. Nagarajan (2022–present)

== List of committee chairpersons (2022) ==
1. Accounts Committee – TMT I.Noor Jahan (2022 to Present)
2. Education Committee –
3. Public Health Committee –
4. Taxation and Finance Committee –
5. Town Planning and Improvement Committee –
6. Works Committee –

== List of zonal chairpersons (wards committee) (2022) ==
1. East Zone -Tmt.Vasuki Sasikumar
2. North Zone -Tmt.A.Saravanabhuvaneshwari
1. Central Zone –
2. South Zone –
3. West Zone –

== List of councillors (2022) ==
- 1 Tmt. D.Sharmila
- 2 Tmt. M.Amutha
- 3 Thiru. G.Selva Ganapathy
- 4 Tmt. K.Nandhini
- 5 Tmt. S.Vasuki
- 6 Tmt. B.Palselvi
- 7 Thiru. M.Ramamoorthy
- 8 Tmt. G.Radhika
- 9 Thiru. S.Dhanaraj
- 10 Tmt. A.Muthukumari
- 11 Thiru. S.Genghis Khan
- 12 Tmt. M.Ratha
- 13 Thiru. Senthilkumar
- 14 Tmt. L.Anthoniammal
- 15 Tmt. A.Saravana Bhuvaneswari
- 16 Thiru. D.Jeyaraj
- 17 Tmt. P.Rohini
- 18 Thiru. K.E.Navaneetha Krishnan
- 19 Thiru. P.Babu
- 20 Tmt. C.Nagajothi
- 21 Thiru. P.Kajendrakumar
- 22 Tmt. B.Mahalakshmi
- 23 Thiru. T.Kumaravel
- 24 Thiru. J.Manickam
- 25 Thiru. K.Murali Ganesh
- 26 Tmt. K.Chokkayee
- 27 Thiru. A.Mayathevan
- 28 Tmt. R.Uma
- 29 Tmt. R.Logamani
- 30 Tmt. A.Vasanthadevi
- 31 Thiru. V.Murugan
- 32 Tmt. M.Vijaya Moushumi
- 33 Tmt. R.Malathi
- 34 Tmt. J.Pandeeswari
- 35 Tmt. S.Janaki
- 36 Thiru. V.Karthikeyan
- 37 Thiru. N.Ponnuvalavan
- 38 Thiru. T.Kathiravan
- 39 Thiru. P.Marnadu
- 40 Thiru. C.M.Duraipandian
- 41 Thiru. K. Senthamarai Kannan
- 42 Tmt. K.Selvi
- 43 Thiru. M.Mugesh Sharma
- 44 Tmt. K.Tamilselvi
- 45 Tmt. K.Shanmugavalli
- 46 Tmt. P.Vijayalakshmi
- 47 Tmt. M.Banu
- 48 Tmt. K.Rubinikumar
- 49 Thiru. A.Syed Abuthahir
- 50 Tmt. R.Indiragandhi
- 51 Tmt. K.Vijayalakshmi
- 52 Thiru. S.Baskaran
- 53 Thiru. S.Arunkumar
- 54 Tmt. I. Noorjahan
- 55 Tmt. G.Vijaya
- 56 Tmt. V.Jenniammal
- 57 Tmt. V.Indirani
- 58 Thiru. M.Jeyaram
- 59 Tmt. A.Mahalakshmi
- 60 Tmt. S.Bama
- 61 Tmt. S.Selvi
- 62 Thiru. K.Jayachandran
- 63 Thiru. R.Krishnamoorthy
- 64 Thiru. M.Raja
- 65 Thiru. M.Solai Senthil Kumar
- 66 Thiru. N.Marimuthu
- 67 Thiru. D.C.Naganathan
- 68 Thiru. J.Moovendran
- 69 Tmt. A.Saraswathy
- 70 Tmt. T.Amutha
- 71 Thiru. V.Muniyandi
- 72 Thiru. P.Karuppusamy
- 73 Thiru. S.S Bose
- 74 Thiru. V.Sudhan
- 75 Tmt. P.Pandi Selvi
- 76 Thiru. R.Karthick
- 77 Thiru. D.Raj Prathaban
- 78 Tmt. P.Tamilselvi
- 79 Tmt. V.Lakshikka Sree
- 80 Thiru. T.Nagarajan
- 81 Thiru. S.V.Murugan
- 82 Thiru. G.Kaveri
- 83 Thiru. T.Ravi
- 84 Thiru. Bose Muthiah
- 85 Tmt. J.Muthumari
- 86 Tmt. S.Booma
- 87 Thiru. J.Kalidoss
- 88 Tmt. M.Prema
- 89 Tmt. S.Kavitha
- 90 Thiru. G.Rajarathinam
- 91 Thiru. K.A.Vasu
- 92 Thiru. M.Karuppasamy
- 93 Thiru M.P.R Ravichandran
- 94 Tmt R.Swetha Sathyan
- 95 Tmt K.Indira Gandhi
- 96 Tmt N.Vijaya
- 97 Tmt R.Sivasakthi
- 98 Tmt V.Suvitha
- 99 Thiru M.Siva
- 100 Tmt. A.Muthulakshmi

== List of past councillors ==
- Mr.K.P.Sasikumar.M.Com., (2011–2016) – Ward-49
- Pazahakkadai. M.Pandi (1971–1984)
- S.Syed Ismail Sahib (1971–1976)
- Moulvi. Dr. A.S. Afsar Hussain Misbahi (1978–1984)
- S. Alagarsamy naidu (1978–1984) – Father of Vijayakanth
- S.Thajutheen (1978–1984)
- M.C.Kamal (1978–1984)
- M.R.Manikkam (1996–2011)
- S.D.Jayabalan (1996–2016)
- M.Dharmalingam (1996 -2006)
- P. Salaimuthu (2001–2016)
- K.M. Chinnu (1978–1984)
- Siluvai
