= Madurai Lok Sabha constituency =

Parliamentary constituency in Tamil Nadu, India

Coordinates: 9.9°N 78.1°E

Madurai TN-32
- Lok Sabha constituency
- Interactive map of Madurai Loksabha constituency, post-2008 delimitation

Constituency details
- Country: India
- Region: South India
- State: Tamil Nadu
- Assembly constituencies: Melur; Madurai East; Madurai North; Madurai South; Madurai Central; Madurai West
- Established: 1952
- Total electors: 16,41,434
- Reservation: None

Member of Parliament
- 18th Lok Sabha
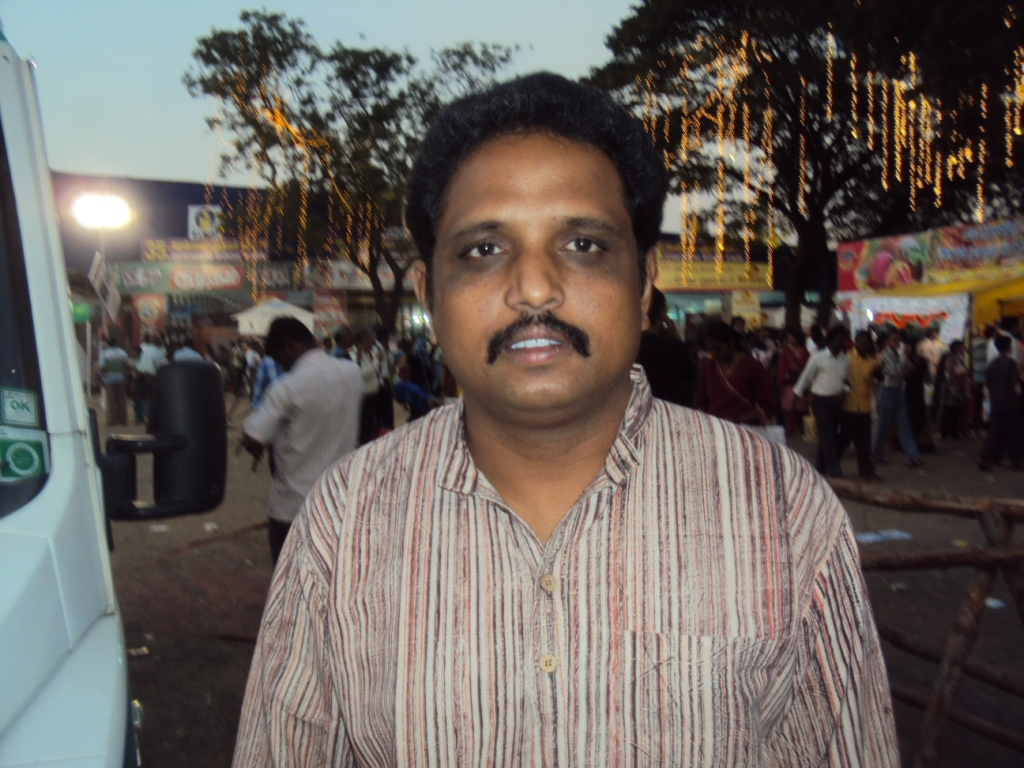
- Incumbent S. Venkatesan
- Party: CPI(M)
- Alliance: INDIA
- Elected year: 2024
- Preceded by: R. Gopalakrishnan

Madurai Lok Sabha constituency (Tamil: மதுரை மக்களவைத் தொகுதி) is one of the 39 Lok Sabha (parliamentary) constituencies in Tamil Nadu, a state in South India. Its Tamil Nadu Parliamentary Constituency number is 32.

== Assembly segments ==
=== 2009-present ===
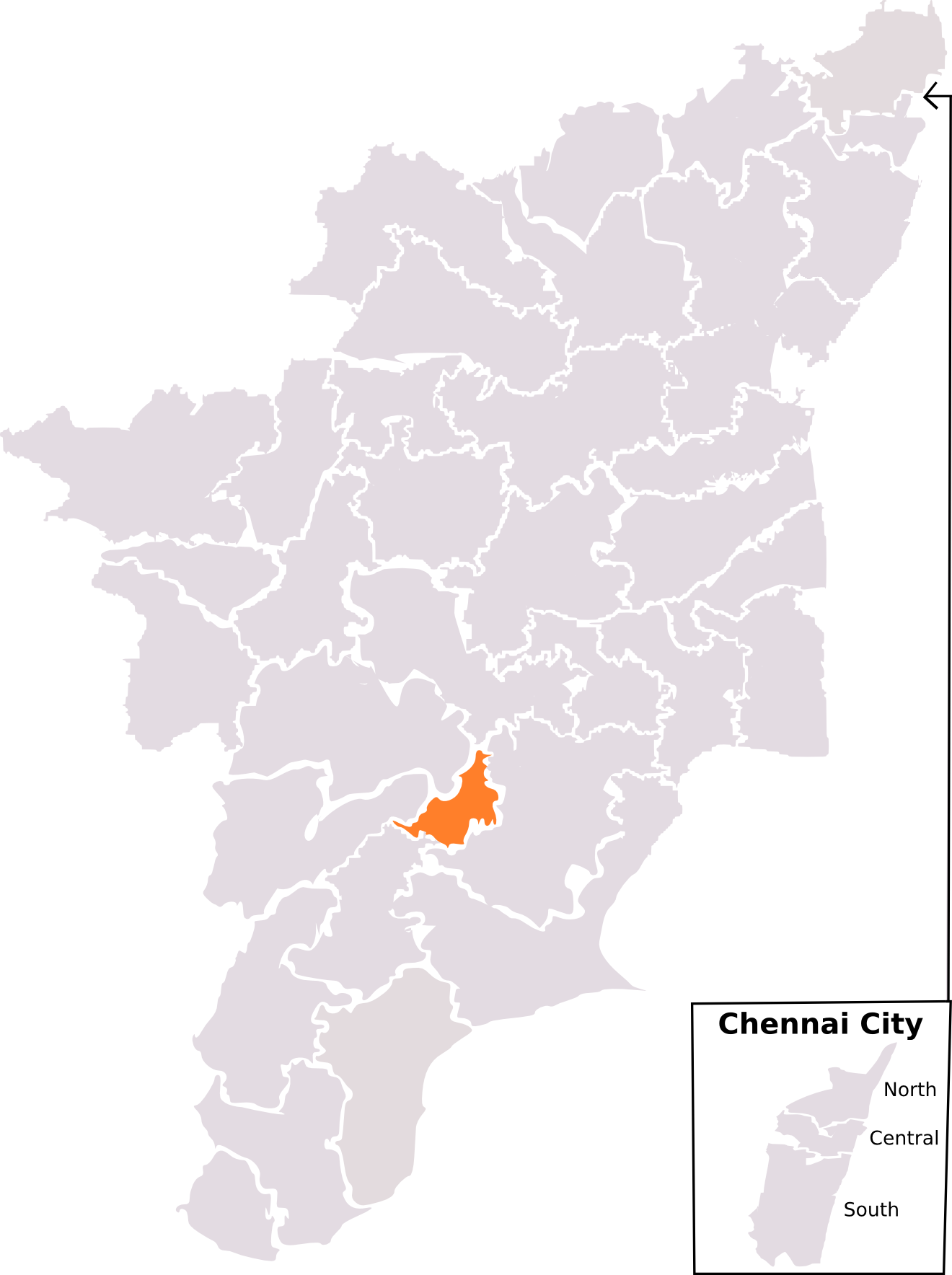
Madurai constituency as laid out by 2008 Delimitation

Constituency number	Name	Reserved for (SC/ST/None)	District	Party	2024 Lead
188	Melur	None	Madurai	INC	CPI(M)
189.	Madurai East	None	Madurai	TVK	CPI(M)
191.	Madurai North	None	Madurai	TVK	CPI(M)
192.	Madurai South	None	Madurai	TVK	CPI(M)
193.	Madurai Central	None	Madurai	TVK	CPI(M)
194.	Madurai West	None	Madurai	TVK	CPI(M)

Before delimitation in 2009, it consisted of the following constituencies:

1. Thiruparankundram (moved to Virudhunagar Constituency)
2. Madurai West
3. Madurai Central
4. Madurai East
5. Samayanallur (SC) (defunct)
6. Melur

== Members of Parliament ==
Year	Name	Party
1952	S. Balasubramaniam Kodimangalam	Indian National Congress
1957	K. T. K. Thangamani	Communist Party of India
1962	N. M. R. Subbaraman	Indian National Congress
1967	P. Ramamurthi	Communist Party of India (Marxist)
1971	R. V. Swaminathan	Indian National Congress
1977	R. V. Swaminathan	Indian National Congress
1980	A. G. Subburaman	Indian National Congress (I)
1984	A. G. Subburaman	Indian National Congress
1989	A. G. S. Ram Babu	Indian National Congress
1991	A. G. S. Ram Babu	Indian National Congress
1996	A. G. S. Ram Babu	Tamil Maanila Congress
1998	Subramanian Swamy	Janata Party
1999	P. Mohan	Communist Party of India (Marxist)
2004	P. Mohan	Communist Party of India (Marxist)
2009	M. K. Azhagiri	Dravida Munnetra Kazhagam
2014	R. Gopalkrishnan	All India Anna Dravida Munnetra Kazhagam
2019	S. Venkatesan	Communist Party of India (Marxist)
2024	S. Venkatesan	Communist Party of India (Marxist)

== Election results ==
Vote share of Winning candidates
2024	43.60%
2019	44.20%
2014	47.51%
2009	54.53%
2004	56.03%
1999	43.85%
1998	40.48%
1996	46.45%
1991	67.62%
1989	64.12%
1984	62.72%
1980	55.57%
1977	62.13%
1971	51.04%
1967	60.18%
1962	39.55%
1957	35.02%
1951	26.68%

=== General Elections 2024 ===
2024 Indian general election: Madurai
Party	Candidate	Votes	%	±%
CPI(M)	S. Venkatesan	430,323	43.60	▼0.60
BJP	Prof. Rama Srinivasan	2,20,914	22.38	New
AIADMK	P. Saravanan	2,04,804	20.75	▼9.67
NOTA	None of the above	11,174	1.13	▼0.47
Margin of victory		2,09,409	21.22	▲7.44
Turnout		9,86,969	62.04	▼4.05
CPI(M) hold		Swing		

=== General Elections 2019 ===
2019 Indian general election: Madurai
Party	Candidate	Votes	%	±%
CPI(M)	S. Venkatesan	447,075	44.20	▲41.04
AIADMK	V. V. R. Raj Satyen	3,07,680	30.42	▼17.10
Independent	K. David Annadurai	85,747	8.48	▲New
MNM	M. Alagar	85,048	8.41	▲New
NOTA	None of the above	16,187	1.60	▼0.47
Margin of victory		1,39,395	13.78	−7.10
Turnout		10,11,500	66.09	▼0.53
Registered electors		15,39,026		6.77
CPI(M) gain from AIADMK		Swing	▼3.32	

=== General Elections 2014 ===
2014 Indian general election: Madurai
Party	Candidate	Votes	%	±%
AIADMK	R. Gopalakrishnan	453,785	47.51	
DMK	V. Velusamy	2,54,361	26.63	−27.90
DMDK	D. Sivamuthu Kumar	1,46,751	15.37	8.49
INC	T. N. Bharath Nachiappan	32,154	3.37	
CPI(M)	B. Vikraman	30,126	3.15	−33.55
NOTA	None of the above	19,765	2.07	
Independent	P. Gopalakrishnan	6,289	0.66	
AAP	M. Kamacis	5,378	0.56	
Independent	V. Andichamy	4,467	0.47	
Margin of victory		1,99,424	20.88	3.06
Turnout		9,55,044	67.74	−11.10
Registered electors		14,41,434		40.98
AIADMK gain from DMK		Swing	-7.02	

=== General Elections 2009 ===
2009 Indian general election: Madurai
Party	Candidate	Votes	%	±%
DMK	M. K. Alagiri	431,295	54.53	
CPI(M)	P. Mohan	2,90,310	36.71	−19.32
DMDK	K. Kaviarasu	54,419	6.88	
Independent	S. Veeradurai	4,712	0.60	
Margin of victory		1,40,985	17.83	−0.13
Turnout		7,90,901	77.43	22.32
Registered electors		10,22,421		−23.93
DMK gain from CPI(M)		Swing	-1.50	

=== General Elections 2004 ===
2004 Indian general election: Madurai
Party	Candidate	Votes	%	±%
CPI(M)	P. Mohan	414,433	56.03	12.17
AIADMK	A. K. Bose	2,81,593	38.07	
JD(U)	P. Sakthivel	12,093	1.63	
JP	Subramanian Swamy	12,009	1.62	
Independent	Pon. Bhaskaran	5,514	0.75	
Independent	N. Mahalingam	5,478	0.74	
Margin of victory		1,32,840	17.96	12.99
Turnout		7,39,680	55.05	2.63
Registered electors		13,44,023		−6.01
CPI(M) hold		Swing	12.17	

=== General Elections 1999 ===
1999 Indian general election: Madurai
Party	Candidate	Votes	%	±%
CPI(M)	P. Mohan	328,204	43.85	27.00
DMK	Pon. Muthuramalingam	2,90,981	38.88	
TMC(M)	A. G. S. Rambabu	89,973	12.02	
JP	Subramanian Swamy	20,489	2.74	
Independent	S. Singarajan	10,625	1.42	
Independent	Dr. M. Meenakshi Sundaram	5,593	0.75	
Margin of victory		37,223	4.97	1.80
Turnout		7,48,404	52.41	−9.86
Registered electors		14,29,975		5.98
CPI(M) gain from JP		Swing	-2.60	

=== General Elections 1998 ===
1998 Indian general election: Madurai
Party	Candidate	Votes	%	±%
JP	Subramanian Swamy	266,202	40.48	
TMC(M)	A. G. S. Ram Babu	2,45,305	37.30	
CPI(M)	P. Mohan	1,10,862	16.86	7.04
INC	D. Pandian	17,507	2.66	−16.53
Independent	Rajini Thirumathi	5,485	0.83	
Independent	S. Ramachandran	4,977	0.76	
Independent	R. Palanisamy	4,764	0.72	
Margin of victory		20,897	3.18	−23.22
Turnout		6,57,651	50.12	−12.16
Registered electors		13,49,265		12.42
JP gain from TMC(M)		Swing	-5.98	

=== General Elections 1996 ===
1996 Indian general election: Madurai
Party	Candidate	Votes	%	±%
TMC(M)	A. G. S. Ram Babu	334,055	46.45	
JP	Subramanian Swamy	1,44,249	20.06	
INC	V. K. Boominathan	1,37,978	19.19	−48.44
CPI(M)	P. Mohan	70,567	9.81	−19.35
BJP	V. Kalaiselvan	13,238	1.84	
Margin of victory		1,89,806	26.40	−12.07
Turnout		7,19,098	62.27	5.46
Registered electors		12,00,197		5.47
TMC(M) gain from INC		Swing	-21.17	

=== General Elections 1991 ===
1991 Indian general election: Madurai
Party	Candidate	Votes	%	±%
INC	A. G. S. Ram Babu	425,769	67.62	3.50
CPI(M)	P. Mohan	1,83,609	29.16	
PMK	R. Tamil Selvan	4,193	0.67	
Margin of victory		2,42,160	38.46	8.43
Turnout		6,29,609	56.81	−6.46
Registered electors		11,37,905		0.04
INC hold		Swing	3.50	

=== General Elections 1989 ===
1989 Indian general election: Madurai
Party	Candidate	Votes	%	±%
INC	A. G. S. Ram Babu	456,442	64.12	1.40
DMK	V. Velusamy	2,42,664	34.09	
Margin of victory		2,13,778	30.03	0.38
Turnout		7,11,843	63.27	−7.69
Registered electors		11,37,434		32.83
INC hold		Swing	1.40	

=== General Elections 1984 ===
1984 Indian general election: Madurai
Party	Candidate	Votes	%	±%
INC	A. G. Subburaman	365,948	62.72	
CPI(M)	N. Sankariah	1,92,937	33.07	−9.35
Independent	P. V. Kanthaswamy	11,157	1.91	
Independent	J. S. Krishnan Janak	4,907	0.84	
Margin of victory		1,73,011	29.65	16.50
Turnout		5,83,444	70.96	3.32
Registered electors		8,56,315		8.61
INC gain from INC(I)		Swing	7.16	

=== General Elections 1980 ===
1980 Indian general election: Madurai
Party	Candidate	Votes	%	±%
INC(I)	A. G. Subburaman	292,380	55.57	
CPI(M)	A. Balasumbramaniam	2,23,185	42.42	8.17
Independent	P. Sundararaj Thevar	5,046	0.96	
Independent	J. S. Krishnan Janak	2,588	0.49	
Margin of victory		69,195	13.15	−14.74
Turnout		5,26,182	67.64	3.39
Registered electors		7,88,417		3.58
INC(I) gain from INC		Swing	-6.56	

=== General Elections 1977 ===
1977 Indian general election: Madurai
Party	Candidate	Votes	%	±%
INC	R. V. Swaminathan	299,309	62.13	11.09
CPI(M)	P. Ramamurthi	1,64,964	34.24	20.54
Independent	S. Muthumaya Thevar	9,257	1.92	
Independent	J. S. Krishnan Janak	3,809	0.79	
Independent	B. Brabahara Singh	2,656	0.55	
Margin of victory		1,34,345	27.89	11.62
Turnout		4,81,771	64.25	−7.09
Registered electors		7,61,202		15.82
INC hold		Swing	11.09	

=== General Elections 1971 ===
1971 Indian general election: Madurai
Party	Candidate	Votes	%	±%
INC	R. V. Swaminathan	227,060	51.04	15.14
INC(O)	S. Chinna Karuppa Thevar	1,54,701	34.77	
CPI(M)	P. Ramamurthi	60,935	13.70	−46.48
Independent	A. Sirpada Rao	2,200	0.49	
Margin of victory		72,359	16.26	−8.02
Turnout		4,44,896	71.34	−6.71
Registered electors		6,57,203		14.80
INC gain from CPI(M)		Swing	-9.14	

=== General Elections 1967 ===
1967 Indian general election: Madurai
Party	Candidate	Votes	%	±%
CPI(M)	P. Ramamurthi	261,390	60.18	
INC	S. Chinna Karuppa Thevar	1,55,922	35.90	−3.66
ABJS	T. K. T. Ram	17,062	3.93	
Margin of victory		1,05,468	24.28	19.44
Turnout		4,34,374	78.05	3.22
Registered electors		5,72,490		17.48
CPI(M) gain from INC		Swing	20.62	

=== General Elections 1962 ===
1962 Indian general election: Madurai
Party	Candidate	Votes	%	±%
INC	N. M. R. Subbaraman	140,574	39.55	5.01
CPI	K. T. K. Thangamani	1,23,386	34.72	−0.30
SWA	S. S. Mariswami	91,459	25.73	
Margin of victory		17,188	4.84	4.36
Turnout		3,55,419	74.83	25.61
Registered electors		4,87,321		5.83
INC gain from CPI		Swing	4.53	

=== General Elections 1957 ===
1957 Indian general election: Madurai
Party	Candidate	Votes	%	±%
CPI	K. T. K. Thangamani	79,374	35.02	▲21.93
INC	T. K. Rama	78,286	34.54	▼7.86
Independent	Sasivarna Thevar	64,765	28.57	
Independent	Venkatarama Iyer	4,249	1.87	
Margin of victory		1,088	0.48	−0.31
Turnout		2,26,674	49.22	−47.67
Registered electors		4,60,493		−39.19
CPI gain from INC		Swing	8.34	

=== General Elections 1951 ===
1951–52 Indian general election: Madurai
Party	Candidate	Votes	%	±%
INC	S. Balasubramaniam	195,762	26.68	
INC	P. M. Kakkan	1,89,945	25.89	
CPI	Thangamani Nadar	96,036	13.09	
SP	S. A. Rahim	68,019	9.27	
AIFB	Sargent	58,552	7.98	
KMPP	Kariamuthu Thiagarajan	51,300	6.99	
RPI	G. Arulappan	44,341	6.04	
TTP	Arjunan	16,874	2.30	
Independent	V. S. Venkatarama Iyer	12,933	1.76	
Margin of victory		5,817	0.79	
Turnout		7,33,762	96.90	
Registered electors		7,57,254		0.00
INC win (new seat)				

== See also ==
- Madurai
- List of constituencies of the Lok Sabha
