= Subramanian Swamy =

Indian politician (born 1939)

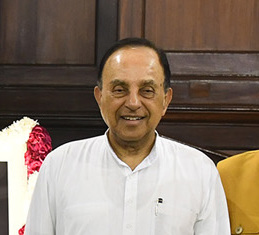
- Swamy in 2019

Member of Parliament, Rajya Sabha
- In office 25 April 2016 – 24 April 2022
- Constituency: Nominated
- In office 3 April 1988 – 2 April 1994
- Constituency: Uttar Pradesh
- In office 3 April 1974 – 15 November 1977
- Constituency: Uttar Pradesh

Union Minister of Commerce and Industry
- In office 10 November 1990 – 21 June 1991
- Prime Minister: Chandra Shekhar

Union Minister of Law and Justice
- In office 10 November 1990 – 21 June 1991
- Prime Minister: Chandra Shekhar
- Preceded by: Dinesh Goswami
- Succeeded by: Kotla Vijaya Bhaskara Reddy

Member of Parliament, Lok Sabha
- In office 10 March 1998 – 26 April 1999
- Preceded by: A. G. S. Ram Babu
- Succeeded by: P. Mohan
- Constituency: Madurai, Tamil Nadu
- In office 1977–1984
- Preceded by: Rajaram Gopal Kulkarni
- Succeeded by: Gurudas Kamat
- Constituency: Mumbai North East, Maharashtra

President of Janata Party
- In office 1990–2013

Personal details
- Born: 15 September 1939 (age 87) Mylapore, Madras Presidency, British India (present-day Tamil Nadu, India)
- Party: Bharatiya Janata Party (2013–present)
- Other political affiliations: Bharatiya Jana Sangh (1974–1977); Janata Party (1977–2003; 2003–2013); All India Progressive Janata Dal (2003)
- Spouse: Roxna Swamy (m. 1966)
- Children: Gitanjali Swamy (daughter); Suhasini Haidar (daughter)
- Relatives: Coomi Kapoor (sister-in-law); Sanjay Sarma (son-in-law); Salman Haidar (co-father-in-law)
- Education: University of Delhi (BA); Indian Statistical Institute (MStat); Harvard University (PhD)
- Occupation: Politician; economist; statistician
- Website: Official Blog

Subramanian Swamy (born 15 September 1939) is an Indian politician, economist and statistician. Before joining politics, he was a professor of Mathematical Economics at the Indian Institute of Technology, Delhi. He is known for his Hindu nationalist views. Swamy was a member of the Planning Commission of India and was a Cabinet Minister in the Chandra Shekhar government. Between 1994 and 1996, Swamy was Chairman of the Commission on Labour Standards and International Trade under former Prime Minister P. V. Narasimha Rao. Swamy was a long-time member of the Janata Party, serving as its president until 2013 when he joined the Bharatiya Janata Party (BJP). He has written on foreign affairs of India dealing largely with China, Pakistan and Israel. He was nominated to Rajya Sabha on 25 April 2016 for a six-year term, ending on 24 April 2022.

== Family and education ==
Subramanian Swamy was born on 15 September 1939, in Mylapore, Chennai, Tamil Nadu, India, to a family which hailed originally from Mullipallam, Sholavandan, Madurai in Tamil Nadu in a Vadadesa Vadama Tamil Brahmin family. His father, Sitaraman Subramanian, was a bureaucrat and his mother, Padmavathi, was a homemaker. He has one younger brother, Ram Subramanian, as well as two younger sisters.

Sitaraman Subramanian was an officer in the Indian Statistical Service who served as the director of the Central Statistical Institute in Delhi, and was a statistical adviser to the Government of India. The family, which hailed from Madurai in Tamil Nadu, moved to New Delhi when Swamy was only six months old. Due to his father's job and the family's Tamil roots, major national leaders like K. Kamaraj, C. Rajagopalachari and S. Satyamurti often visited Sitaraman.

=== Education ===
He attended Hindu College, University of Delhi, from where he earned his bachelor's degree in Mathematics. He then took his master's degree in Statistics from the Indian Statistical Institute, Kolkata. He was later recommended by Hendrik S. Houthakker and went to study at Harvard University on a full Rockefeller scholarship, where he received his PhD in Economics in 1965, with his thesis titled Economic Growth and Income Distribution in a Developing Nation. His thesis adviser was Nobel laureate Simon Kuznets. While he was a doctoral student at Harvard, he attended Massachusetts Institute of Technology as a cross-registered student and later worked at the United Nations Secretariat in New York City as an Assistant Economics Affairs Officer in 1963. He subsequently worked as a resident tutor at Lowell House at Harvard University.

=== Family and personal life ===
Swamy met Roxna Swamy (née Kapadia), whose father was member of Indian Civil Service (British India), an Indian lady of Parsi ethnicity who was studying PhD in mathematics at Harvard University. They were married in June 1966. Journalist Coomi Kapoor is his sister-in-law. Swamy has two daughters. The elder daughter, Gitanjali Swamy, is an entrepreneur and private equity professional. She is married to Sanjay Sarma, a professor at MIT, who is the son of E.A.S Sarma, a retired IAS officer and former secretary of Economic Affairs to the government of India. The younger daughter, Suhasini Haidar, is a print and television journalist married to Nadeem Haidar, the son of former Indian Foreign Secretary Salman Haidar.

=== Academic career ===
In July 1965, immediately after obtaining his PhD in economics from Harvard, Swamy joined the Department of Economics at the Harvard Faculty of Arts and Sciences as an assistant professor. in 1969, he was made an associate professor. As an associate professor, he was invited by Amartya Sen to occupy the chair on Chinese studies at the Delhi School of Economics. He accepted the offer and even travelled to India to take up the position, but his appointment was cancelled at the last minute due to his views on India's economic policy and also its nuclear policy. at that time, India was still partially oriented towards socialism and the "command economy" model instituted by Nehru, and Swamy was a believer in market economy.

Thereafter, Swamy moved to the Indian Institute of Technology, Delhi where he was a full Professor of Mathematical Economics there from 1969 to the early 1970s. He was removed from the position by its board of governors in the early 1970s because of his disapproval of Indira Gandhi's poor economic policies but was legally reinstated in the late 1990s by the Supreme Court of India. He continued in the position until 1991 when he resigned to become a cabinet minister. He served on the Board of Governors of the IIT, Delhi (1977–80) and on the Council of IITs (1980–82). He also taught economics courses at Harvard Summer School until 2011, when the Harvard faculty voted to eliminate Swamy's courses as a result of his "offensive" statements about Muslims.

Swamy currently serves as Chairman of the Board of Governors of the SCMS Group of Institutions, which includes the SCMS Cochin School of Business in Kochi.

== Political career ==
=== Early politics ===
Swamy's career started with his involvement in the Sarvodaya movement, which was an apolitical movement but which formed the foundation of the creation of Janata Party later. The real turn in his political career came after his sacking from IIT. Liberal economic policies put forward by him did not go well with the then Prime Minister Indira Gandhi who sneered at his plans as 'Santa Claus with unrealistic ideas'. He was later expelled from the Indian Institute of Technology Delhi. This marked the beginning of his active political career. As a staunch opponent of Indira Gandhi, the opposition part, Bharatiya Jana Sangh sent him to Rajya Sabha – the upper house of Indian Parliament.

He was an elected Member of Lok sabha, the lower house of Indian Parliament five times between 1974 and 1999. As a Lok Sabha member, he represented the city of Mumbai North East twice (1977 and 1980) and later the city of Madurai (1998). As a Rajya Sabha member, herepresented Uttar Pradesh (1974) in the Parliament.

=== During the Emergency (1975–1977) ===
During the period of the Emergency, he fled to the United States, seeking haven with an Indian businessman in Michigan who had become the spokesperson of the opposition in the United States. In 1976, when the Emergency was still in force and an arrest warrant had been issued in his name, Swamy came to Parliament to attend the session and managed to escape India after the session was adjourned. This act of defiance was well received in the eyes of opposition parties.

=== In Janata Party ===
In 1981, he along with Harish Rawat and 13 others led first pilgrimage to Kailash–Manasarovar after 1962 Sino-Indian War. In 1984, Swamy stated his opinion that Janata Party should focus on organisational levels of the party. In February 1984, he filed his nomination for Janata Party President against Chandra Shekhar, but lost. In the same year, 1984, Swamy was expelled from Janata Party after he levelled allegations against Chandra Shekhar that Shekhar had manipulated the Janata Party presidency election. Subsequently, he joined Lok Dal, party of former Prime Minister Charan Singh. He fought 1984 Lok Sabha election from Mumbai North East Lok Sabha constituency on Lok Dal ticket, but lost.

In May 1988, Lok Dal (A) was merged with Janata Party with Ajit Singh as its president and Swamy became general secretary of Janata Party. Later in October 1988, Janata Dal was formed by merging major opposition parties with Janata Party one of its constituent. But Swamy along with Indubhai Patel, H. D. Deve Gowda, Syed Shahabuddin, Sarojini Mahishi refused to accept the merger of Janata Party into Janata Dal and remained in Janata Party. In December 1990, he was elected as president of Janata Party by Central Parliamentary Board.

=== Electoral history ===
- 1974–1976—Member of Rajya Sabha from Uttar Pradesh, elected on a Jan Sangh party ticket
- 1977–1980—Member of Lok Sabha from Mumbai North-East, elected on a Janata Party ticket
- 1980–1984—Member of Lok Sabha from Mumbai North-East, elected on a Janata Party ticket
- 1988–1994—Member of Rajya Sabha from Uttar Pradesh, elected on a Janata Party ticket
- 1998–1999—Member of Lok Sabha from Madurai, elected on a Janata Party ticket
- 2016–2022—Member of Rajya Sabha, Nominated Category

=== Minister of Commerce and Law of India (1990–1991) ===
During 1990 and 1991, Swamy served as a member of the Planning Commission of India and as Cabinet Minister of Commerce and Law. On 27 December 1990, Financial Times published an interview of Swamy by David Housego in which he claimed that the decision to raise import duties by his government is a "panic reaction". In Parliament Prime Minister Chandra Shekhar claimed that Swamy had denied what had been attributed to him in the article, but David Housego who wrote the story stood firmly by it.

Swamy along with Commerce Secretary Montek Singh Ahluwalia decided to build Trade Policy 1991-92 which would get rid of import licencing for a wide range of import and allow these items to be imported freely against licences earned by exporters. This policy was to be announced in April 1991 but Chandra Shekhar government was pulled down.

== Later years ==
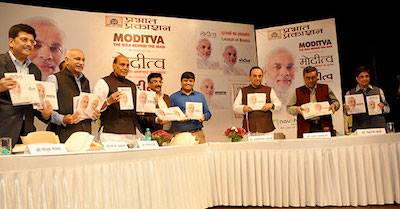
Swamy at launching a book with BJP members in 2014.

Between 1994 and 1996, Swamy was chairman of the Commission on Labour Standards and International Trade (equivalent in rank to a cabinet minister) under Prime Minister P. V. Narasimha Rao. In 1997, he filed a petition against P. Chidambaram in Delhi High Court, which alleged that Chidambaram had violated Prevention of Corruption Act while purchasing shares of Fairgrowth Financial Services Limited in 1991. But in 1998, Delhi High Court dismissed his petition under technical grounds.

During 1998 general election, Swamy formed an alliance with J. Jayalalithaa's AIADMK and won from Madurai constituency. One year later, on 29 March 1999, Swamy organised a tea party to bring various opposition leaders together. This meeting was attended by various leaders like Chandra Shekhar, P. V. Narasimha Rao, H. D. Deve Gowda, J. Jayalalithaa, Manmohan Singh, Sonia Gandhi etc. This led to AIADMK's withdrawal from NDA coalition government and the government lost the majority in the Lok Sabha.

On 15 May 2004, Swamy wrote a letter to President A. P. J. Abdul Kalam raising doubt whether Sonia Gandhi can become Prime Minister of India citing Section 5 of Citizenship Act, 1955.

He continued to be president of the Janata Party till 2013. On 11 August 2013, Swamy officially joined the BJP when its president was Rajnath Singh. His admission to the party would mark the merger of the Janata Party with the Bharatiya Janata Party.

On 8 April 2015, Swamy formed Virat Hindustan Sangam, a right-wing cultural organisation to push issues like building Ram Mandir, scrapping Article 370 and bringing Uniform Civil Code. He was nominated by president to Rajya Sabha in 2016.

== Elections contested ==
=== Lok Sabha ===
Year	Constituency	Party	Votes	%	Opponent		Votes	%	Result	Margin
1977	Mumbai North East	JP	260,699	61.34	INC	Kulkarni Rajaram Alias Raja Gopal	137,577	32.37	Won	123,122
1980	Mumbai North East	JP	199,472	40.00	INC	D. N. Chaulkar	160,566	32.20	Won	38,906
1984	Mumbai North East	LKD	13,924	2.17	INC	Gurudas Kamat	273,847	42.62	Lost	-259,923
1996	Madurai	JP	144,249	20.06	TMC(M)	A. G. S. Ram Babu	334.055	46.45	Lost	-1,89,806
1998	Madurai	JP	266,202	40.48	TMC(M)	A. G. S. Ram Babu	245,305	37.30	Won	20,897
1999	Madurai	JP	20,489	2.74	CPI(M)	P. Mohan	328,204	43.85	Lost	-3,07,715
2004	Madurai	JP	12,009	1.62	CPI(M)	P. Mohan	414,433	56.03	Lost	-4,02,424

=== Rajya Sabha ===
Position	Party	Constituency	From	To	Tenure
Member of Parliament, Rajya Sabha (1st Term)	ABJS	Uttar Pradesh	3 April 1974	15 November 1976	2 years, 226 days
Member of Parliament, Rajya Sabha (2nd Term)	JP	Uttar Pradesh	3 April 1988	2 April 1994	5 years, 364 days
Member of Parliament, Rajya Sabha (3rd Term)	BJP	Nominated	25 April 2016	24 April 2022	5 years, 364 days

== Court petitions and allegations ==
=== Complaint against Jayalalithaa ===
In 1996, Swamy had filed a criminal complaint against Jayalalithaa which led to her prosecution, conviction and sentencing to four years imprisonment by the trial court in 2014. Later, on 11 May 2015, a special Bench of the Karnataka High Court set aside the trial court order convicting former Tamil Nadu Chief Minister Jayalalitha, who was acquitted of all charges in the disproportionate assets case. An Appeal against the High court verdict was filed in Supreme Court. The final verdict of Supreme Court came in February 2017 that indicted Jayalalitha posthumously and upheld the trial court judgement in toto.

=== Phone tapping allegation ===
Swamy released a letter alleging that former intelligence chief had asked DoT to tap the phone of many politicians and businessmen in Karnataka when Ramakrishna Hegde, the then Chief Minister, resigned in 1988. Hegde then filed a case against him in 1989 and 1990.

=== Hashimpura massacre ===
In 1987, when Muslim youths were killed under police custody, Swamy spoke against it and sat on a fast for more than a week in Jantar Mantar demanding the institution of an inquiry. After 25 years he started pursuing the case once again in court.

Rebecca John, a counsel for the Hashimpura complainants, told Additional Sessions Judge Rakesh Siddhartha who is conducting the trial in the case, that "there is no other motive than politics behind Swamy's plea for further investigation and it would only further delay the trial".

=== Role in exposing 2G spectrum case ===
In November 2008, Swamy amongst others wrote the first of five letters to Prime Minister Manmohan Singh seeking permission to prosecute A. Raja in regard to 2G spectrum case. After not receiving any response, Swamy decided to file a case on his own in the Supreme Court of India regarding the matter, which then asked the Central Bureau of Investigation to produce a detailed report on it. He further called on the Indian government to re-auction the 2G spectrum without the involvement of Communications Minister Kapil Sibal.

On 15 April 2011, he filed a 206-page petition with PM Singh seeking permission to prosecute Sonia Gandhi on charges of corruption. He also raised doubts regarding her acquisition of Indian citizenship. Swamy filed documents in the court to prosecute Minister of Home Affairs P. Chidambaram by including a 15 January 2008 letter written by Chidambaram to Prime Minister Manmohan Singh. Swamy also placed on record the certified copy of the minutes of a meeting between Chidambaram, Raja and the prime minister during the tenure of Raja as the MOC&IT. Since criminal charges were filed against the accused, but no evidence was given by Swamy or the CBI, all the respondents have got bail as of July 2012.

==== Sanction to prosecute telecom minister A. Raja ====
On 31 January 2012, the Supreme Court of India accepted Swamy's petition against the Prime Minister's Office in the 2G case, saying that all public authorities should give a sanction within three months against any public official if a request is made for prosecution.

The Supreme Court said that Swamy had the locus standi to seek sanction from the Prime Minister for the prosecution of A. Raja in the 2G case. Sanction by a competent authority for the prosecution of a public servant has to be granted within a time frame, the apex court said. Justice AK Ganguly said that the sanction would be deemed to be granted if competent authority failed to take a decision within four months.

Swamy's arguments were that he wrote to the PMO on 29 November 2008, but it was only on 19 March 2010 the PMO replied that the plea made by Swamy was "premature" as investigation was being carried out by the Central Bureau of Investigation (CBI).Raja was arrested by the CBI in the case and got bail on 15 May 2012 after spending nearly 15 months in the Tihar Central Jail.

On 21 December 2017, the special CBI Court Judge acquitted the accused including A. Raja.

=== Petition to strike down "single directive provision" ===
In 1997, Swamy filed a petition in the Supreme Court of India to strike down a provision which barred CBI from investigating corruption charges against officers of the rank of joint secretary and above without prior permission of the Government of India called as "Dr. Subramanian Swamy Versus Director, Central Bureau of Investigation & Anr." on 6 May 2014, a five-judge constitution bench held the single directive provision as invalid and unconstitutional. The court said that "Protection of prior approval for probing graft charges against officers at level of joint secretary and above has propensity of shielding corruption." Incumbent CBI Director Ranjit Sinha welcomed the judgement and said, "now a very heavy responsibility has been cast upon us to ensure that no innocent civil-servant is harassed."

=== Investigation on EVM ===
Swamy demanded that an independent committee should be formed to check the security and safety of the Electronic Voting Machines (EVM) to avoid any rigging or tampering. He demanded that a printed receipt should be given to every voter after casting the vote. His PIL to investigate the working of EVM was dismissed by the Delhi High Court on 17 January 2012. The court refused to give any direction to the Election Commission to bring back paper-ballot system or use of printed receipts. The Commission argued that the use of paper is not feasible due to the huge size of Indian electorate. The court further asked the Election Commission to "immediately begin a process of wider consultations" and the Parliament "to go into this question in depth and decide".

On 22 January 2013 the Election Commission informed the Supreme Court that it would include Voter Verifiable Paper Audit Trail (VVPAT) system which is in the testing phase after the court agreed with some points raised by Swamy who was the contender, in the machines so that every voter will come to know who he/she is voting by getting a printed slip after pressing the EVM button. The voter paper audit trail has then been in use from 4 September 2013.

On 8 October 2013 the Supreme Court directed the Election Commission to implement audit trail system in 2014 general election in phases.

=== National Herald case ===
On 1 November 2012 Swamy alleged that both Sonia and Rahul Gandhi have committed fraud and land grabbing to a tune of ₹20 billion (US$210 million) by acquiring a public ltd company called Associated Journals Private Ltd (AJPL) through their owned private company, Young Indian which was formed on 23 November 2010. Through this they had got publication rights of National Herald and Qaumi Awaz newspapers, with real estate properties in Delhi and Uttar Pradesh. The acquired place was intended only for newspaper purposes but were used for running a passport office, amounting to crores of rupees, it alleges. Swamy further added that Rahul Gandhi hid the facts in his affidavit while filing nomination for the 2009 Lok Sabha elections.

It further alleges that on 26 February 2011 AJPL approved the transfer of unsecured loan of ₹900 million (US$9.3 million) from the All India Congress Committee at zero interest. Swamy argued that it is illegal for any political party to lend the loan as per violation of Section 269T of Income Tax Act 1961. on 2 November, the party responded that the loan was given only for reviving the National Herald newspaper with no commercial interest. Swamy decided to approach the Supreme Court for de-recognising the Congress party, while the Election Commission ordered the probe on 17 November 2012.

The hearing of the case had been taken up thereafter on different occasions with the court observing prima facie evidence against all the accused. on 1 August 2014 the Enforcement Directorate initiated probe to find any money laundering in the case while on the same day Swamy was served notice by the High Court. on 28 August the metropolitan court fixed 9 December for the next hearing of the case, while on 12 January 2015 the judge of the Delhi High Court recused himself from hearing the case stating that schedule of cases has been changed and directed that the petitions be directed before an appropriate bench. on 27 January 2015, the Supreme Court asked Swamy to make out a case for the speedy trial in the Delhi High Court since the petition cannot be heard directly.

On 18 September 2015 it was reported that the Enforcement Directorate had reopened the investigation. Following it, on 19 December 2015 Patiala House Court granted unconditional bail immediately on the hearing to all the five accused but one. on 12 July 2016 the Delhi High Court set aside the trial court order of 11 January and 11 March based on plea by Swamy to examine balance sheets of Congress party, AJL and Young Indian from 2010 to 2013, and fixed the date of next hearing on 20 August. Currently, the case proceedings are on-going in Delhi High Court.

=== Temple cases ===
==== Nataraja temple case ====
Swamy had filed a petition in the Supreme Court with priests of the Dikshitar sect challenging the decision of the Madras High Court on transferring the administration of the Nataraja temple to the then Tamil Nadu government in 2009.

Swamy on referring to the provisions of Tamil Nadu Hindu Religious and Charitable Endowments Act, contended that Podu Dikshitars have right to administer the temple and argued on handing over the administration on mismanagement grounds of temple's wealth is violation under Article 26 of the Constitution of India. on 6 January 2014 the Supreme Court ruled that the administration is to be handed over back to the priests of the temple from the state government.

==== State control of Hindu temples ====
Subramanian Swamy filed a petition to remove Kerala State government's control over Hindu temples by abolishing Devaswom. In 2018, the Supreme Court agreed to examine the petition moved by him and TG Mohan Das to abolish Devaswom Board. The Supreme Court issued notice to the Kerala government and Devaswom Board of Travanacore and Cochin and sought their response in six weeks. In 2019, the Kerala government opposed Subramanian Swamy's plea.

==== Ayodhya temple case ====
On 22 February 2016, Swamy filed a petition in the Supreme Court allowing construction of Rama temple at the disputed site where Babri Masjid was demolished in 1992, and expediting the adjudication related to order of the Allahabad High Court on 30 September 2010, petition was accepted on 26 February to be later heard by the court.

==== Uttarakhand Char Dham Devasthanam Management Act, 2019 ====
In February 2020, Subramanian Swamy filed a public interest litigation in Uttarakhand High Court against newly framed law to govern Char Dham and 51 other temples of the state. Swamy in his PIL, requested the court to declare the Uttarakhand Char Dham Devasthanam Management Act, 2019 'unconstitutional' which was passed in the legislative assembly of Uttarakhand in December 2019. But the Uttarakhand High Court upheld the constitutionality of the Uttarakhand Char Dham Devasthanam Management Act, 2019, dismissing the public interest litigation filed by Subramanian Swamy and Sri 5 Mandir Samiti Gangotri Dham and another. However, the Court read down Section 22 of the Act, which was about the acquisition of land for the Char Dham.

=== Personal allegations against Narendra Modi ===
Swamy has been making allegations related with personal conduct against Indian Prime Minister Narendra Modi. He has also made repeated public comments against Modi in the light of the Epstein case, which has often led to public controversy. Lately, Modi's biographer Madhu Kishwar also joined the fray, making similar allegations. The BJP has strongly refuted these allegations, with a BJP member filing complaint case in Varanasi Court against such allegations.

== Political positions ==
=== Foreign policy ===
==== China ====
Swamy has worked towards normalising relations between China and India. According to Swamy, the re-opening of the Kailash Mansarovar pilgrimage route was announced at a meeting convened by the People's Republic of China paramount leader Deng Xiaoping in April 1981, in which Swamy was in attendance.

==== Israel ====
In various speeches and articles, Swamy has expressed his admiration for, and solidarity with, the State of Israel and has credited its retaliatory capacity for its ability to survive as a nation in a hostile Arab environment. Swamy made pioneering efforts towards India's establishment of diplomatic relations with Israel.

==== Sri Lanka and LTTE ====
Swamy, on several occasions, has voiced support for the state of Sri Lanka in its role during Sri Lanka's protracted civil war with the LTTE, for which he was criticised as "pro Lanka" by his political opponents domestically. in an interview given to The Sunday Leader newspaper, Swamy stated that the Indian government should attend the CHOGM meeting held in Colombo despite stiff opposition from Indian politicians in Tamil Nadu concerned for the welfare and human rights of Tamils in Sri Lanka, placing the onus on the LTTE for human rights violations during the Sri Lankan civil war, he had favoured Mahinda Rajapaksa also during Sri Lanka 2015 election.

==== United States ====
Swamy is a strong supporter of former U.S. President Donald Trump, endorsing Trump's presidential candidacy in 2016 and comparing Trump to himself.

After the Charlottesville riots in August 2017, he posted a tweet urging Indians residing in the United States to "stand with Trump at this hour of his being hunted by cockeyed liberals & Left wing loonies on racism" and praised Trump for "having showed the hypocrites their place by telling it like it is."

Following criticism of Pakistan by Trump, Swamy called for closer relations between India and the United States.

=== Domestic policy ===
==== Kodava Council in Kodagu ====
Since at least 2017, Subramanian Swamy has supported CNC's demand for a Codava Autonomous Region (CAR) and a Codava Development Council for the Kodava tribe in the Kodagu district of Karnataka. Swamy discussed the idea of an autonomous development council for the Kodavas with H N Ananth Kumar in 2018 in the presence of Amit Shah and Rajnath Singh and wrote a letter to Karnataka's CM B S Yediyurappa seeking implementation of the demand in 2019. In 2023, his PIL filed on behalf of CNC caused the High Court to order issue of notice to the State and Central Governments to set up a commission to examine the demand for geo-political autonomy for the Kodava tribe.

==== Cow ====
In March 2017, he brought a private member's bill to punish cow slaughter in India with capital punishment.

==== LGBT rights ====
In 2018, when the Indian Supreme Court decriminalized gay sexual acts, Swamy criticised the ruling, saying "It could give rise to an increase in the number of HIV cases."

==== Kashmir ====
In September 2008, Swamy stridently retorted against the contentions of some Indian columnists who voiced their opinions in favor of "peacefully" surrendering Kashmir to Pakistan(source?). He said,

"I would say that the silent suffering majority of India wants none of this. The 'Kashmir issue,' in fact, can no more be solved by dialogue either with the Pakistanis or the Hurriyat, leave alone the constitutional impossibility of allowing it to secede. [...]Kashmir, in fact, is now our defining identity. It is a touchstone for our resolve to preserve our national integrity. The population of that State may be majority Muslim but the land and its history is predominantly Hindu. for our commitment to the survival of the ancient civilisation of India and the composite culture that secularists talk of, we have not only to win that coming inevitable war but also resolve never to part with Kashmir. [...]

Pakistanis often cite the United Nations resolutions on Kashmir to argue for a plebiscite. This obfuscates the fact of accession of the State to India. The legality of the Instrument of Accession signed in favour of India by the then Maharaja of J&K, Hari Singh, on 26 October 1947 has to prevail anyway.

==== Tamil Nadu politics ====
Swamy is well known for his critical views against the "Aryan versus Dravidian" politics of Periyar E. V. Ramasamy, calling it as the theory forwarded by the British. He has been a staunch opponent of the armed rebel group Liberation Tigers of Tamil Eelam. He also urged the Indian government not to support the US led resolution condemning war crimes in the Sri Lankan Civil War, citing it as one-sided and not in the interest of India. Swamy moved the court and got the order restoring quota for Sri Lankan Tamil refugees in colleges in the state.

Swamy obtained Supreme Court Stay against the implementation of Sethusamudram Shipping Canal Project (SSCP). He believes that it would hurt the sentiments of people who believe that this shallow land connecting between Tamil Nadu and Sri Lanka was built by Lord Rama. He strongly opposes the implementation of SSCP citing that implementing this scheme will be a criminal offence under section 295 Indian Penal Code. He wrote letters to Prime Minister of India in June 2009 asking him to stop the project and had informed the Supreme Court on 14 October 2015 that the government may not continue with the Sethusamudram Project.

=== Hindu nationalism ===
Swamy has made several statements in the past that reflect on his Hindu nationalist position. He has called for the creation of an "enlightened secular democracy which redresses all historical wrongs done to Hindus." He has claimed that India is the world's most ancient civilization that consists of "an organic cultural core which is Hindu in character." He has also claimed that the Hindu foundation of India is what makes India distinctive in the world.

=== Muslims ===
After the 2011 Mumbai bombings, he wrote a controversial editorial wherein, as a response to Islamic terrorism, he called for the removal of 300 mosques built at sites of Hindu temples. and for the disenfranchisement of Muslims unless they "acknowledge that their ancestors were Hindus". After the Faculty of Arts and Sciences at Harvard voted to have his classes removed for "demonising" Muslims, his regular Harvard summer teaching sessions were cancelled because of this article.

In a 2020 Vice interview, he stated that under the Indian constitution, "Article 14 guarantees equality of equals" and that "there is no such thing as equal rights, they [Muslim immigrants] are not in an equal category." He added, "We know that where the Muslim population is large, there is always trouble." He later claimed that this had been misinterpreted in a tweet stating, "One fake quote is that I had declared Muslims are not equal to Hindus under Art. 14."

=== Punjab Politics ===
Swamy had been sent to the Golden Temple to settle with Jarnail Singh Bhindranwale in 1984, he was greeted and had good relations with him. Swamy stated that Bhindranwale had wanted to come to a non-violent solution to the issues that Punjab had, and Bhindranwale condemned the terrorism and violent incidents that happened prior to the operation. Swamy also condemned the needless military action and use of the Indian Army in a political battle between the Congress and the Akali protests- he believed, since Bhindranwale was staunchly anti-Communist, the Soviet Union pushed for the operation.

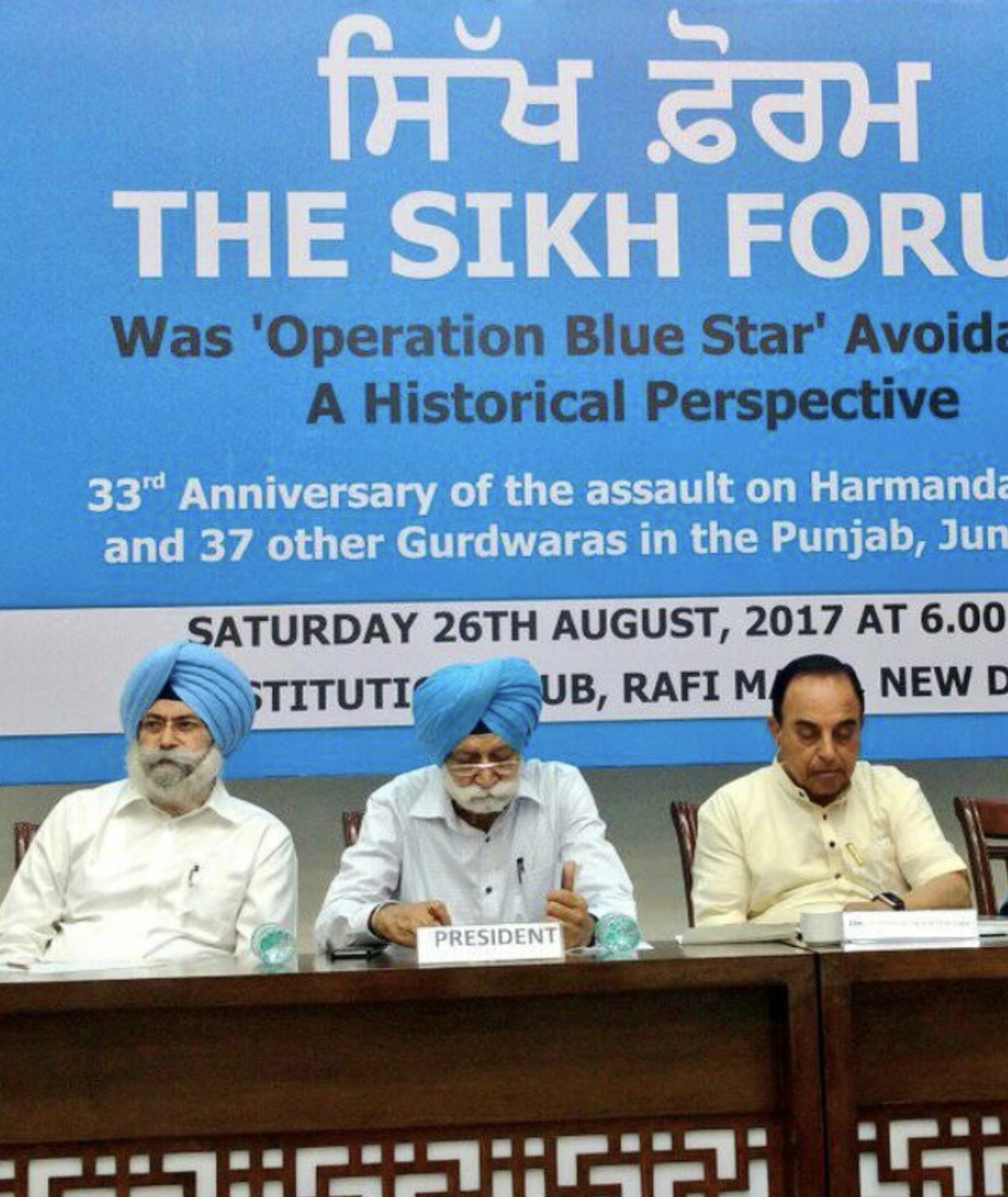
Harvinder Singh Phoolka, Pushpindar Singh and Subramanian Swamy at The Sikh Forum, 33rd Anniversary of Operation Blue Star.

=== Conspiracy theory ===
In September 2020, Swamy said that India's Central Bureau of Investigation (CBI), Enforcement Directorate (ED), and Narcotics Control Bureau (NCB) had "unearthed huge evidence" to prove in court that Bollywood actor Sushant Singh Rajput's death was "murder by conspiracy." Swamy also said there had been "systematic destruction" of evidence in the case. Two weeks before, Swamy had said the Mumbai Police were "complicit" in the murder, that Dubai was "involved," and that "the Bollywood Cartel remains to be identified and made as 'accessory before the murder'." In October 2020, after a medical board from the All India Institute of Medical Sciences (AIIMS) ruled out murder, stating that the actor died by suicide, a team of scientists associated with Microsoft Research, India released an independent report, "Anatomy of a Rumour: Social media and the suicide of Sushant Singh Rajput." They wrote, "Perhaps the most interesting case is that of sitting parliamentarian Subramanian Swamy, once a central player in the policy circles, now wilfully [sic] mongering deceit, and also the most popular Twitter handle in wordclouds [sic] of trolls." In December 2020, after more than four months of investigation, the CBI sent Swamy a 3-page letter stating it was looking into all aspects of the case "in a thorough and professional manner using latest scientific techniques," and that "no aspect has been ruled out," but making no mention of Swamy's conspiracy theories.

== Honours and awards ==
Year	Name	Awarding organisation	Ref.
2012	Distinguished Alumni Award.	Hindu College, University of Delhi.	
2016	Tamil Ratna	America Tamil Sangam	

== Books, research papers and journals ==
Swamy is the author of several books, research papers and journals. A complete list of papers, books and journals authored by him is given below. He has also co-authored with Paul Samuelson, a paper on the Theory of Index Numbers (American Economic Review, 1974) and another in the Royal Economic Society's Economic Journal (1984).

=== Books ===
- Hindutva and National Renaissance (Publisher: Har Anand Publication; ISBN 978-81-241-1527-5)
- Virat Hindu Identity – Concept and its Power (Publisher: Har Anand Publication; ISBN 978-81-241-1770-5)
- Economic Growth in China and India, 1952–70 (Publisher: University of Chicago Press; ISBN 978-0-226-78315-4)
- Indian economic planning: an alternative approach (Publisher: Barnes & Noble / Vikas publications; ISBN 978-0-389-04202-0)
- Building a New India: an Agenda for National Renaissance (Publisher: UBS PUBLISHERS' AND DISTRIBUTORS LTD; ISBN 978-81-85674-21-6)
- India's Labour Standards and the WTO Framework (Publisher: Konark Publishers; ISBN 978-81-220-0585-1)
- India's economic performance and reforms: a perspective for the new millennium (Publisher: Konark Publishers; ISBN 978-81-220-0594-3)
- Assassination of Rajiv Gandhi: Unanswered Questions and Unasked Queries (Publisher: Konark Publishers; ISBN 978-81-220-0591-2)
- India's China perspective (Publisher: Konark Publishers; ISBN 978-81-220-0606-3)
- Financial Architecture and Economic Development in China and India (Publisher: Konark Publishers; ISBN 978-81-220-0718-3)
- Trade and Industry in Japan: a Guide to Indian Entrepreneurs and Businessmen (Publisher: Prentice-Hall of India; ISBN 978-81-203-0785-8)
- Sri Lanka in Crisis: India's Options (Publisher: Har Anand Publications; ISBN 978-81-241-1260-1)
- Kailas and Manasarovar after 22 years in Shiva's domain (Publisher: Allied Publishers)
- Hindus Under Siege (Publisher: Har Anand Publications; ISBN 978-81-241-1207-6)
- Rama Setu: Symbol of National Unity (Publisher: Har Anand Publications; ISBN 978-81-241-1418-6)
- Terrorism in India: a Strategy of Deterrence for India's National Security (Publisher: Har Anand Publications; ISBN 978-81-241-1344-8)
- Corruption and Corporate Governance in India: Satyam, Spectrum & Sundaram (Publisher: Har Anand Publications; ISBN 978-81-241-1486-5)
- 2G Spectrum Scam (Publisher: Har Anand Publications; ISBN 978-81-241-1638-8)
- Electronic Voting Machines: Unconstitutional and Tamperable (Publisher: Vision Books; ISBN 978-81-7094-798-1)
- Swamy, Subramanian (2009). "Predictions and Meditations". India International Centre Quarterly. 36 (3/4): 202–222. JSTOR 23006413.
- The Ideology of India’s Modern Right (Publisher: Har Anand Publications; ISBN 978-8124118924)
- RESET: Regaining India’s Economic Legacy (Publisher: Rupa Publications; ISBN 978-93-5333-651-6) RESET was top selling new eBook of 2019.
- Himalayan Challenge: India, China and the Quest for Peace (Publisher: Rupa Publications India; ISBN 978-93-90356-19-5)
- The Hindu Manifesto for India's Democracy (Publisher: Har Anand Publications; ISBN 978-9391504489)

=== Articles ===
- "Can India make it? India's path to sustained growth" (Publisher: Harvard Asia Pacific Review, Volumes 6–8 by Harvard University. Dept. of East Asian Languages and Civilizations, 2002)
- "The response to economic challenge: a comparative economic history of China and India", 1870–1952 (Publisher: The Quarterly Journal of Economics, Volume 93 by Harvard University by the MIT Press, 1979)

=== Research papers ===
- "Economic growth and income distribution in a developing nation" (Publisher: Harvard University, 1965)
- "Nuclear policy for India" (Publisher: Bharatiya Jana Sangh Publication, 1968)
- "Plan for full employment" (Publisher: Bharatiya Jana Sangh, 1970)
- "Theoretical aspects of index numbers" (Publisher: Harvard Institute of Economic Research, 1985)
- "Land reforms: an economist's approach" (Publisher: Deendayal Research Institute)
- Samuelson, P. A.; Swamy, S. (1974). "Invariant Economic Index Numbers and Canonical Duality: Survey and Synthesis". The American Economic Review. 64 (4): 566–593. JSTOR 1813311.
- Swamy, Subramanian (1970). "On Samuelson's Conjecture". Indian Economic Review. 5 (2): 169–175. JSTOR 23294448.
- Swamy, Subramanian (1965). "Consistency of Fisher's Tests". Econometrica. 33 (3): 619–623. doi:10.2307/1911757. JSTOR 1911757.
- Swamy, Subramanian (1963). "Notes on Fractile Graphical Analysis". Econometrica. 31 (3): 551–554. doi:10.2307/1909994. JSTOR 1909994.
- Swamy, Subramanian (1969). "Optimal Allocation of Investment in a Two-Sector Model with Foreign Aid". Indian Economic Review. 4 (1): 35–44. JSTOR 23294380.
- Swamy, Subramanian (1969). "Systems Analysis of Strategic Defence Needs: A Sequel". Economic and Political Weekly. 4 (18): 772. JSTOR 40739578.

== See also ==
- TANSI land acquisition case
- Disproportionate assets case against Jayalalithaa
