= Ammal (disambiguation) =

Ammal is a town and commune in Algeria.

It may also refer to:

- Anjalai Ammal, an Indian freedom fighter.
- C. Kolandai Ammal, an Indian educator, writer, broadcaster and politician.
- Janaki Ammal, an Indian botanist.
- Kothainayaki Ammal, a Tamil writer, novelist, and journalist.
- K.P. Janaki Ammal, an Indian politician.
- Mayavaram Saraswathi Ammal, an Indian classical flautist.
- Rockstar Ramani Ammal, an Indian folk and playback singer.
