= P. Pandi =

Indian criminal

P. Pandi, also known as "Attack" Pandi, is a gangster from the Madurai area of Tamil Nadu, India. He was an aide to former Union Minister M.K. Alagiri. He has at least 20 cases filed against him. He was leader of the Dinakaran attack in 2007, and the murderer of "Pottu" Suresh. He was sentenced to life in prison for that crime.

His nickname came from his haircut, which was very sharp. "Attack" is a word used for "awesome" in Madurai and Chennai slang. According to urban legend, he was skilled at kabaddi and was known for aggressive play.

== Crimes ==
=== Dinakaran attack ===
Dinakaran conducted a survey that showed most people wanted M. K. Stalin to succeed Karunamidhi as DMK leader. Elder brother M. K. Azhagiri was sidelined. This led Pandi, as Azhagiri's aide, to rally his supporters and attack Dinakaran's Madurai offices. They firebombed the offices, killing 3 employees. Later he was acquitted in the case.

=== 'Pottuu' Suresh murder ===
Later, Pandi felt sidelined by Azhagiri's family, and by Azhagiri's personal secretary 'Pottu' Suresh. He thought Suresh was not letting him see Azhagiri. This caused Pandi to plan murder. The killers made Suresh get out of a car near the Azhagiri residence and hacked him to death in January 2013. According to sources, Pandi negotiated with police through his lawyer, saying he would give himself up if they arrested the DMK bigshot as well. He later absconded to Mumbai, where he was arrested in 2015.

He was convicted of Dinakaran attack and was sentenced to life. His appeal is currently before Supreme Court.
