= V. S. Chandralekha =

Indian civil servant and politician

State President, Janata Party Tamil Nadu
- In office 1992–2013

State President, Virat Hindustan Sangam Tamil Nadu
- Incumbent
- Assumed office 2015

Personal details
- Born: 14 August 1947 (age 78) Dindigul, Madras Presidency, British India (now in Tamil Nadu, India)
- Party: Janata Party
- Children: Abhijit Iyer-Mitra

V. S. Chandralekha (born 14 August 1947) is an Indian politician and former civil servant, who was the President of the Tamil Nadu state unit of the Janata Party, which merged into the Bharatiya Janata Party on 11 August 2013. M. G. Ramachandran had appointed her as probably the state's second woman collector, after Anna Rajam Malhotra of the 1951 batch. The latter was the first female IAS Officer and Collector in the country.

== Personal life and education ==
Chandralekha was born on 14 August 1947 at Dindigul in the then Madras Presidency. She had her education in Madras and mastered in economics from Presidency College, Madras before joining the Indian Administrative Service.

== Civil service ==
Chandralekha joined the Indian Administrative Service in 1971 and served as the Sub-Collector of Chengalpattu and Cheranmahadevi from 1973 to 1975 and as General Manager, Civil Supplies Corporation & Deputy Secretary, Food from 1976 to 1980. From 1980 to 1985, she served as District Collector, first, of South Arcot and then, Madurai. She served as the Director of Rural Development, Tamil Nadu from 1985 to 1988, Chairman of Women's Development Corporation, Tamil Nadu from 1988 to 1990 and Chairman & Managing Director of Tamil Nadu Industrial Development Corporation from 1991 to 1992. She resigned from the civil service in 1992.

== Acid attack ==
During her stint as the MD of TIDCO, she opposed the divestment policies of the then Chief Minister J. Jayalalithaa due to which Chandralekha faced acid attack at Egmore, Chennai in 1992.

== Political career ==
Chandralekha joined the Janata Party in 1992 after the acid attack. She served as the President of the party's Tamil Nadu unit from 1992. She unsuccessfully contested in Madurai Central Assembly constituency in 1996 Tamil Nadu Assembly Election. In 1996, she stood against Dravida Munnetra Kazhagam's M. K. Stalin for the post of Mayor of the Chennai Corporation, but lost. She participated in the 2006 Tamil Nadu Assembly elections as the candidate from Mylapore constituency and came fifth, garnering only 2,897 votes. She is a close aide of Subramanian Swamy. She is now Tamil Nadu state president of Virat Hindustan Sangam (VHS), an organisation floated by Subramanian Swamy in 2015.
