= M. K. Alagiri =

Indian politician (born 1951)

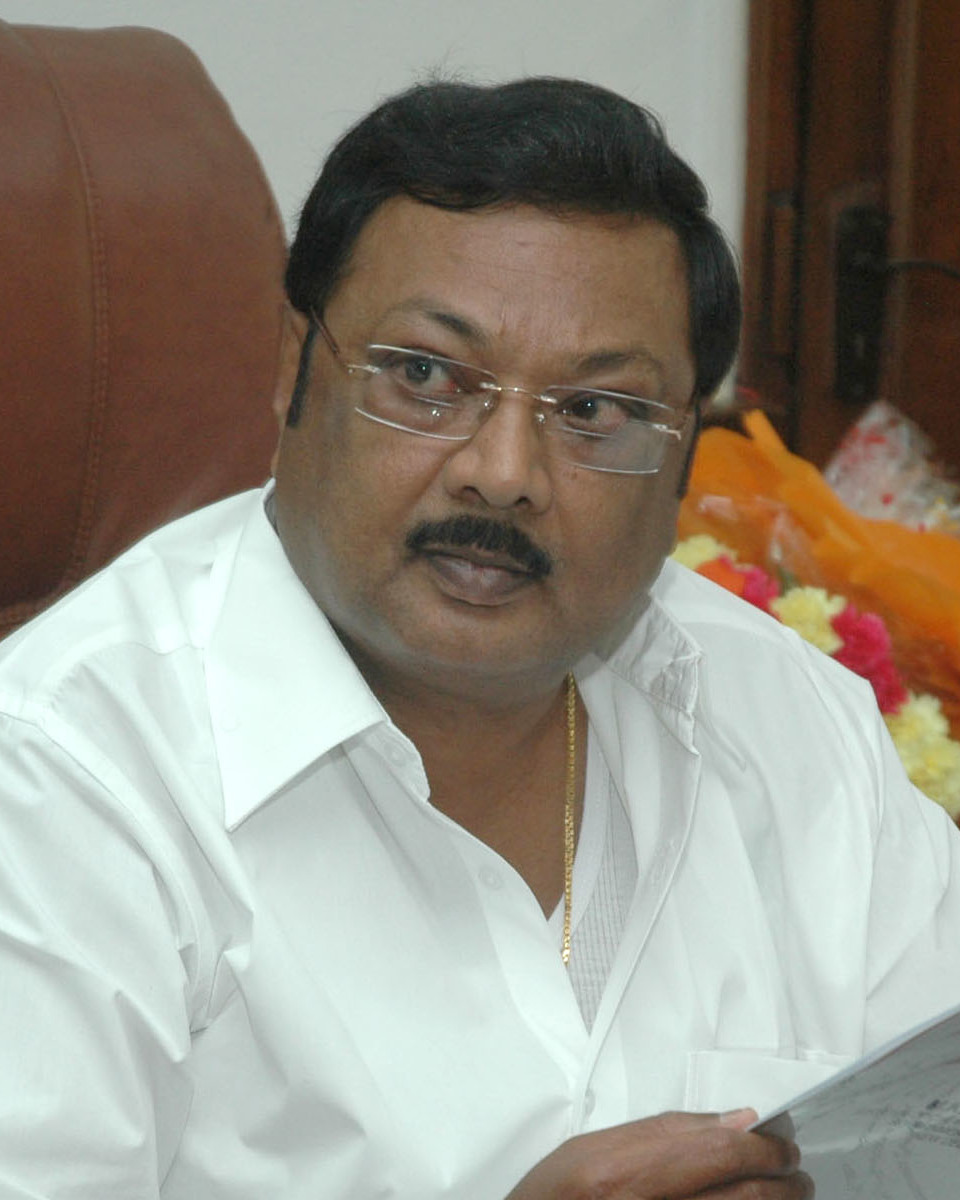
- Alagiri in June 2009

Minister of Chemicals and Fertilizers
- In office 28 May 2009 – 21 March 2013
- President: Pratibha Patil; Pranab Mukherjee
- Prime Minister: Manmohan Singh
- Preceded by: Ram Vilas Paswan
- Succeeded by: Srikant Kumar Jena, MoS (I/C)
- Constituency: Madurai

Member of Parliament, Lok Sabha
- In office 1 June 2009 – 18 May 2014
- Leader of the House: Pranab Mukherjee; Sushilkumar Shinde
- Preceded by: P. Mohan
- Succeeded by: R. Gopalkrishnan
- Constituency: Madurai

Personal details
- Born: Muthuvel Karunanidhi Alagiri; 30 January 1951 (age 75) Madras, Madras State, India (present-day Chennai, Tamil Nadu)
- Party: Dravida Munnetra Kazagham (until 2000, 2001–2014)
- Spouse: Kanthi Alagiri (m. 1972)
- Relations: • M. K. Selvi (younger sister) • M. K. Stalin (younger brother) • M. K. Tamilarasu (younger brother)
- Children: Dayanidhi Azhagiri; Anjugaselvi; Kayalvizhi
- Parent(s): M. Karunanidhi; Dayalu Ammal

Muthuvel Karunanidhi Alagiri (born 30 January 1951), commonly known as M. K. Alagiri, is a former Indian politician from Tamil Nadu and was a Union Cabinet Minister of Chemicals and Fertilizers from 28 May 2009 to 20 March 2013. He is the second son of the former Chief Minister of Tamil Nadu, M. Karunanidhi and his second wife Dayalu Ammal and the head of South Zone of Dravida Munnetra Kazagham (up to 2014).

== Early life ==
Alagiri is the second son of former chief minister of Tamil Nadu M. Karunanidhi and his second wife Dayalu Ammal. Karunanidhi named his son after his mentor, Pattukkottai Alagiri. He is believed to have spent his early life under the tutelage of his father and after his marriage on 10 December 1972, settled in Madurai. His wife is Kanthi Alagiri and they have three children, two daughters Kayalvizhi and Anjugaselvi, and a son, Dayanidhi Azhagiri. Alagiri graduated from the Presidency College in Chennai with a B.A. degree.

== Role in Dravida Munnetra Kazhagam ==
Karunanidhi always appeared to prefer his younger son, M. K. Stalin, Chief Minister of Tamil Nadu Alagiri shifted his base to Madurai during 1989 and did not hold any post officially in the party. In spite of holding no posts, he was all in command in the Madurai region and senior leaders in the party were unhappy about the factionalism created within the party. The DMK general secretary, K. Anbazhagan, in 2001, directed the party men not to have any contact with Alagiri. During the period of 2008, Alagiri was instrumental in the party winning three by-elections, the notable of which was Thirumangalam, where the party won with a massive difference. Based on the victory, Alagiri was appointed as the organizing secretary of the party for southern districts. Following the by-poll victories in the state, Alagiri was given the ticket for Madurai Lok Sabha Constituency in 2009 general elections, which he won eventually and later went on to become a cabinet minister.

There were widespread fights between the supporters of Alagiri and Stalin frequently. The succession crisis came out to a peak when party members loyal to Alagiri attacked the Madurai office of Dinakaran and set it to fire, in which three staff were killed. Dinakaran is a part of the Sun TV group owned by Kalanidhi Maran (son of Murasoli Maran), the grand-nephew of Karunanidhi. The newspaper published a higher prominence for Stalin over Azhagiri.

He was removed from the DMK party as member and as Secretary, South Zone on 24 January 2014.

=== Elections contested ===
Year	Constituency	Result	Vote percentage	Opposition Candidate	Opposition Party	Opposition vote percentage
2009	Madurai	Won	54.48	P. Mohan	CPM	36.67

== Controversies ==
Alagiri's name is associated with various controversies including conspiring in the murder of the former DMK Minister, T. Kiruttinan on 20 May 2003, initiating a cash-for-vote in Tamil Nadu for the Thirumangalam by-elections, attacking the Madurai office of the newspaper Dinakaran, and the Dhaya Cyber Tech Park land grab case. He is seen as the party strong man in Southern districts of Madurai. There have been various clashes in the state between his supporters and the ones of his younger brother M.K.Stalin over the question of succession and leadership of the party. He is also accused to inducing his strongmen in the party, who otherwise have criminal cases against them. Azhagiri is accused of instigating the attacks of popular Tamil newspaper Dinamalar in February 1997 when the daily published a criticism about him. His supporters like Nallamaruthu (brother of Essar Gopi) and Annadurai were convicted in Leelavathi murder, a high-profile political murder case involving murder of Leelavathi, a member of CPI(M) party and elected councilor of Villapuram.

=== T. Kiruttinan case ===
Azhagiri was accused as the main conspirator in the murder of the former Highways Minister, Pasumpon T. Kiruttinan, on 20 May 2003. Kiruttinan was hacked to death by unidentified men while he was out for a morning walk near his residence in KK Nagar, Madurai. The next day Azhagiri was arrested on charges of conspiring the murder due to intra-party conflict, along with other accused, namely P.M. Mannan who later became the Deputy Mayor of Madurai city, Essar Gobi, Madurai Corporation councillor I. Mubaraq Manthiri and V. Sivakumar (also called "Karate" Siva). Azhagiri was held as the main accused and charged with criminal conspiracy, murder and abetment. The case was transferred to Chittoor in Andhra Pradesh after the DMK came to power in the state in 2006, based on an order by Supreme Court of India. He was acquitted by the Principal District and Sessions Court in May 2008. The Madurai Police planned to appeal against the order in the Supreme Court as of July 2013 after a gap of five years from the judgement of the lower court. A leave petition was filed in the Supreme Court by the state, challenging the order of the Chitoor Court in September 2013. The petition was quashed by the Supreme Court counsel, which ruled that the state of Tamil Nadu had no locus standi in the case as it was transferred to Andhra Pradesh and that only the government of Andhra Pradesh can appeal against the lower court judgement.

=== Thirumangalam by-election ===
According to leaked secret diplomatic cables, he gave away ₹5,000 as a bribe to each voter through the morning newspaper in the January 2009 Assembly by-election at Thirumangalam and around ₹500 per voter in the 2009 Parliamentary elections. The by-election is believed to have started the cash-for-vote in Tamil Nadu.

=== Dinakaran attack case ===
In May 2007, Dinakaran, the newspaper run by Kalanidhi Maran, the elder brother of Dayanidhi, ran into a controversy when it published the results of a series of opinion polls which showed M. K. Stalin, the second son of Karunandhi, having more approval (70%) than his elder brother M. K. Azhagiri (2%) as the political heir of Karunanidhi. It also showed others as 20%, possibly indicating Dayanidhi Maran and Kanimozhi. The Madurai office of Dinakaran was fire bombed by supporters of Azhagiri and three employees were killed The Sun TV office in Madurai was also attacked by the perpetrators. A day after the incident, Prime Minister Manmohan Singh and Sonia Gandhi came to Chennai for felicitating Karunanidhi for 50 years in legislative assembly. Daynaidhi Maran, who usually accompanies Karunanidhi on every function, discarded the event as a mark of protest. On 13 May, the DMK administrative committee empowered Karunanidhi to remove Dayanidhi from the party. This subsequently led to his resignation from the central ministry. Karunanidhi family started Kalaignar TV to counter Sun TV of the Marans that started focusing on opposition leaders who were vociferous on Azhagiri and also covering the 2G spectrum case on minister A Raja, the DMK minister replacing Dayanidhi in the Union IT ministry. There were several attempts of reconciliation by the Marans, with two public meeting, once during Stalin's birthday in March 2008 and other during May when Karunanidhi was discharged from a Chennai hospital having been treated for neck and back pain. But when the Marans went to greet Karunanidhi on his 85th birthday on 3 June 2008, they were made to wait for an hour before finally denying entry. The family later reconciled with the efforts of Selvi, the eldest daughter of Karunanidhi. While the reason for reconciliation is not known, it was rumoured that the family reconciled to keep the third wife, Rajathi and her daughter Kanimozhi away from the family – that Kanimozhi was missing in the family reunion picture supported this argument. The management of Dinakaran accused the police of ignoring their formal complaint, which specifically sought action against Azhagiri, and instead choose to act on a suo motu complaint which did not include his name even in the First Information Report.

=== Land grab case ===
In 2011, a series of land grab cases were filed against Azhagiri's close associates and several of them have been arrested. It was alleged that Kanthi Azhagiri, the wife of Azhagiri bought lands worth ₹ 20 crores for ₹85 lakh from a lottery seller named Santiago Martin, who had 50 criminal cases against him. The deal took place soon Azhagiri became a central minister. According to the allegation, the family owned Dhaya Cyber Tech Park was built in a 4 acres (16,000 m^{2}) land out of the 23 acres (93,000 m^{2}) belonging to a temple in Uthangudi near Madurai. Azhagiri family refuted the claims stating that it is a vendetta politics by the opposing AIADMK, which ruled the state when the charges were leveled. The family were cleared off the charges by rural police in September 2011 that ran the investigation. Subsequently, the Corporation of Madurai recovered 8 cents (0.08 acre) of land from Dhaya Cyber Tech Park on 26 February 2013, that were encroached. The concrete wall, trees and lawn in the encroached land were demolished by the Corporation officials amidst tight security.

== Tenure as Minister of Chemicals and Fertilizers ==
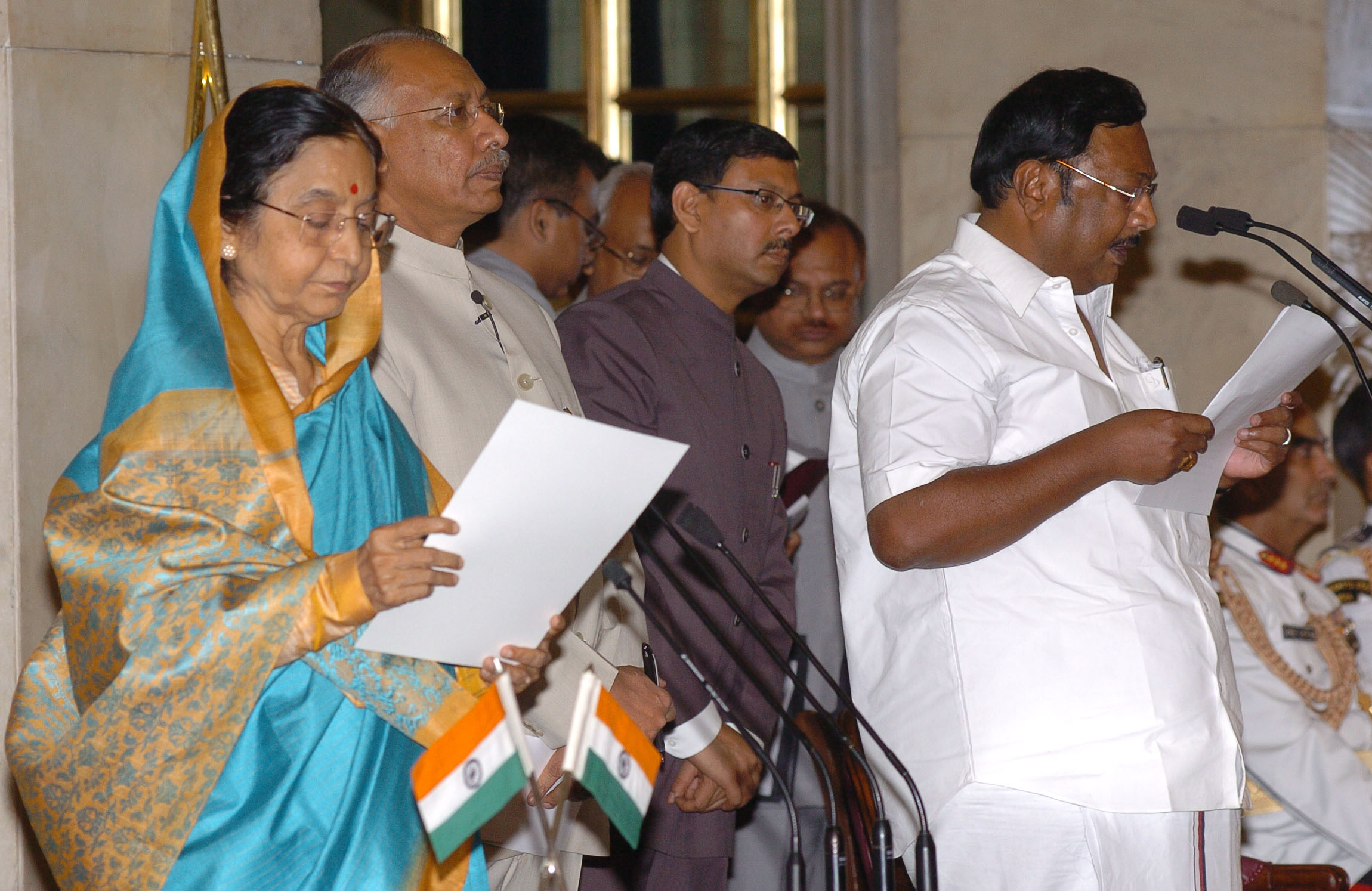
Azhagiri Sworn as minister

Azhagiri was appointed as the Minister of Chemicals and Fertilizers in the Union Cabinet, following UPA victory in the 2009 Indian Parliamentary Elections. He won his elections from the Madurai parliamentary constituency securing 430,688 votes against his next competitor P. Mohan from CPM, who secured 290,157 votes. During his early tenure, he requested the speaker of Lok Sabha to allow him to answer in Tamil, while senior Lok Sabha officials wanted him to answer in English or Hindi following precedents. Jena, the State minister of the ministry, answered all the questions raised in the parliament on behalf of Azhagiri. There were protests by the opposition party members in the Lok sabha during the Budget session in 2010 over the absence of Azhagiri. In January 2013, the Union minister of state for the Chemical and Industry ministry, Srikanth Kumar Jena, accused Azhagiri of inaction as a senior minister, in the alleged misuse of government subsidies by the fertiliser companies. He accused Azhagiri of not responding to any of his five letters he wrote to his senior colleague between March and August 2012. In his letters, he complained that the fertiliser companies, in spite of utilizing one third of the subsidies provided to the farmers, kept raising the prices of the fertilisers. Following the irregularities quoted by Jena, there were allegations by certain section of media of a possible scam to an extent of ₹1,000 crores in the fertiliser ministry. There were also allegations of nexus between the corrupt official in the ministry with the fertiliser companies, who together dictated the government policy on fertilizers.

DMK pulled out of the ruling UPA on 20 March 2013 following widespread protests in Tamil Nadu against the central government for not taking up the concerns of Tamils in Sri Lanka in the UN resolution against the alleged human rights violation against Tamils by Sri Lankan government. Azhagiri resigned from his ministry along with other ministers from DMK. There was a brief controversy when Azhagiri did not accompany the contingency led by T.R. Baalu, the head of MPs from the DMK party, to tender resignation in the Prime minister's office and to hand over the letter of withdrawal to the President on 20 March 2013. It was claimed as a mark of protest against his father Karunanidhi's decision to pull out from the central ministry. Some sources claim he delayed his resignation as he was not kept in the loop while taking the decision. Following his resignation, Srikanth Jena was appointed the minister of Chemical and Fertilizers.

== See also ==
- Karunanidhi family

== Notes ==
Political offices
Preceded by Ram Vilas Paswan	Minister of Chemicals and Fertilizers; 13 June 2009 – 20 March 2013	Succeeded by Srikant Kumar Jena
