= Madurai West Assembly constituency =

One of the 234 State Legislative Assembly Constituencies in Tamil Nadu, in India

Coordinates: 9.930°N 78.085°E

Madurai West
- Constituency No. 194 for the Tamil Nadu Legislative Assembly

Constituency details
- Country: India
- Region: South India
- State: Tamil Nadu
- District: Madurai
- Lok Sabha constituency: Madurai
- Established: 1967
- Total electors: 275,689

Member of Legislative Assembly
- 17th Tamil Nadu Legislative Assembly
- Incumbent S. R. Thangapandi
- Party: TVK
- Elected year: 2026

Madurai West is a legislative assembly constituency in the Indian state of Tamil Nadu. It is one of the 234 State Legislative Assembly Constituencies in Tamil Nadu, in India. Elections and winners from this constituency are listed below.

== Members of Legislative Assembly ==
Year	Member	Political party
Madras State
1967	N. Sankaraiah	Communist Party of India (Marxist)
Tamil Nadu
1971	K. T. K. Thangamani	Communist Party of India
1977	T. P. M. Periyaswamy	All India Anna Dravida Munnetra Kazhagam
1980	M. G. Ramachandran	All India Anna Dravida Munnetra Kazhagam
1984	Pon. Muthuramalingam	Dravida Munnetra Kazhagam
1989	Pon. Muthuramalingam	Dravida Munnetra Kazhagam
1991	S. V. Shanmugam	Indian National Congress
1996	P. T. R. Palanivel Rajan	Dravida Munnetra Kazhagam
2001	Valarmathi Jebaraj	All India Anna Dravida Munnetra Kazhagam
2006	S. V. Shanmugam	All India Anna Dravida Munnetra Kazhagam
2007*	K. S. K. Rajendran	Indian National Congress
2011	Sellur K. Raju	All India Anna Dravida Munnetra Kazhagam
2016	Sellur K. Raju	All India Anna Dravida Munnetra Kazhagam
2021	Sellur K. Raju	All India Anna Dravida Munnetra Kazhagam
2026	S. R. Thangapandi	Tamilaga Vettri Kazhagam

== Election results ==
Vote share of winning candidates
2026	40.78%
2021	41.59%
2016	44.81%
2011	59.64%
2006	43.66%
2001	48.06%
1996	62.42%
1991	63.35%
1989	50.32%
1984	51.24%
1980	59.61%
1977	43.06%
1971	47.88%
1967	59.42%

=== 2026 ===
2026 Tamil Nadu Legislative Assembly election: Madurai (West)
Party	Candidate	Votes	%	±%
TVK	Thangapandi SR	88,250	40.78	New
DMK	Balaji R	76,319	35.27	▼2.13
AIADMK	Sellur K. Raju	38,961	18.00	▼23.96
NOTA	NOTA	893	0.41	▼0.48
Margin of victory		11,931	5.51	▲0.95
Turnout		2,16,403	78.5	
Registered electors		2,75,689		
TVK gain from AIADMK		Swing	▲40.78	

=== 2021 ===
2021 Tamil Nadu Legislative Assembly election: Madurai (West)
Party	Candidate	Votes	%	±%
AIADMK	Sellur K. Raju	83,883	41.96%	−2.85
DMK	C. Chinnammal	74,762	37.40%	+1.49
MNM	V. Muniyasamy	15,849	7.93%	New
DMDK	P. Balachandran	3,417	1.71%	New
Tamil Nadu Ilangyar Katchi	K. Nagajothi	2,509	1.26%	New
NOTA	Nota	1,774	0.89%	−0.61
Independent	N. Ramu	368	0.18%	New
ABHM	R. Karthikeyan	318	0.16%	New
Independent	M. Venkatesan	126	0.06%	New
Independent	M. Premkumar	122	0.06%	New
Margin of victory		9,121	4.56%	−4.34%
Turnout		199,920	65.09%	−0.49%
Rejected ballots		425	0.21%	
Registered electors		307,141		
AIADMK hold		Swing	-2.85%	

=== 2016 ===
2016 Tamil Nadu Legislative Assembly election: Madurai (West)
Party	Candidate	Votes	%	±%
AIADMK	Sellur K. Raju	82,529	44.81%	−14.83
DMK	G. Thalapathi	66,131	35.91%	+0.65
CPI(M)	U. Vasuki	19,991	10.85%	New
BJP	A. Sasikumar	5,705	3.10%	+1.12
NOTA	None Of The Above	2,759	1.50%	New
PMK	R. Krishnakumar	927	0.50%	New
Independent	M. Venkatesan	360	0.20%	New
Independent	S. Muthupandian	332	0.18%	New
SMK	V. C. Meenakshi	310	0.17%	New
Gandhiya Makkal Iyakkam	S. Eswaran	277	0.15%	New
Margin of victory		16,398	8.90%	−15.48%
Turnout		184,180	65.58%	−8.55%
Registered electors		280,863		
AIADMK hold		Swing	-14.83%	

=== 2011 ===
2011 Tamil Nadu Legislative Assembly election: Madurai (West)
Party	Candidate	Votes	%	±%
AIADMK	Sellur K. Raju	94,798	59.64%	+15.98
DMK	G. Thalapathi	56,037	35.25%	New
BJP	M. Rajarathinam	3,149	1.98%	+0.57
Independent	M. Paul Pandi	2,959	1.86%	New
IJK	P. Moorthy	897	0.56%	New
Margin of victory		38,761	24.39%	21.74%
Turnout		214,423	74.13%	3.40%
Registered electors		158,950		
AIADMK hold		Swing	15.98%	

=== 2007 ===
2007 by-election: Madurai West
Party	Candidate	Votes	%	±%
INC	K.S.K. Rajendiran	60,933	51.68%	+10.67
AIADMK	Sellur K. Raju	29,818	25.59%	−15.72
DMDK	Siva Muthukumaran	21,272	18.04%	+6.95
INC gain from AIADMK		Swing		
Majority		31,115	n/a	n/a
Turnout		117,904	n/a	n/a

=== 2006 ===
2006 Tamil Nadu Legislative Assembly election: Madurai (West)
Party	Candidate	Votes	%	±%
AIADMK	S. V. Shanmugam	57,208	43.66%	−4.4
INC	N. Perumal	53,741	41.01%	New
DMDK	Dr. S. Manimaran	14,527	11.09%	New
BJP	P. Bhakavathi	1,851	1.41%	New
Independent	B. Ramakrishnan	1,261	0.96%	New
AIFB	L. K. Saravanan	814	0.62%	New
Margin of victory		3,467	2.65%	1.94%
Turnout		131,030	70.72%	21.72%
Registered electors		185,269		
AIADMK hold		Swing	-4.40%	

=== 2001 ===
2001 Tamil Nadu Legislative Assembly election: Madurai (West)
Party	Candidate	Votes	%	±%
AIADMK	Valarmathi Jebaraj	48,465	48.06%	New
DMK	P. T. R. Palanivel Rajan	47,757	47.36%	−15.06
MDMK	M. Manoharan	2,574	2.55%	New
JP	M. Balasubramani	627	0.62%	New
Independent	Dr. M. Meenakshi Sundram	569	0.56%	New
Margin of victory		708	0.70%	−44.05%
Turnout		100,840	49.01%	−10.40%
Registered electors		205,790		
AIADMK gain from DMK		Swing	-14.35%	

=== 1996 ===
1996 Tamil Nadu Legislative Assembly election: Madurai (West)
Party	Candidate	Votes	%	±%
DMK	P. T. R. Palanivel Rajan	61,723	62.42%	+27.69
INC	R. Muthusamy	17,465	17.66%	−45.69
JD	K. John Moses	13,965	14.12%	New
JP	A. G. Karunakaran	4,206	4.25%	New
Margin of victory		44,258	44.75%	16.13%
Turnout		98,890	59.41%	7.29%
Registered electors		171,126		
DMK gain from INC		Swing	-0.93%	

=== 1991 ===
1991 Tamil Nadu Legislative Assembly election: Madurai (West)
Party	Candidate	Votes	%	±%
INC	S. V. Shanmugam	59,586	63.35%	+34.55
DMK	Pon. Muthuramalingam	32,664	34.73%	−15.6
{{{party}}}	{{{candidate}}}	{{{votes}}}	{{{percentage}}}	New
Margin of victory		26,922	28.62%	7.10%
Turnout		94,060	52.11%	−18.96%
Registered electors		183,245		
INC gain from DMK		Swing	13.03%	

=== 1989 ===
1989 Tamil Nadu Legislative Assembly election: Madurai (West)
Party	Candidate	Votes	%	±%
DMK	Pon. Muthuramalingam	45,579	50.32%	−0.91
INC	R. V. S. Premkumar	26,087	28.80%	New
AIADMK	A. Karunaidasan	20,871	23.04%	−24.88
Independent	A. Vadivarsan	8,455	9.34%	New
Independent	G. Mariappan	826	0.91%	New
Margin of victory		19,492	21.52%	18.21%
Turnout		90,572	71.08%	2.55%
Registered electors		128,999		
DMK hold		Swing	-0.91%	

=== 1984 ===
1984 Tamil Nadu Legislative Assembly election: Madurai (West)
Party	Candidate	Votes	%	±%
DMK	Pon. Muthuramalingam	48,247	51.24%	+13.65
AIADMK	S. Pandian	45,131	47.93%	−11.69
Margin of victory		3,116	3.31%	−18.72%
Turnout		94,167	68.53%	5.36%
Registered electors		142,850		
DMK gain from AIADMK		Swing	-8.38%	

=== 1980 ===
1980 Tamil Nadu Legislative Assembly election: Madurai (West)
Party	Candidate	Votes	%	±%
AIADMK	M. G. Ramachandran	57,019	59.61%	+16.55
DMK	Pon. Muthuramalingam	35,953	37.59%	+16
JP	A. C. Kamaraj	2,178	2.28%	New
Margin of victory		21,066	22.02%	0.55%
Turnout		95,646	63.17%	9.24%
Registered electors		152,756		
AIADMK hold		Swing	16.55%	

=== 1977 ===
1977 Tamil Nadu Legislative Assembly election: Madurai (West)
Party	Candidate	Votes	%	±%
AIADMK	T. P. M. Periyaswamy	32,342	43.06%	New
DMK	Pon. Muthuramalingam	16,211	21.59%	New
JP	A. C. Kamaraj	13,168	17.53%	New
CPI	K. T. K. Thangamani	12,190	16.23%	−31.65
AIFB	S. Mayandi	1,192	1.59%	New
Margin of victory		16,131	21.48%	10.77%
Turnout		75,103	53.93%	−11.46%
Registered electors		140,580		
AIADMK gain from CPI		Swing	-4.81%	

=== 1971 ===
1971 Tamil Nadu Legislative Assembly election: Madurai (West)
Party	Candidate	Votes	%	±%
CPI	K. T. K. Thangamani	40,899	47.88%	+36.46
INC	P. Anandam	31,753	37.17%	+8
CPI(M)	N. Sankariah	12,774	14.95%	−44.47
Margin of victory		9,146	10.71%	−19.55%
Turnout		85,426	65.39%	−7.14%
Registered electors		137,117		
CPI gain from CPI(M)		Swing	-11.54%	

=== 1967 ===
1967 Madras Legislative Assembly election: Madurai (West)
Party	Candidate	Votes	%	±%
CPI(M)	N. Sankaraiah	46,882	59.42%	New
INC	M. Chelliah	23,012	29.17%	New
CPI	K. T. K. Thangamani	9,005	11.41%	New
Margin of victory		23,870	30.25%	
Turnout		78,899	72.52%	
Registered electors		111,707		
CPI(M) win (new seat)				
