= P. Ramamurthi =

Indian politician (1908–1987)

P. Ramamurti
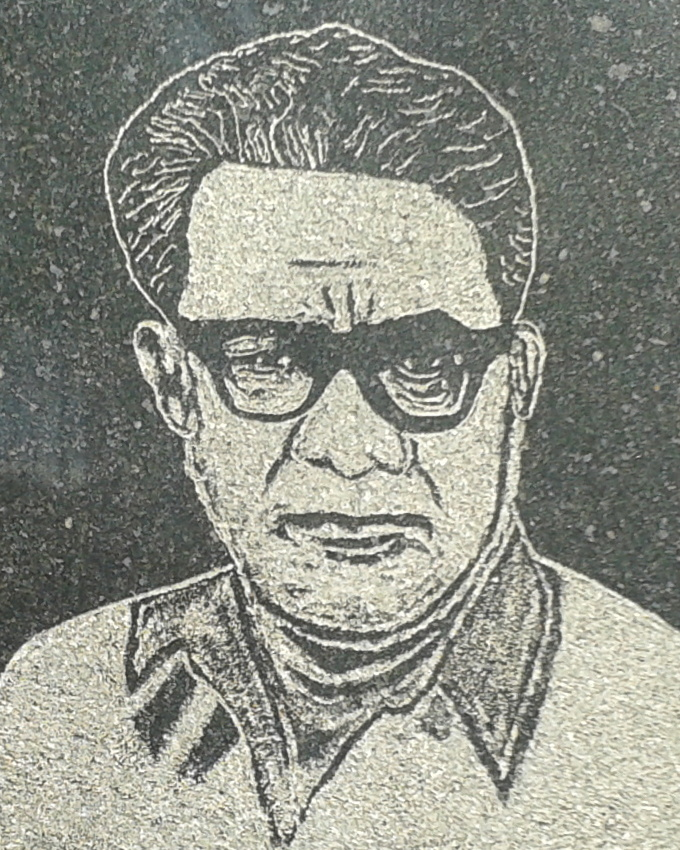

Member of Parliament, Lok Sabha
- In office 1967–1971
- Preceded by: N. M. R. Subbaraman
- Succeeded by: R. V. Swaminathan
- Constituency: Madurai

Madras State Leader of the opposition
- In office 14 December 1953 – 31 March 1957
- Preceded by: T. Nagi Reddy
- Succeeded by: V. K. Ramaswami Mudaliar

Secretary, CPI Tamil Nadu State Committee
- In office 1952–1953

Personal details
- Born: Panchapakesan Ramamurthi; 20 September 1908 Chennai, Tamil Nadu, British India
- Died: 15 December 1987 (aged 79)
- Party: Communist Party of India
- Spouse: Ambal Ramamurti
- Profession: Politician, Marxist intellectual, trade unionist
- Known for: Co-founder of Communist Party of India

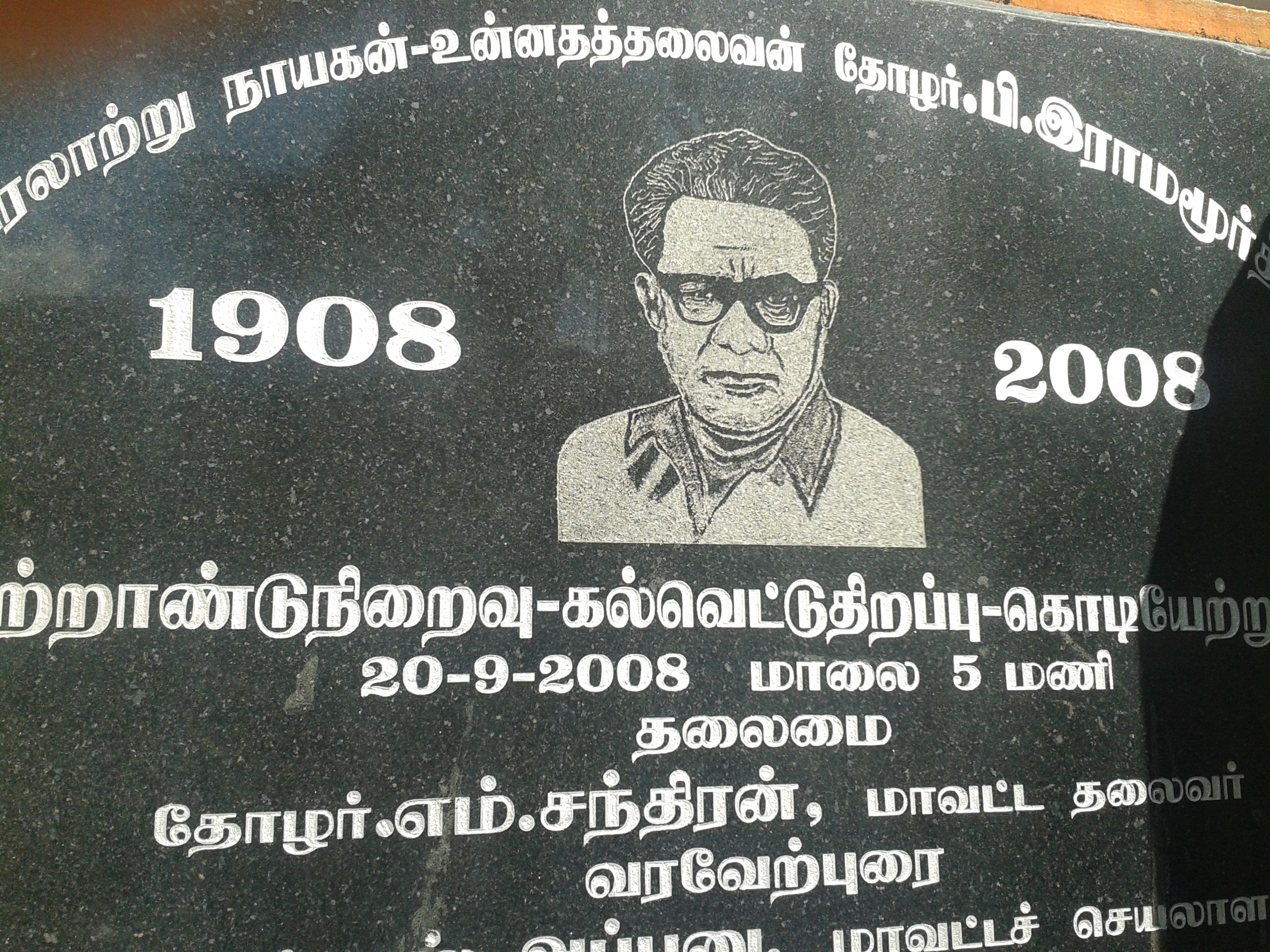
P.Ramamurthi centenary carving

Panchapakesan Ramamurti (20 September 1908 – 15 December 1987) was an Indian politician and a politburo member of the Communist Party of India.

Ramamurti was born in Chennai to Panchapakesan, a Sanskrit scholar. He obtained his education from Hindu High School, Presidency College, Madras and the Banaras Hindu University. He joined the Congress Socialist Party (CSP) during the Indian independence movement. In 1927, he was involved in the protests against the Simon Commission. Like many other members of the CSP in South India he then joined the Communist Party of India, and was one of the founding members of the party in Tamil Nadu. He became the Secretary of CSP in Tamil Nadu and was a member of the All India Congress Committee. In 1936 he began organising trade unions. Ramamurti was elected to the Madras Legislative Assembly in 1952 from the Madurai North Constituency. At the time he was in jail. In total P. Ramamurti spent eight years in jail and five years underground. Ramamurti was affectionately referred to as PR within the party and the larger Indian Left. He was the first Leader of the Opposition of the Madras State in 1952 in a House of 375. This was before the First States Re-organisation in 1956, which led to the creation of Tamil Nadu and Kerala. This election returned a fractured mandate, without any party gaining a simple majority. The Communist-led coalition formed the largest block and staked claim to form the government. But C. Rajagopalachari, India's first Governor General after Independence who was also from Madras, came out of retirement and convinced the then Madras Governor Sri Prakasa to invite him to form a Congress government in the state. The decision was highly criticized and was viewed as the Indian National Congress' machinations to defeat a popular government led by Communists. Rajagopalachari was not an elected member of the assembly as he had not participated in the polls.^{[6][7][8][9]} Rajagopalachari requested Prakasa to nominate him to the assembly thereby foregoing the usual process of election by the members of the assembly. Ramamurti opposed this by way of a petition in the Madras High Court seeking to annul Rajagoplachari's nomination. Ramamurti's daughter R. Vaigai writes(subscription required) about this during the end of a year-long celebration of his birth centenary in 2008 in The Hindu.

In 1953, at the 3rd CPI party congress, he was elected to the Central Committee and the politburo of the party. In 1964 he was part of the faction in the party leadership that formed the CPI(M). In 1967 he was elected to the Lok Sabha from the Madurai constituency. In 1970 he became the first general secretary of the Centre of Indian Trade Unions.

On 20 September 2007 CPI(M) general secretary Prakash Karat unveiled a bronze statue of P. Ramamurti in Madurai, marking the beginning of the centenary anniversary celebrations of P. Ramamurti.

== Bibliography ==
- For whom the BHEL tolls?, published in 1979
