= Chandralekha =

Chandralekha may refer to:

== Films ==
- Chandralekha (1948 film)
- Chandralekha (1995 film)
- Chandralekha (1997 film)
- Chandralekha (1998 film)
- Chandralekha (2014 film)

== People ==
- Chandralekha (dancer), dancer and choreographer from India
- Chandralekha Perera, Sri Lankan singer
- V. S. Chandralekha, Indian politician
