= Madurai East Assembly constituency =

One of the 234 State Legislative Assembly Constituencies in Tamil Nadu, in India

Coordinates: 9°55′41″N 77°58′29″E

Madurai East
- Constituency No. 189 for the Tamil Nadu Legislative Assembly

Constituency details
- Country: India
- Region: South India
- State: Tamil Nadu
- District: Madurai
- Lok Sabha constituency: Madurai
- Established: 1957
- Total electors: 3,36,738
- Reservation: None

Member of Legislative Assembly
- 17th Tamil Nadu Legislative Assembly
- Incumbent S. Karthikeyan
- Party: TVK
- Elected year: 2026

Madurai East is a legislative assembly constituency in the Indian state of Tamil Nadu. Election results from this constituency are listed below. For the 2016 Tamil Nadu Legislative Assembly election, Madurai East was one of 17 assembly constituencies to use voter-verified paper audit trail.

== Members of Legislative Assembly ==
Year	Member	Political party
Madras State
1957	P. K. R. Lakshmi Kanthan	Indian National Congress
1962	P. K. R. Lakshmi Kanthan	Indian National Congress
1967	K. P. Janaki Ammal	Communist Party of India (Marxist)
Tamil Nadu
1971	K. S. Ramakrishnan	Dravida Munnetra Kazhagam
1977	N. Sankaraiah	Communist Party of India (Marxist)
1980	N. Sankaraiah	Communist Party of India (Marxist)
1984	K. Kalimuthu	All India Anna Dravida Munnetra Kazhagam
1989	S. R. Eradha	All India Anna Dravida Munnetra Kazhagam
1991	O. S. Amarnath	All India Anna Dravida Munnetra Kazhagam
1996	V. Velusamy	Dravida Munnetra Kazhagam
2001	N. Nanmaran	Communist Party of India (Marxist)
2006	N. Nanmaran	Communist Party of India (Marxist)
2011	K. Tamilarasan	All India Anna Dravida Munnetra Kazhagam
2016	P. Moorthy	Dravida Munnetra Kazhagam
2021	P. Moorthy	Dravida Munnetra Kazhagam
2026	S. Karthikeyan	Tamilaga Vettri Kazhagam

== Election results ==
Vote share of winning candidates
2026	43.74%
2021	51.59%
2016	50.62%
2011	55.29%
2006	38.20%
2001	43.29%
1996	46.24%
1991	64.00%
1989	48.88%
1984	51.08%
1980	49.35%
1977	33.45%
1971	44.13%
1967	50.32%
1962	48.11%

=== 2026 ===
2026 Tamil Nadu Legislative Assembly election: Madurai (East)
Party	Candidate	Votes	%	±%
TVK	Karthikeyan S	118,777	43.74	New
DMK	Moorthy P	1,02,230	37.64	▼13.95
AIADMK	Mahendran K	31,016	11.42	▼19.32
RPI(A)	Prince S	1,591	0.59	New
NOTA	NOTA	1,177	0.43	▼0.39
Independent	Karthikeyan G	750	0.28	New
PT	Bharathiraja A	594	0.22	▼0.52
Independent	Mugeshkumar M	561	0.21	New
Independent	Pitchai V	240	0.09	New
Independent	Arun Pandian A J	217	0.08	New
Independent	Arasu S	196	0.07	New
Independent	Ajay Kannan A	163	0.06	New
TVK	Boomirajan K	159	0.06	New
Independent	Velladurai A	145	0.05	New
Independent	Chandra Mouliswaran A	121	0.04	New
Margin of victory		16,547	6.10	▼14.75
Turnout		2,71,566	80.65	▲8.34
Registered electors		3,36,738		▲7,748
TVK gain from DMK		Swing	▲43.74	

=== 2021 ===
2021 Tamil Nadu Legislative Assembly election: Madurai East
Party	Candidate	Votes	%	±%
DMK	P. Moorthy	122,729	51.59%	+0.97
AIADMK	R. Gopalakrishnan	73,125	30.74%	−4.6
MNM	I. Muthukrishnan	11,993	5.04%	New
AMMK	T. Saravanan	6,729	2.83%	New
None of the above	None of the above	1,944	0.82%	−0.7
PT	A. Balamurugan	1,755	0.74%	New
Margin of victory		49,604	20.85%	5.57%
Turnout		237,892	72.31%	−2.48%
Rejected ballots		53	0.02%	
Registered electors		328,990		
DMK hold		Swing	0.97%	

=== 2016 ===
2016 Tamil Nadu Legislative Assembly election: Madurai East
Party	Candidate	Votes	%	±%
DMK	P. Moorthy	108,569	50.62%	+11.32
AIADMK	P. Pandi	75,797	35.34%	−19.95
CPI	P. Kalithasan	11,599	5.41%	New
BJP	M. Suseendran	6,181	2.88%	+1.39
None of the above	None of the above	3,246	1.51%	New
PMK	Alaguraja	1,113	0.52%	New
Margin of victory		32,772	15.28%	−0.71%
Turnout		214,473	74.79%	−2.39%
Registered electors		286,766		
DMK gain from AIADMK		Swing	-4.67%	

=== 2011 ===
2011 Tamil Nadu Legislative Assembly election: Madurai East
Party	Candidate	Votes	%	±%
AIADMK	K. Tamilarasan	99,447	55.29%	New
DMK	P. Moorthy	70,692	39.30%	New
BJP	K. Srinivasan	2,677	1.49%	−0.14
Independent	V. Govindaraj	2,287	1.27%	New
IJK	K. G. Gnanasekaran	1,008	0.56%	New
BSP	A. Dhavamani	929	0.52%	New
Margin of victory		28,755	15.99%	15.93%
Turnout		233,061	77.18%	6.34%
Registered electors		179,869		
AIADMK gain from CPI(M)		Swing	17.09%	

=== 2006 ===
2006 Tamil Nadu Legislative Assembly election: Madurai East
Party	Candidate	Votes	%	±%
CPI(M)	N. Nanmaran	36,383	38.20%	−5.09
MDMK	M. Boominathan	36,332	38.15%	+35.64
DMDK	A. Dhamodharan	18,632	19.56%	New
BJP	A. P. Prabakaran	1,553	1.63%	New
AIFB	N. Subbaiah	655	0.69%	New
Independent	L. Thangavel	654	0.69%	New
Margin of victory		51	0.05%	−7.02%
Turnout		95,244	70.84%	15.92%
Registered electors		134,455		
CPI(M) hold		Swing	-5.09%	

=== 2001 ===
2001 Tamil Nadu Legislative Assembly election: Madurai East
Party	Candidate	Votes	%	±%
CPI(M)	N. Nanmaran	32,461	43.29%	New
DMK	V. Velusamy	27,157	36.22%	−10.02
Independent	N. L. Vasu	11,837	15.79%	New
MDMK	M. Boominathan	1,878	2.50%	−2.12
JP	Jarina Begam	586	0.78%	New
JD(U)	A. C. Kamaraj	507	0.68%	New
Margin of victory		5,304	7.07%	−15.53%
Turnout		74,980	54.92%	−6.84%
Registered electors		136,526		
CPI(M) gain from DMK		Swing	-2.94%	

=== 1996 ===
1996 Tamil Nadu Legislative Assembly election: Madurai East
Party	Candidate	Votes	%	±%
DMK	V. Velusamy	39,478	46.24%	New
AIADMK	T. R. Janardhanan	20,181	23.64%	−40.36
BJP	N. L. Vasu	14,915	17.47%	+10.04
MDMK	V. Muniyandi	3,946	4.62%	New
JP	J. Jebathurai	3,586	4.20%	New
AIIC(T)	R. Ramachandran	1,596	1.87%	New
Margin of victory		19,297	22.60%	−15.65%
Turnout		85,381	61.76%	5.76%
Registered electors		143,887		
DMK gain from AIADMK		Swing	-17.76%	

=== 1991 ===
1991 Tamil Nadu Legislative Assembly election: Madurai East
Party	Candidate	Votes	%	±%
AIADMK	O. S. Amarnath	50,336	64.00%	+15.12
CPI(M)	P. M. Kumar	20,248	25.74%	−7.06
BJP	R. V. Seshachario	5,841	7.43%	+6.44
TMUL	M. Ali Akbar	1,465	1.86%	New
Margin of victory		30,088	38.26%	22.18%
Turnout		78,650	56.00%	−10.53%
Registered electors		142,993		
AIADMK hold		Swing	15.12%	

=== 1989 ===
1989 Tamil Nadu Legislative Assembly election: Madurai East
Party	Candidate	Votes	%	±%
AIADMK	S. R. Eradha	40,519	48.88%	−2.2
CPI(M)	N. Sankaraiah	27,196	32.81%	−10.9
INC	M. K. Ramakrishnan	12,778	15.42%	New
BJP	T. R. Gopalan	817	0.99%	New
Margin of victory		13,323	16.07%	8.70%
Turnout		82,892	66.53%	−5.73%
Registered electors		126,225		
AIADMK hold		Swing	-2.20%	

=== 1984 ===
1984 Tamil Nadu Legislative Assembly election: Madurai East
Party	Candidate	Votes	%	±%
AIADMK	K. Kalimuthu	43,210	51.08%	New
CPI(M)	P. M. Kumar	36,972	43.71%	−5.64
Independent	J. S. Krishnan	1,663	1.97%	New
Independent	Brinda Janardhanan	879	1.04%	New
INC(J)	O. K. (Obula) Lakshmanan	638	0.75%	New
Margin of victory		6,238	7.37%	−0.58%
Turnout		84,590	72.26%	15.24%
Registered electors		120,711		
AIADMK gain from CPI(M)		Swing	1.74%	

=== 1980 ===
1980 Tamil Nadu Legislative Assembly election: Madurai East
Party	Candidate	Votes	%	±%
CPI(M)	N. Sankaraiah	36,862	49.35%	+15.9
INC	M. A. Ramamoorthy	30,923	41.40%	+10.68
JP	N. S. Ramamoorthy	5,647	7.56%	New
Independent	O. K. (Obula) Lakshmanan	382	0.51%	New
Margin of victory		5,939	7.95%	5.21%
Turnout		74,701	57.02%	−2.03%
Registered electors		132,153		
CPI(M) hold		Swing	15.90%	

=== 1977 ===
1977 Tamil Nadu Legislative Assembly election: Madurai East
Party	Candidate	Votes	%	±%
CPI(M)	N. Sankaraiah	24,263	33.45%	+23.76
INC	A. G. Subbraman	22,278	30.71%	−9.6
JP	R. V. Seshachari	15,629	21.55%	New
DMK	M. R. Sankaran	9,644	13.29%	−30.84
Independent	R. V. Siddha	508	0.70%	New
Margin of victory		1,985	2.74%	−1.08%
Turnout		72,539	59.04%	−12.79%
Registered electors		123,951		
CPI(M) gain from DMK		Swing	-10.69%	

=== 1971 ===
1971 Tamil Nadu Legislative Assembly election: Madurai East
Party	Candidate	Votes	%	±%
DMK	K. S. Rama Krishnan	27,884	44.13%	New
INC	L. K. T. Muthuram	25,472	40.32%	+2.89
CPI(M)	V. Veera Badhran	6,118	9.68%	−40.64
ABJS	S. K. Balakrishnan	3,707	5.87%	New
Margin of victory		2,412	3.82%	−9.08%
Turnout		63,181	71.83%	−7.28%
Registered electors		92,937		
DMK gain from CPI(M)		Swing	-6.19%	

=== 1967 ===
1967 Madras Legislative Assembly election: Madurai East
Party	Candidate	Votes	%	±%
CPI(M)	K. P. Janakiammal	32,173	50.32%	New
INC	A. G. Subburaman	23,929	37.43%	−10.69
ABJS	R. V. Seshachari	7,396	11.57%	New
Margin of victory		8,244	12.89%	0.50%
Turnout		63,936	79.11%	1.96%
Registered electors		82,764		
CPI(M) gain from INC		Swing	2.21%	

=== 1962 ===
1962 Madras Legislative Assembly election: Madurai East
Party	Candidate	Votes	%	±%
INC	P. K. R. Lakshmi Kantham	36,679	48.11%	New
CPI	N. Sankaraiah	27,228	35.72%	New
SWA	Ramu Servai	7,404	9.71%	New
ABJS	Ramia Seshachari	4,922	6.46%	New
Margin of victory		9,451	12.40%	
Turnout		76,233	77.15%	
Registered electors		101,097		
INC win (new seat)				
