= Sellur K. Raju =

Indian politician

Member of the Tamil Nadu Legislative Assembly
- In office 16 May 2011 – 5 May 2026
- Preceded by: K. S. K. Rajendran
- Succeeded by: S. R. Thangapandi
- Constituency: Madurai West

Personal details
- Born: 7 October 1952 (age 74) Sellur, Tamil Nadu, India
- Party: All India Anna Dravida Munnetra Kazhagam

Sellur K. Raju is an Indian politician and served as Member of the Tamil Nadu legislative assembly for the Madurai West constituency since 2011. He represents the AIADMK party. This was his first election and he won by securing 59 percentage of vote in Madurai west Constituency. He was the minister for Co-operation, which includes Co-operation, Statistics and Ex-service welfare.

== Personal life ==
Raju lives in Madurai, Tamil Nadu. He has a B.Sc. degree from Kamaraj University. Raju was admitted to MIOT Hospital-Chennai on 8 July 2020 for COVID-19 treatment and has made a complete recovery. He was discharged from the hospital on 17 July.

== Political career ==
He first won the Madurai (West) constituency in the state legislative elections in 2011 and has represented the party since. In 2016, Raju ran on a ticket, where he promised to turn Madurai into Sydney in a matter of 18 months as part of a smart city mission.

He publicly stated his admiration for Rajinikanth when Rajinikanth had finally announced his political plunge in 2018. Later, he stated that Rajinikanth might be able to win over Karaikudi aachi (elderly woman) but not Tamil Nadu aatchi (regime).

=== Tamilnadu Legislative Assembly Elections ===
Elections	Constituency	Party	Result	Vote percentage	Opposition Candidate	Opposition Party	Opposition vote percentage
2007 Bypoll	Madurai West	AIADMK	Lost	25.59	K.S.K. Rajendiran	INC	51.68
2011 Tamil Nadu Legislative Assembly election	Madurai West	AIADMK	Won	59.64	G. Thalapathi	DMK	35.25
2016 Tamil Nadu Legislative Assembly election	Madurai West	AIADMK	Won	44.81	G. Thalapathi	DMK	35.91
2021 Tamil Nadu Legislative Assembly election	Madurai West	AIADMK	Won	41.96	C. Chinnammal	DMK	37.40

== Thermocol Controversy ==
In 2017, Raju used thermocol sheets to float in the Vaigai reservoir to conserve water. He had said that ₹10 lakh had been allocated for the experiment to cover a portion of the dam in order to reduce water loss due to evaporation. The sheets were swept away by strong winds just moments after Raju set pieces of polystyrene afloat. Social media reacted quickly, mocking him and the officials for coming up with such an idea.
