= K. Tamilarasan =

Indian politician

Kasi Tamilarasan is an Indian politician and incumbent member of the Tamil Nadu Legislative Assembly from the Madurai East Constituency. He represents the Anna Dravida Munnetra Kazhagam party.

Tamilarasan was elected as member of legislative assembly in the year 2011. He secured a total of 99447 votes and defeated rival P. Moorthy of the Dravida Munnetra Kazhagam party.

Tamilarasan was an educated person, as he completed his schooling. After, he worked in his own land before entering politics.

He belongs to an agricultural family of Pathinetangudi village which is in Melur taluk Madurai district. His father's name is S. P. Kasi and his mother name is K. Nallammal. He is married to T. Arasi and he has three children, namely Diwakar, Aarthy, Ragul.

Tamilarasan was elected as Pathinetangudi village panchayat president in the year 1996, and continuously he was elected as panchayat president for the same village in the 2001 and 2006 local body election.

He was named as good field worker by their party members and seniors. By seeing his party works, the party chief selvi J.Jayalalitha elected him as Madurai Puranagar District J.Jayalalitha peravai secretary in 2008, then in 2011 he ran for the first time in assembly election and won with margin of 28000 votes at Madurai East Constituency.
