= Leelavathi murder =

1997 murder of an Indian politician

Leelavathi murder was a high-profile murder on 23 April 1997, involving the murder of Leelavathi, a councilor in Madurai, in the South Indian state of Tamil Nadu. She was an active member of Communist Party of India (Marxist) and was murdered by the opposing member of Dravida Munnetra Kazhagam, a leading party which ruled the state for many years. Her murder is also quoted as the first assault on a woman leader after the introduction of 33% reservation of women in local bodies in Tamil Nadu.

As soon as assuming office as Councilor during October 1996, Leelavathi brought piped water to her elected ward, which was a backward community bereft of water supply. The community also suffered as they had to buy water from lorry supplied water sold at a higher price by a water mafia. She was murdered two days before the formal inauguration of water supply.

The murder was prominent as the sentenced were functionaries of the ruling Dravida Munnetra Kazhagam party and were close to DMK. The court sentenced six to life sentence including that of Nallamaruthu, the brother of the DMK functionary Essar Gopi. On 8 February 2008, the accused were released during Anna birth century by the Dravida Munnetra Kazhagam for good conduct in spite of firm resistance from opposition parties. Nallamaruthu was again arrested in 2015 and sent to prison on account of further criminal charges. The murder opened up several debates on the participation of political parties in local body elections.

== Background ==
Leelavathi was from a humble background and was involved in weaving for her living. She was attracted to Marxism by her husband Kuppusamy, who was a functionary of the state unit of Communist Party of India (Marxist). She turned into an activist and social worker in Villapuram area in Madurai. Leelavthi contested successfully to the civic body elections in 1996 in Ward 59 in Villapuram. In the councilor election for the Madurai Corporation during October 1996, she defeated Valli, the wife of DMK party functionary Annadurai, who represented ward 59. The Madurai councilor post was reserved for women based on 33% reservation for women in local bodies. Annadurai fought against the election officer against declaring the result and issuing the winning certificate to Leelavathi quoting the margin of defeat. Leelavathi was successful in getting the certificate from the officer. During the same night, Annadurai came to Leelavathi's house along with his supporter for another fight.

As soon as she assumed office, her single mission was to bring piped water to her elected ward, which was a backward community bereft of water supply. The community also suffered as they had to buy water brought in by lorries sold at a higher price. She was successful in bringing piped water to her ward six months from the time of her election. She was murdered two days before the formal inauguration of water supply. Her work in bringing water to the community threatened the business of the water mafia of water tank owners who plotted her murder.

== Court proceedings ==
Leelavathi (40) was murdered on day light in Villapuram area in Madurai during broad day light by five armed men on 23 April 1997. She was going to a local provision stores at around 8:30 am when the gang of six equipped with sickles (aruval) started attacking her. She died on the spot in a pool of blood. The victim's husband filed a police complaint at around 10 am. Since Leelavathi was popular in her area, there were protests from public to arrest the killers and bring them to justice. The police arrested Muthuramalingam, Karimalayan alias Annadurai, Murugan, Murugan alias Soongu Murugan, Meenakshisundaram and Marudhu alias Nallamarudhu on 24 and 27 April 1997. The police also recovered the weapons from the accused. Nallamarthu (41) was brother of DMK party functionary Essar Gopi who was close to M.K. Azhagiri.

The case was conducted in the Madurai Additional Sessions court. The prosecution accused Muthuramalingam (A-2) armed with aruval cut the victim on the right side of the neck, Karimalayan alias Annadurai (A-1) with aruval cut the deceased on the right side of the neck, Murugan (A-3) with aruval cut the deceased on the cheek, right ear, right shoulder & right hand, Murugan alias Soongu Murugan (A-4) with aruval repeatedly cut the deceased on the right and left hands, Meenakshisundaram (A-5) and Marudhu alias Nallamarudhu (A-6). After multiple hearings, the court sentenced Nallamarudhu, the brother of DMK functionary Essar Gopi, and five others accused in the case during 2000. Their life sentence was confirmed by the Madras High Court in 2003. The court dismissed multiple bail pleas from the accused on the grounds of close political connection with the ruling party.

== In popular culture ==
Academics are divided on the view of political parties contesting in local body elections. As per Dr. G. Palanithurai, who heads the Pre election Voter Awareness Campaign of Tamil Nadu, involvement of political parties at grassroot levels would avoid the phenomenon of auctioning of the village president posts as done in many village panchayats. He showcased the contrast in Melavalavu incident where six people were killed without much of media notice compared to Leelavathi Murder case, which was taken up at a very high level since she was from a registered party. Other academics are of the view that the elections would be conducted on time for the local bodies as in the case of general elections, if it is left to the local parties.

Swaraj was an award winning movie which was based on the real-life story of Leelavathi, though under a different context setting outside Madurai. In the movie, the protagonist is portrayed fighting the cause of the backward community to bring piped water to them.

== Aftermath ==
M. Karunanidhi, the ruling Chief minister of Tamil Nadu, released Nallamarudhu and four others who were convicted and ordered life in the case. One of the sentenced died in prison during 2004. The release was ordered during the birth century of Annadurai on the grounds of good conduct from the convicted. As per another guideline, the life sentence should have been 10 years, but the DMK government reduced it to seven years during 2008. The release drew strong opposition from the CPI (M) party and other opposition parties in the state. The CPI (M) state secretary N. Varadarajan wrote to the chief minister opposing the release. As per the guidelines of the government, the people getting prematurely released during special occasions should not have any criminal proceedings for the next three years. Nallamarudu was involved in multiple criminal proceedings after his release in 2009 along with his brother Essar Gopi. As per the police statement, V. Balakrishnan, the Superintendent of Police, Madurai, sent a recommendation to the Government of Tamil Nadu to cancel the order of release of Nallamarudu during 2013 quoting continued criminal involvement. But the Madurai District Police received orders to cancel his release only on 20 August 2015. He was arrested on 23 August 2015 from his house in Avaniapuram area and was sent to Madurai jail.

Her murder is also quoted as the first assault on a woman leader after the introduction of 33% reservation of women in local bodies. It was a case study quoted in other cases where convicts were released prematurely during the life sentence on political grounds.

== Timeline ==
- October 1996 - Leelavathi elected Councilor for Ward 59 of Madurai Municipal Corporation.
- 23 April 1997 - A group of six armed men kill Leelavathi in daylight in Villapuram area of Madurai
- 24-28 April 1997 - Police arrest six men involved in the case, namely Muthuramalingam, Karimalayan alias Annadurai, Murugan, Murugan alias Soongu Murugan, Meenakshisundaram and Marudhu alias Nallamarudhu and recovered their weapons
- 8 February 2008 - The Additional sessions court of Madurai sentences Nallamaruthu and five others to life sentence.
- 20 August 2015 - Madurai District Police receives orders to cancel his sentence
- 23 August 2015 - Madurai Police arrests Nallamaruthu and sends him to Madurai jail
