= S. R. Thangapandi =

Indian politician from Tamilnadu

Member of the Tamil Nadu Legislative Assembly
- Incumbent
- Assumed office 11 May 2026
- Preceded by: Sellur K. Raju
- Constituency: Madurai West

Personal details
- Party: Tamilaga Vettri Kazhagam

S. R. Thangapandi is an Indian politician and a member of Tamilaga Vettri Kazhagam (TVK). He is the elected Member of the Legislative Assembly (MLA) for the Madurai West Assembly constituency in Tamil Nadu, having won the seat in the 2026 Tamil Nadu Legislative Assembly election.

== Early life and education ==
Thangapandi passed his 8th standard examination from Bharathiya Corporation Higher Secondary School, T.P. Koil, Madurai, in 1994.

== Political career ==
Thangapandi is a member of Tamilaga Vettri Kazhagam (TVK), a political party founded by actor-politician Vijay. He contested the 2026 Tamil Nadu Legislative Assembly election from the Madurai West Assembly constituency in Madurai district.

=== 2026 election ===
In the 2026 Tamil Nadu Legislative Assembly election, held on 23 April 2026, Thangapandi contested from Madurai West against Sellur K. Raju of the All India Anna Dravida Munnetra Kazhagam (AIADMK), Ragu Balaji of the Dravida Munnetra Kazhagam (DMK), and Vignesh Kumar of Naam Tamilar Katchi (NTK).

Thangapandi won the seat, securing 88,250 votes with a victory margin of 11,931 votes. The seat had previously been held by Sellur K. Raju of the AIADMK since 2011, having won in the 2011, 2016 and 2021 elections.

== Electoral record ==
Year	Constituency	Party	Votes	Margin	Result
2026	Madurai West	Tamilaga Vettri Kazhagam	88,250	11,931	Won

== See also ==
- Tamilaga Vettri Kazhagam
- Madurai West Assembly constituency
- 2026 Tamil Nadu Legislative Assembly election
- Vijay (actor)
