= Dinakaran attack =

Firebomb attack on a newspaper office in Madurai, India

The Dinakaran attack was a firebomb attack by M. K. Alagiri's supporters on 9 May 2007 on the Madurai office of Dinakaran, a Tamil language newspaper, which resulted in the deaths of three people. The attack was a response to a survey published by Dinakaran on who people preferred as the future heir of M. Karunanidhi, chief of the political party Dravida Munnetra Kazhagam (DMK). During mass protests throughout the region, the offices of the newspaper were firebombed and two press employees and a private security guard died. 17 people were charged by the Central Bureau of Investigation, but were all acquitted by the district court. Dayanidhi Maran resigned from the Union Cabinet, where he had been the minister for communications and information technology, as a result of the controversy surrounding the attack, which created a rift between him and DMK.

== Background ==
M. K. Stalin and M. K. Azhagiri, sons of the DMK chief Karunanidhi, were in a succession battle to be his political heir. In May 2007, Dinakaran caused controversy when it published the results of a series of opinion polls conducted by A.C. Nielsen Co. which appeared to show that Stalin had more public approval than his elder brother Azhagiri – 70% of those polled preferred Stalin, while only 2% preferred Azhagiri (another 2% supported M. K. Kanimozhi, daughter of Karunanidhi). The newspaper is part of the Sun Group which is owned by Kalanidhi Maran, who is a grand-nephew of Karunanidhi and brother of the DMK politician and ex-Union minister Dayanidhi Maran.

== Incident ==
On 9 May 2007, agitated by the results of the survey, DMK cadres in the southern district of Tamil Nadu, particularly the supporters of Azhagiri, engaged in protests at Kamuthi, Dindigul, Tirunelveli, Virudhunagar, Tuticorin and various places in the Theni district. At Madurai, they protested by burning copies of the newspapers and raising slogans against the survey and the Maran brothers. They also held a road block protest, threw stones and set seven buses on fire. Anticipating trouble, a team of anti-riot police under the deputy superintendent of Madurai were deployed outside the offices of the media group. Despite the police presence, a group of men hurled stones at the building housing the offices of Dinakaran, Sun TV and Tamil Murasu, all belonging to Sun Group. They also threw petrol bombs and set the building on fire, resulting in the death by asphyxiation of two employees and a private security guard.

The staff of the newspaper blocked the Chennai Madurai highway, demanding the arrest of Azhagiri, accusing him of responsibility for the incident. They also accused the police of inaction. Superintendent T. S. Anbu said there was no deliberate dereliction of duty by the police, but the Director General of Police, D. Mukherjee, later admitted dereliction of duty by policemen and ordered a probe be conducted by a senior police official.

== Aftermath ==
Kalanidhi Maran, managing director of Sun Networks, called this incident an "attack on freedom of the press", and vowed to fight for justice. M. Karunanidhi condemned the attack, calling it "an attack on democracy and press freedom", and promised legal action. On the issue of political heirs, he said that "there is no place for dynastic succession in the DMK". He later told the Tamil Nadu Assembly that he was puzzled by the timing of the survey, and had told the Dinakaran management that such polls may create unnecessary problems, but that the newspaper had ignored his advice. Several journalists' associations condemned the attack and submitted a memorandum calling for immediate police action, urging the government to bring charges against not only the assailants but also "the persons behind the conspiracy".

Maran, who is usually present along with Karunanidhi on most party functions, stayed away from the celebration of Karunanidhi's 50th year as a legislator, which was attended by Manmohan Singh and Sonia Gandhi. DMK's administrative committee suggested that Maran be removed from the Union Cabinet for violating party discipline. Maran, however, resigned voluntarily, insisting that he had never taken part in anti-party activities and that someone was misleading the party chief.

Kalaignar TV, a new channel owned by the Karunanidhi family, was launched as a potential rival to Sun TV when the tensions between Karunanidhi and the Maran brothers were at their height. The government also announced the formation of Tamil Nadu Arasu Cable TV Corporation Limited, a new multiple-system operator, which was intended to end the monopoly of Sun Cable Vision. In December 2008, the Marans made peace with the Karunanidhi family.

=== Court proceedings ===
The management of Dinakaran accused the police of ignoring their formal complaint, which specifically sought action against Azhagiri, and instead chose to act on a suo motu complaint which did not include his name.

On 16 May 2009, police arrested their prime suspect, P. Pandi (aka "Attack" Pandi), who later confessed to spearheading the attack. The case was transferred to the Central Bureau of Investigation, which named 17 accused in a 32-page charge sheet, including a deputy superintendent charged with dereliction of duty. In December 2009, all 17 were acquitted by the district sessions court, which claimed that the case had not been proven beyond all reasonable doubt. In March 2011, the Madras High Court allowed an appeal challenging this decision, despite a delay in filing the same. The CBI contended that the trial court "ought to have considered the evidentiary value of Prosecution Witness 1", even though he had "turned hostile" during the proceedings.
