= A. G. Subburaman =

Indian politician

A. G. Subburaman (1930–1986) was an Indian politician and former Member of Parliament elected from Tamil Nadu. He was elected to the Lok Sabha from Madurai constituency as an Indian National Congress (Indira) candidate in 1980 election, and as an Indian National Congress candidate in the 1984 election.
