= P. Moorthy =

Indian politician

Minister of Commercial Taxes, Registration and Stamp Law
- In office 7 May 2021 – 5 May 2026
- Preceded by: K.C. Veeramani

Member of the Tamil Nadu Legislative Assembly
- In office 19 May 2016 – 5 May 2026
- Constituency: Madurai East

Personal details
- Party: Dravida Munnetra Kazhagam
- Spouse: V. Chellammal
- Children: 2

P. Moorthy is an Indian politician who is a current member of the Tamil Nadu Legislative Assembly. He represents Madurai East constituency as a member of Dravida Munnetra Kazhagam. Previously, he represented Sholavandan constituency. He also serves as Tamil Nadu's Minister of Commercial Taxes, Registration and Stamp Law.

== Electoral performance ==
2021 Tamil Nadu Legislative Assembly election: Madurai East
Party	Candidate	Votes	%	±%
DMK	P. Moorthy	122,729	51.59%	+0.97
AIADMK	R. Gopalakrishnan	73,125	30.74%	−4.6
NTK	J. Latha	17,668	7.43%	+5.89
MNM	I. Muthukrishnan	11,993	5.04%	New
AMMK	T. Saravanan	6,729	2.83%	New
None of the above	None of the above	1,944	0.82%	−0.7
PT	A. Balamurugan	1,755	0.74%	New
Margin of victory		49,604	20.85%	5.57%
Turnout		237,892	72.31%	−2.48%
Rejected ballots		53	0.02%	
Registered electors		328,990		
DMK hold		Swing	0.97%	

2016 Tamil Nadu Legislative Assembly election: Madurai East
Party	Candidate	Votes	%	±%
DMK	P. Moorthy	108,569	50.62%	+11.32
AIADMK	P. Pandi	75,797	35.34%	−19.95
CPI	P. Kalithasan	11,599	5.41%	New
BJP	M. Suseendran	6,181	2.88%	+1.39
NTK	Sengannan	3,296	1.54%	New
None of the above	None of the above	3,246	1.51%	New
PMK	Alaguraja	1,113	0.52%	New
Margin of victory		32,772	15.28%	−0.71%
Turnout		214,473	74.79%	−2.39%
Registered electors		286,766		
DMK gain from AIADMK		Swing	-4.67%	

2011 Tamil Nadu Legislative Assembly election: Madurai East
Party	Candidate	Votes	%	±%
AIADMK	K. Tamilarasan	99,447	55.29%	New
DMK	P. Moorthy	70,692	39.30%	New
BJP	K. Srinivasan	2,677	1.49%	−0.14
Independent	V. Govindaraj	2,287	1.27%	New
IJK	K. G. Gnanasekaran	1,008	0.56%	New
BSP	A. Dhavamani	929	0.52%	New
Margin of victory		28,755	15.99%	15.93%
Turnout		233,061	77.18%	6.34%
Registered electors		179,869		
AIADMK gain from CPI(M)		Swing	17.09%	
