= N. Nanmaran =

Indian politician (died 2021)

N. Nanmaran (1946/1947 – 28 October 2021) was an Indian politician and Member of the Legislative Assembly of Tamil Nadu. He was elected to the Tamil Nadu legislative assembly as a Communist Party of India (Marxist) candidate from Madurai East constituency in 2001 election.
