= R. Gopalakrishnan (politician) =

Indian politician

R. Gopalkrishnan

Member of the India Parliament for Madurai
- In office 1 September 2014 – 23 May 2019
- Constituency: Madurai

Personal details
- Born: 5 October 1968 (age 57) Sellur, Madurai, Tamil Nadu
- Party: All India Anna Dravida Munnetra Kazhagam
- Spouse: Smt. G. Deepa
- Children: 2
- Education: Yadava College
- Occupation: Farmer
- As of 17 December, 2016

R Gopalakrishnan (born 5 October 1968) is an Indian politician and Member of Parliament elected from Tamil Nadu. He was elected to the Lok Sabha from Madurai constituency as an Anna Dravida Munnetra Kazhagam candidate in 2014 election.

Gopalakrishnan was born on 5 October 1968 in Sellur, Madurai, Tamil Nadu. He was educated at Yadava College in Madurai. He is married to Smt. G. Deepa and has two children.

Gopalakrishnan was Deputy Mayor of Madurai Corporation since 2011 to 2014.
