= S. Karthikeyan =

Indian politician (born 1969)

Sonaimuthu Karthikeyan (born 1969) is an Indian politician from Tamil Nadu. He is a member of the Tamil Nadu Legislative Assembly from Madurai East Assembly constituency in Madurai district representing Tamilaga Vettri Kazhagam.

Karthikeyan is from Madurai, Tamil Nadu. He is the son of Sonaimuthu Thevar. He did his BA and later completed LLB in 2021 at North East Forntier Technical University, Arunachala Pradesh. He declared assets worth Rs. 7 crore in his affidavit to the Election Commission of India.

Karthikeyan became an MLA for the first time winning the 2026 Tamil Nadu Legislative Assembly election from Madurai East Assembly constituency representing Tamilaga Vettri Kazhagam. He polled 1,18,777 votes and defeated his nearest rival and two time sitting MLA, P. Moorthy of the Dravida Munnetra Kazhagam, by a margin of 16,547 votes.
