= A. G. S. Ram Babu =

Indian politician (1962–2022)

A. G. S. Ram Babu (16 July 1962 – 11 January 2022) was an Indian politician.

== Biography ==
He was elected to the Lok Sabha from Madurai constituency as an Indian National Congress candidate in 1989 and 1991 elections, and as a Tamil Maanila Congress (Moopanar) candidate in 1996 election.

Ram Babu died from COVID-19 in Chennai on 11 January 2022, at the age of 59.
