= V. Velusamy =

Indian politician

V. Velusamy was elected to the Tamil Nadu Legislative Assembly from the Madurai East constituency in the 1996 elections. He was a candidate of the Dravida Munnetra Kazhagam (DMK) party.
