= K. T. K. Thangamani =

Indian politician

K. T. K. Thangamani, (19 May 1914 – 26 December 2001), was a politician from Indian state of Tamil Nadu. He was a senior Communist leader and former State secretary of the Communist Party of India. A bar-at-law from London, he has authored a number of books, and also had the distinction of interacting with late Chinese leader Mao Zedong and Vietnamese leader Ho Chi Minh. He lived in Singapore and Malaysia and returned to India in 1947. He was a prominent trade union leader. He died at the age of 88 on 26 December 2001. He was also a member of Lok Sabha elected from Madurai between 1957 and 1962 and an MLA between 1974 and 1976.
