= Pon. Muthuramalingam =

Indian politician

Pon. Muthuramalingam is an Indian politician and former minister and Member of the Legislative Assembly of Tamil Nadu. He was elected to the Tamil Nadu legislative assembly as a Dravida Munnetra Kazhagam candidate from Madurai West constituency in 1984 and 1989 elections.
