= Mayavaram Saraswathi Ammal =

- Born: September 3, 1921; Mannargudi
- Died: August 17, 2013 (aged 91) Tiruvanmiyur

Mayavaram Saraswathi Ammal (September 3, 1921 – August 17, 2013) was an Indian classical flautist.
