= N. M. R. Subbaraman =

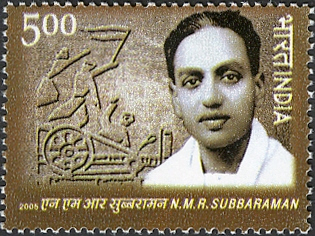

Member of Parliament for Madurai
- In office 1962–1967

Personal details
- Born: 14 August 1905 Madurai, Madras Presidency, British India
- Died: 25 January 1983 (aged 77) Madurai, Tamil Nadu, India
- Party: Indian National Congress

Naatamai Malli Rayalu Subbaraman (14 August 1905 – 25 January 1983) was an Indian freedom fighter and politician from Tamil Nadu. He was a member of Parliament from the Madurai constituency (1962–1967). He was also called "Madurai Gandhi" for his Gandhian principles.

== Biography ==
Subbaraman was born on 14 August 1905 to a wealthy Saurashtra family of Naatamai Malli Rayalu Iyer and Kaveri Ammal in Madurai, Madras Presidency, British India. He studied at Sourashtra High School, Madurai and Visva-Bharati University, Santiniketan. He joined the Indian National Congress and participated in Indian independence movement at a young age. He was imprisoned for five years during the independence movement along with his wife Parvatavardhani. Mahatma Gandhi stayed at his bungalow during a visit to Madurai. As a member of the Harijan Sevak Sangh, an organisation founded by Gandhi to remove untouchability from the Indian society, he worked for the advancement of the depressed classes. He, along with A. Vaidyanatha Iyer, organised a temple entry conference and helped the people of the depressed classes to enter Meenakshi Amman Temple. He was involved in the Bhoodan movement and donated his 100 acres of land to the movement. He contributed to establishing the first Gandhi Memorial Museum in Madurai.

He won the 1937 and 1946 elections and served as the state legislator in the Madras Presidency. He was elected as a member of Parliament in the 1962 Lok Sabha election from Madurai.

He died on 25 January 1983 in Madurai. In 2005, to commemorate his 100th birthday, the Government of India issued a stamp with his image. In 2007, a women's college was named after him.
