= Mullipallam =

Mullipallam Mullai
- village
- Location in Tamil Nadu#India
- Coordinates: 10.028714°N 77.943819°E
- Country: India
- State: Tamil Nadu
- District: Madurai

Languages
  - Official: Tamil
- Time zone: UTC+5:30 (IST)
- PIN: 625 207
- Vehicle registration: TN 59
- Nearest city: Madurai
- Lok Sabha constituency: Theni

Mullipallam is a panchayat village in Vadipatti Taluka of Madurai district, Tamil Nadu, India, with a total of 2173 families residing.

The Mullipallam has population of 7903 of which 3972 are males while 3931 are females as per Population Census 2011. In Mullipallam village population of children with age 0-6 is 803 which makes up 10.16% of total population of village. Average Sex Ratio of Mullipallam village is 990 which is lower than Tamil Nadu state average of 996. Child Sex Ratio for the Mullipallam as per census is 930, lower than Tamil Nadu average of 943. Mullipallam village has lower literacy rate compared to Tamil Nadu. In 2011, literacy rate of Mullipallam village was 78.96% compared to 80.09% of Tamil Nadu. In Mullipallam Male literacy stands at 87.32% while female literacy rate was 70.57%. As per constitution of India and Panchyati Raaj Act, Mullipallam village is administrated by Sarpanch (Head of Village) who is elected representative of village.

Work Profile In Mullipallam village out of total population, 3939 were engaged in work activities. 85.94% of workers describe their work as Main Work (Employment or Earning more than 6 Months) while 14.06% were involved in Marginal activity providing livelihood for less than 6 months. Of 3939 workers engaged in Main Work, 349 were cultivators (owner or co-owner) while 1862 were Agricultural labourer.
