= K. P. Janaki Ammal =

Indian politician and women's rights activist

Member of the Tamil Nadu Legislative Assembly for Madurai East
- Incumbent
- Assumed office 1967

President of All India Democratic Women's Association

Personal details
- Born: Dec 9, 1917, Thirunagari, Madurai
- Died: 1 March 1992
- Party: Communist Party of India (Marxist)
- Spouse: Gurusamy Naidu
- Profession: Freedom Fighter and Politician

K. Padmanabhan Janaki Ammal (1917-1992) was a politician from Communist Party of India (Marxist) and president of All India Democratic Women's Association. She represented Madurai East in the Tamil Nadu legislative assembly in 1967.

== Early life ==
Born in 1917, she was the only child of Padmanabhan and Lakshmi. Her early life was spent in poverty. Her mother died when she was 8 years old, and she was raised by her grandmother. She dropped out of school in the eighth grade, in order to pursue music. Shri Palaniappa Pillai Boys Company for a salary of Rs.25 per month. She later went on to become the lead actress and earned over Rs. 300 per performance. She teamed up with S.S. Viswanathadas on stage to engage with the issue of caste-based untouchability.

Janaki Ammal married a harmonium player from the troupe, Gurusamy Naidu.

== Career ==
She is known as the first South Indian woman to be arrested by the British. She was first arrested in 1930 while performing in Tirunelveli and spent one year in jail. She was arrested for participating in anti-war propaganda in Trichy, under the Defence of India Rules.

She was one of the active political members of the Individual Satyagraha Movement. In 1936, she joined the Congress party and worked as the office bearer in the Madurai Congress Committee. She then shifted to the Congress Socialist Party. She joined the Communist Party of India in 1940. After the party's split, she moved to the Communist Party of India (Marxist).

Janaki Ammal and Ponmalai Paapa Umanath were founders of the Tamil Nadu Democratic Women's Association in 1974, where the former became its first president.

== Personal life ==
During the Emergency, she sold off her jewelry and silk clothes to raise money for food for party cadres.

Repeated arrests and never-ending hard work took a toll on her health. She died of asthma on 1 March 1992.
