= Virat Hindustan Sangam =

Indian cultural organisation

- Logo of VHS
- Abbreviation: VHS
- Formation: 8 April 2015; 11 years ago
- Founder: Subramanian Swamy
- Purpose: Hindu Renaissance in the form cultural under the values of Hindus, Buddhists, Jains, Parsis, Sikhs
- Region served: India
- President: Subramanian Swamy
- General Secretary: Jagdish Shetty; Arvind Chaturvedi
- Website: vhsindia.org

The Virat Hindustan Sangam (abbr. VHS) is an Indian cultural organisation. It was founded by Subramanian Swamy on 8 April 2015. Its stated objective is "to pave way for a Hindu Renaissance based on the concepts of Sanatana Dharma". It was established to push issues like building Ram Mandir, scrapping Article 370 and bringing Uniform Civil Code and consolidating Hindus, Buddhists, Parsis, Jains, Sikhs under one umbrella.

Sri Lankan politician Mahinda Rajapaksa had also addressed an event organised by VHS in 2018, where he said that war of 2009 was against terrorism and not against the Tamil community.
