= P. Mohan (Madurai politician) =

Indian politician

Member of Parliament
- Succeeded by: M.K.Alagiri
- Constituency: Madurai

Personal details
- Born: 30 December 1949 Madurai, Tamil Nadu
- Died: 30 October 2009 (aged 59) Chennai
- Party: CPI(M)
- As of 22 September, 2006

Ponnusamy Mohan (30 December 1949 – 30 October 2009) was an Indian politician and a member of the state unit of the Communist Party of India (Marxist) (CPI(M)). He was a member of the 13th Lok Sabha and 14th Lok Sabha, representing the Madurai constituency of Tamil Nadu as a candidate of the CPI(M). He died on 30 October 2009.
