= Paalam =

Paalam or Palam may refer to:

== Films ==
- Paalam (1983 film), 1983 Indian Malayalam film
- Paalam (1990 film), 1990 Indian Tamil film
- Walang Hanggang Paalam, a Philippine crime drama television series

== Other uses ==
- Pa Alam, a village in Pol-e Dokhtar County, Lorestan province, Iran
- Carlo Paalam (born 1998), a Filipino boxer
- Palam, a suburb and residential colony in South West Delhi
  - Palam (Delhi Assembly constituency)
  - Palam A Stadium, cricket stadium
  - Palam B Stadium, cricket stadium
  - Palam Marg, road in Delhi
  - Palam metro station, metro station of the Delhi Metro
  - Palam Village
- Palam Rajauri, a village in Jammu and Kashmir, India
