= Alwarpuram =

Neighbourhood in Madurai district, Tamil Nadu, India

- Neighbourhood
- Alwarpuram, Madurai, Tamil Nadu
- Coordinates: 9.9286°N 78.1351°E
- Country: India
- State: Tamil Nadu
- District: Madurai
- Elevation: 161.19 m (528.8 ft)

Languages
  - Official: Tamil, English
  - Speech: Tamil, English
- Time zone: UTC+5:30 (IST)
- PIN: 625020
- Telephone code: +91452*******
- Vehicle registration: TN 59 ** XXXX
- Other Neighbourhoods: Goripalayam, Sellur, Nelpettai, Simmakkal, Yanaikkal, Anna Nagar, K. K. Nagar, Tallakulam
- Corporation: Madurai Municipal Corporation
- LS: Madurai
- VS: Madurai South

Alwarpuram which is pronounced as 'Aallhwaarpuram' is a neighbourhood in Madurai of Tamil Nadu state in India.

== Location ==
Alwarpuram is located with the coordinates of (9.9286°N 78.1351°E) near Goripalayam.

Alwarpuram (Tamil Nadu)

== Details ==
Every year during Chithirai festival, Lord Kallallhagar enters the Vaigai River in Madurai near Alwarpuram. Madurai corporation installed steel gates at Alwarpuram near the riverfront to control the dumping and polluting the area. Also, Kallallhagar on his return journey to Alagar Koil, again visits Alwarpuram before going to Mysore Maharaja mandap for the event of 'Pooppallakku' there which is celebrated in a grand manner.

== Recreation ==
Recreational places such as Gandhi Museum and Rajaji Park in Madurai are situated at Alwarpuram.

== Politics ==
Alwarpuram area falls under the Madurai South Assembly constituency. Also, this area belongs to Madurai Lok Sabha constituency.
