= Uttara Swami Malai Temple =

Hindu temple in India

Uttara Swami Malai Temple (உத்தர சுவாமி மலை கோயில்)
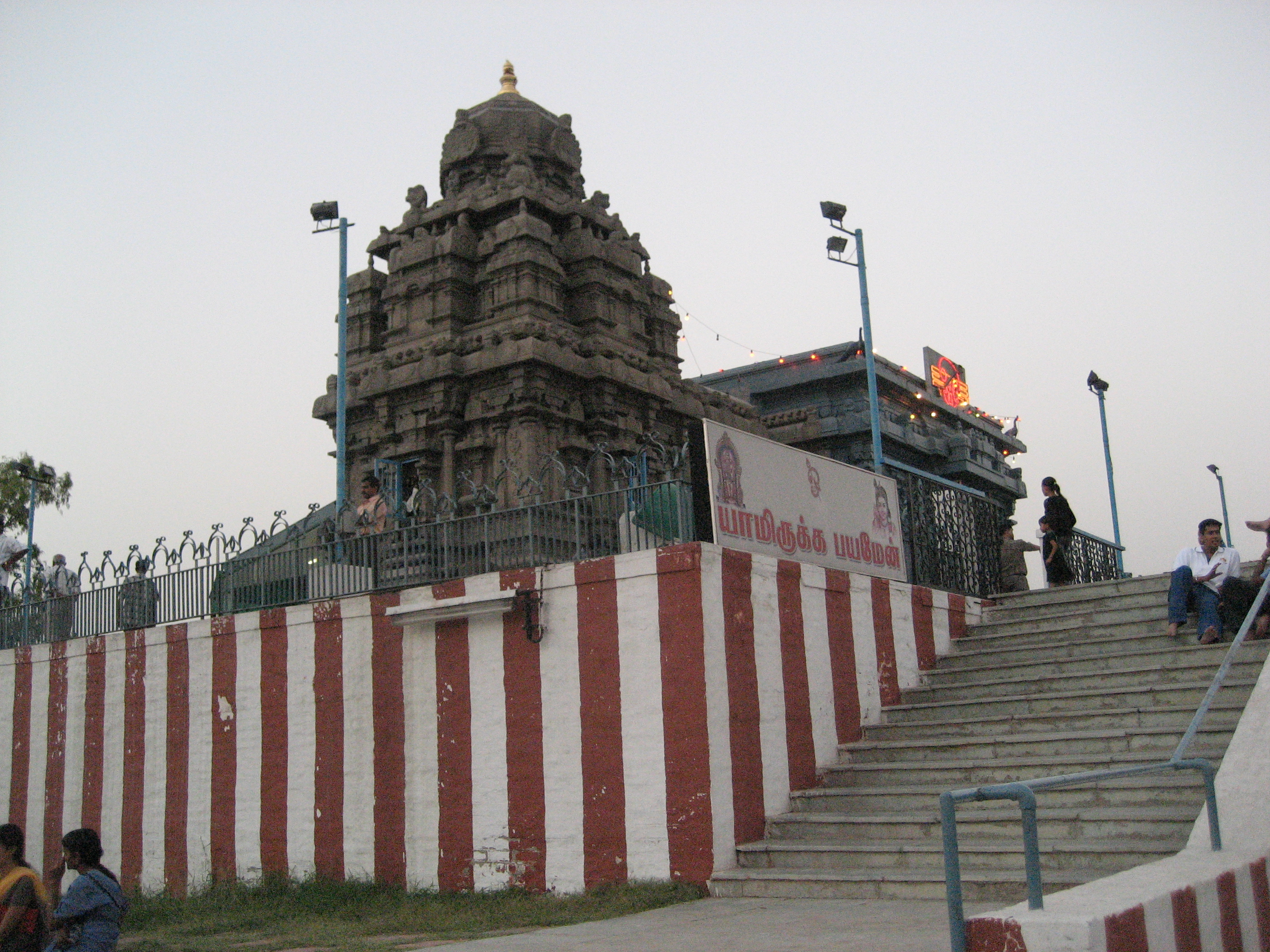
- Sree Swaminatha Swami Temple at the Malai Mandir Complex in Delhi

- Location in Delhi

Religion
- Affiliation: Hinduism
- Deity: Sree Swaminatha Swami

Location
- Location: R. K. Puram, New Delhi
- Country: India
- Coordinates: 28°34′3″N 77°9′56″E

Architecture
- Type: Tamil Architecture
- Creator: Sri Swaminatha Swami Seva Samaj
- Completed: 7 June 1973

Uttara Swami Malai Temple, popularly known as Malai Mandir (literally, Hill Temple in Tamil), is a Hindu temple complex in New Delhi, India located on the affluent Palam Marg. A North Indian replica of the Swamimalai temple near Kumbakonam in Tamil Nadu, the temple is primarily dedicated to Lord Swaminatha (more commonly known as Lord Murugan), most revered by the religious Hindus of Tamil and other South Indian community in the city. The temple is located about 2 km from Vasant Vihar metro station.

== Architecture ==
The main temple within the complex, formally called Sree Swaminatha Swami Temple, houses the sanctum sanctorum of Lord Swaminatha. It is situated atop a small hillock in Sector-7 R.K. Puram and overlooking Vasant Vihar in South West Delhi. This is in keeping with the tradition of locating Murugan temples on hills. The sign outside the main temple is written in Tamil, proclaiming Lord Swaminatha's motto, "Yaamirukka Bayamain" (யாமிருக்க பயமேன்) meaning "Why fear when I am there?". The temple is built entirely of granite, and is reminiscent of the Chola-style Dravidian architecture.

Besides the main Swaminatha Swami Temple, the complex contains temples dedicated to Sree Karpaga Vinayagar (elder brother of Lord Swaminatha), Sree Sundareswarar (father of Lord Swaminatha) and Devi Meenakshi (mother of Lord Swaminatha). These subsidiary temples draw inspiration from the Pandya style of Tamil Architecture, as can be seen at the historic Meenakshi Amman Temple in Madurai, Tamil Nadu.

In the Hindu religion, the peacock is considered Lord Swaminatha's mount or vahana. Accordingly, the temple has adopted a peacock as its pet. This peacock can be seen and heard among the trees and foliage within the temple compound. People from various backgrounds visit the temple.

== History ==
- 8 September 1965 The foundation stone for the temple is laid by M. Bhakthavatsalam, Chief Minister of Tamil Nadu, at a function held under the presidency of Sri Lal Bahadur Shastri, then Prime Minister of India.
- 7 June 1973 The main temple for Lord Swaminatha - Sree Swaminatha Swami Temple - is consecrated and a Mahakumbhabhishekham performed.
- 13 June 1990 The temples for Sree Karpaga Vinayakar, Sree Sundareswarar and Devi Meenakshi are consecrated and Mahakumbhabhishekhams performed. A Jeeranoddharana Kumbhabhishekham for the Lord Swaminatha temple is also performed on the same day.
- 7 July 1995 The Navagraha temple (nine planets), along with a small temple for Idumban Swami, is consecrated and Kumbhabhishekham performed.
- 9 November 1997 The Adi Sankara Hall is inaugurated.
- 27 June 2001 The third Punaruddharana, Ashtabandhana and Swarna-Rajatha Bandhana Mahakumbhabhishekham of the temples are performed by H.H. Kanchi Kamakoti Peethadhipati Sri Jayendra Saraswati Swamigal. H.H. Sri Vijayendra Saraswati Swamigal also participates in the yagna pooja on the night of 25 June 2001.
