= Meenakshi Tirukalyanam =

Annual Tamil Hindu festival in Madurai, India

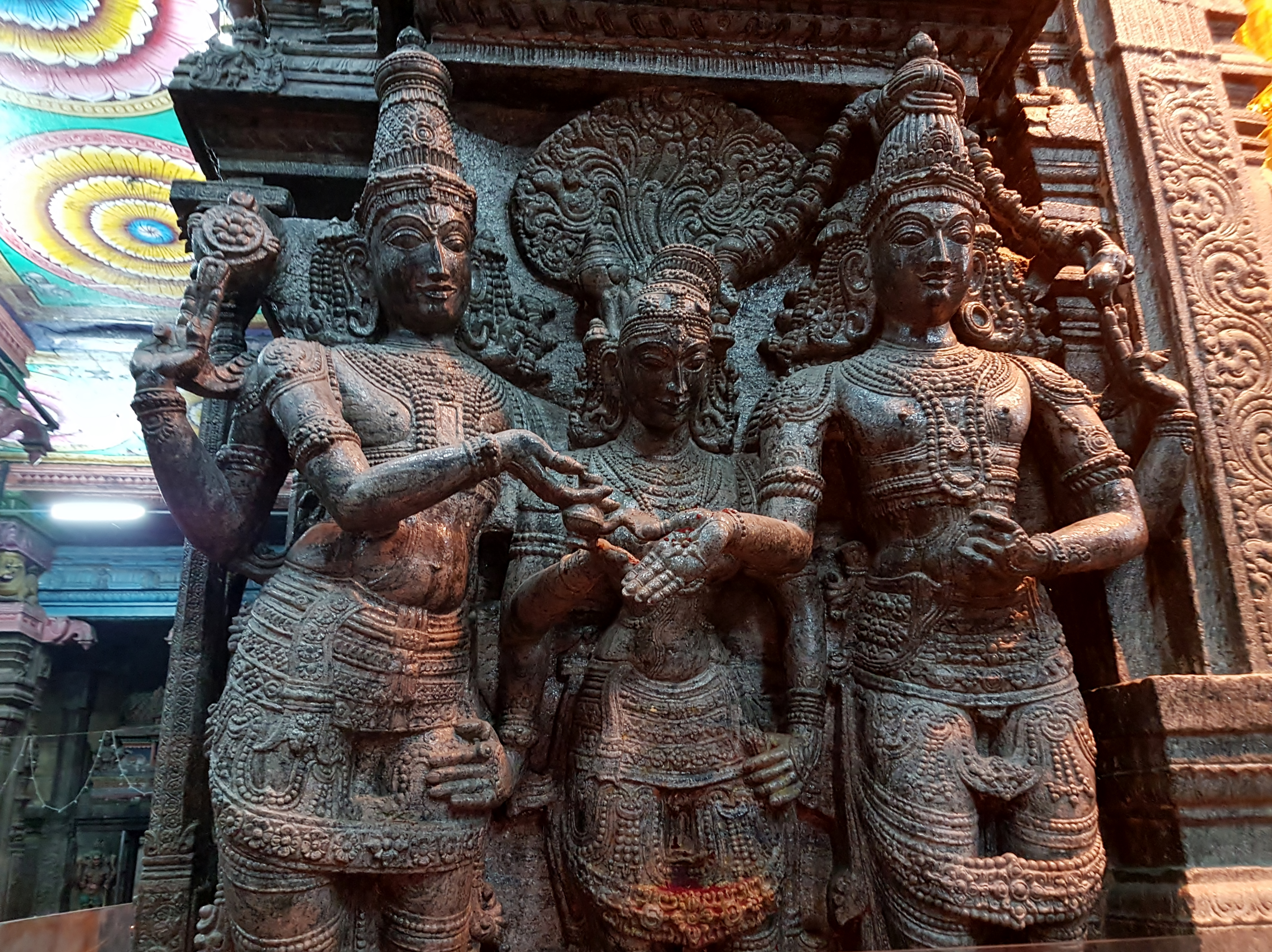
- Vishnu (left) gives Meenakshi's (centre) hand in marriage to Shiva (right).
- Observed by: Hindu Tamils
- Type: Hindu
- Significance: Commemoration of the wedding of Shiva and Meenakshi, coronation of Meenakshi as queen of Madurai
- Celebrations: car festivals, wedding festival, coronation ceremony
- Observances: Puja in Meenakshi Temple, Prayers for Meenakshi
- Date: During the Tamil month of Chithirai
- Duration: 15 day
- Frequency: Annual

The Meenakshi Tirukalyanam festival, also known as Chithirai Tiruviḻa or Meenakshi Kalyanam, is an annual Tamil Hindu celebration in the city of Madurai during the month of April. The festival, celebrated during the Tamil month of Chithirai, is associated with the Meenakshi Temple, dedicated to the goddess Meenakshi, a form of Parvati and her consort Sundareshvara, a form of Shiva.

The festival lasts for one month. The first 15 days mark the celebrations of the coronation of Meenakshi as the divine ruler of Madurai and her marriage to Sundareshvara. The next 15 days mark the celebrations of the journey of Kallaḻagar or Aḻagar (a form of the god Vishnu) from his temple to Meenakshi Amman Temple in Madurai.

== Legend ==
As per the legend, Meenakshi was the daughter of the Pandya king Malayadhvaja Pandyan and queen Kanchana Malai. The royal couple did not have a child for a long time, so Malayadhvaja Pandyan performed special pujas and offered his prayers seek a son. During the puja, a 3-year-old girl emerged from the fire and sat on the lap of the king, bearing three breasts. At that time, a divine voice from the sky told them that this child was an incarnation of Parvati (the wife of Shiva), and Shiva himself would come to marry her at the right age. Meenakshi was trained in warfare, and she was crowned as the queen of the Pandya kingdom after her father died. She conquered the whole world with her extraordinary war skills, and at last she went to Kailasha (the abode of Shiva) to conquer it. When Meenakshi confronted Shiva in the battlefield, she fell in love with him and realized that she was a form of Parvati. Her third breast fell upon meeting him. Shiva assured Meenakshi that he would come to Madurai to marry her. As promised, Shiva, along with all the gods and the sages, came to Madurai. Shiva as Sundareshvara married Meenakshi and ruled the Pandya kingdom under the name Sundara Pandyan. Their temple stands at the centre of Madurai.

The Aḻagar festival is associated with the Vaishnava Kallaḻagar temple. Once, the sage Manduka was taking a bath in the holy waters of the Agaya Gangai in Aḻagar hills. At that time, the short tempered sage, Durvasa, came by that way. Manduka missed his arrival, which Durvasa took as an insult and cursed Manduka to become a frog and live in the river Vaigai. On Manduka's beeseaching, Durvasa told him to go to Vaigai and pray to the Aḻagar form of Vishnu to be released from the curse. Aḻagar was pleased by the prayers of Manduka, and went to the Vaigai river to lift the curse of Manduka. As per Manduka's wish, he showed him all his ten avatars and blessed him.

The wedding of Meenakshi with Sundareshvara was to happen in Madurai. Aḻagar, the brother of Meenakshi, was invited. He started on a 20 km journey from his abode at Aḻagar Hills towards Madurai. Aḻagar decided to travel disguised as a robber to protect himself and his belongings. At times, he had to hide to avoid getting arrested by soldiers. This, and the dense forest of Aḻagar Hills, delayed his journey further. This delay was purposely caused by Sundareshvara, and he himself took the form of Aḻagar and performed the kanyadana (handing over a girl for marriage) of Meenakshi. This was enacted by Sundareshvara to prove that Vishnu and Shiva are one and the same. Later, when Aḻagar was crossing the Vaigai river, he learned that his sister's wedding was over. This made him furious. To pacify him, Meenakshi and Sundareshvara came to the Vaigai river. Aḻagar chose to give all the gifts that he carried to Meenakshi and Sundareshvara in a mandapa in the middle of the Vaigai river, and returned to Aḻagar Hills without entering Madurai.

== History ==
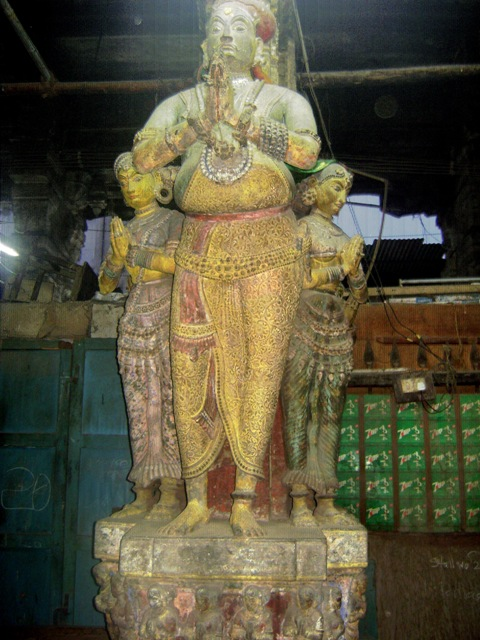
Tirumala Nayaka gave shape to the Chithirai festival.

Historically, the Meenakshi festival related to Shaiva sect was celebrated separately in the Masi month and the Aḻagar festival of the Vaishnava sect in the Chithirai month of the Tamil Calendar. Both festivals were merged into a single event to unite the people of the two Hindu sects (Shaiva and Vaishnava) as well as to boost Madurai's economy, under the rule of Tirumala Nayaka.

The location of culminating event of Aḻagar festival - the entering of the river by Aḻagar - was also moved from Thenur village to Madurai.

== List of events ==
The following are the list of events in the Tirukalyanam festival.

=== Kodi Yetram ===
"Kodi yetram" literally means "raising the flag". During this event, the chief priest of the Meenakshi temple hoists the holy flag (kodi) on the dhvaja stambham (flag pole) of the temple. This marks the beginning of the festival. The flag stays on the flag pole until the end of the festival.

=== Pattabhishekam ===
"Pattabhishekam" means "coronation". Meenakshi is crowned as the queen of Madurai on this day, and she is regarded to rule the Pandya Kingdom for the next four months. After this ceremony, her husband Sundareshvara is crowned as the king of Madurai for the next eight months.

=== Digvijayam ===
Digvijayam refers to the conquests of Meenakshi. After Meenakshi is crowned as the queen of the Pandya kingdom, she goes into war with all the countries in the world and conquers the whole world. Then, she goes to Kailasha (the home of Shiva in Himalayas) to conquer it. However, after seeing Shiva on the battlefield, she falls in love with him and marries him.

=== Meenakshi Kalyanam ===
Meenakshi Kalyanam is the wedding ceremony of Meenakshi and Shiva (Sundareshvara) in Madurai. On the day of Meenakshi Kalyanam, devotees get up at sunrise and reach the Meenakshi temple in Madurai. After taking a holy dip in the golden lotus pond, they wear clean clothes. Meenakshi is first worshipped using traditional methods, following which prayers are offered to Vibhuti Vinayakar. On this day, devotees sing devotional songs and bhajans. It is also considered auspicious to wear the holy ash known as vibhuti while entering the temple premises. Devotees also carry fruits, coconuts and incense sticks to offer to the deities. Inside the temple, the images of the deities are decorated with silk clothes and floral garlands. There are nearly 50 priests in the Meenakshi Madurai temple who perform the puja rituals and special prayers. The main priests in the temple perform the ritualistic wedding ceremonies. At the completion of the event, images of Meenakshi and Sundareshvara are taken out in huge processions on the streets in the Pushpa Pallakku and Yanai Vahanam.

=== Chariot festival ===
The Chariot festival, also known as Ter Tiruviḻa or Rathotsavam, is performed the day after Meenakshi Kalyanam. The king and queen of the Pandya Kingdom, Meenakshi and Sundareshvara come to see their subjects in a well-decorated ther (chariot). It attracts many people in the Masi streets of Madurai as viewers.

=== Ethir Sevai ===
"Ethir sevai" refers to a welcoming ceremony. Part of the Chithirai Tiruviḻa of Kallazhagar temple at Aḻagar Koyil, the Ethir Seva begins on the fourth day of the festival. On this day, Aḻagar changes his appearance into a Kallar man (Kallar vedam) to travel via Kallar Nadu (the Kallar country) and enter Madurai; the people of the city welcome him.

=== Alagar Vaigai Yeluntarulutal ===
"Alagar Vaigai Yeluntarulutal" literally means "Alagar blessing people in the Vaigai". A re-enactment of the scene of Vishnu refusing to enter Madurai and returning to Alagar Koil, tis event occurs in a mandapam in Madhichiyam in the middle of river Vaigai.

=== Devendra Puja ===
The Devendra Puja is held at the fourteenth and final day of the Chithirai festival in honour of Indra at the Meenakshi Temple at Madurai.
