= Siddha Bhairavi =

Temple in India

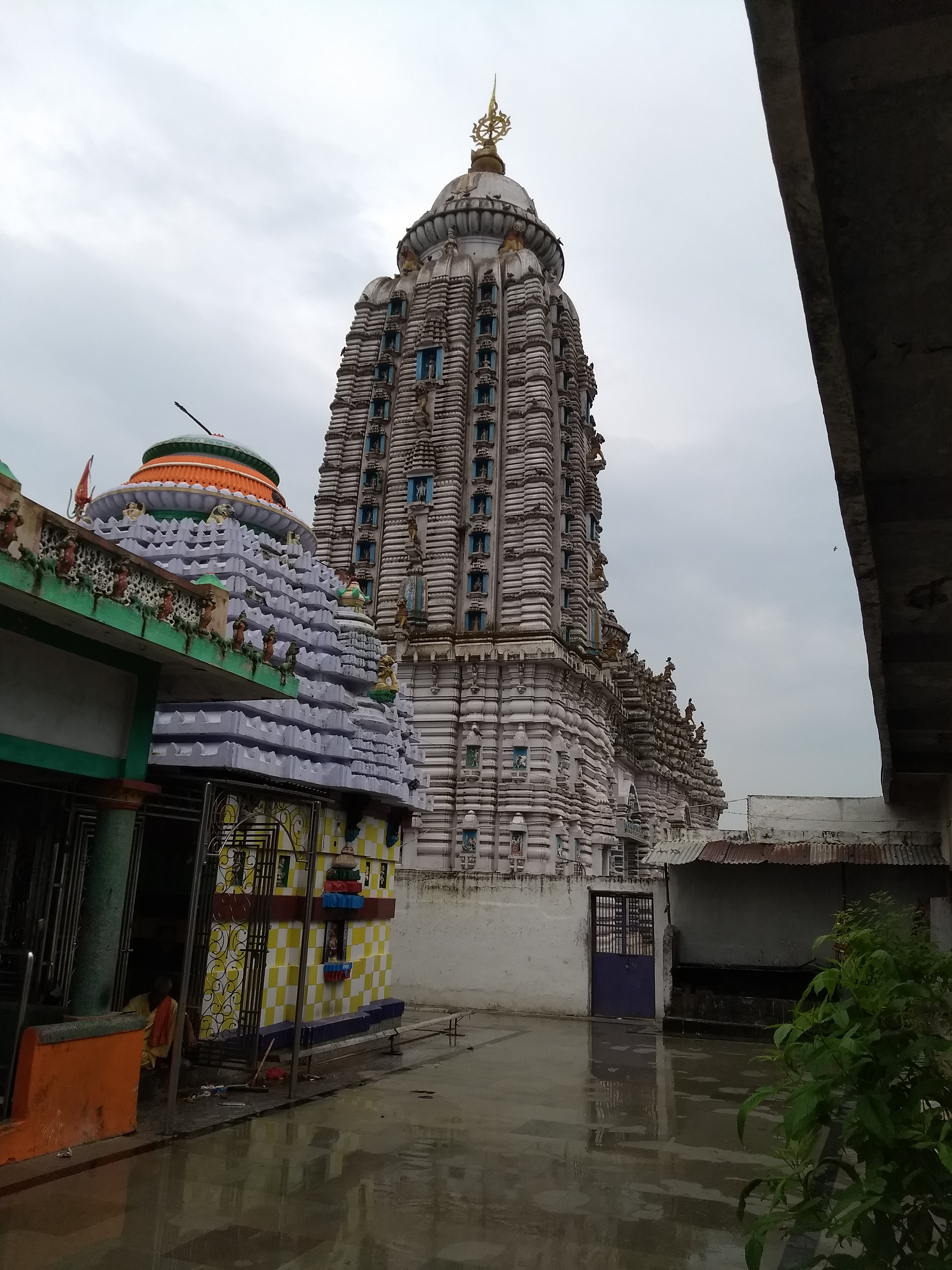
Siddha Bhairavi temple, Mantridi, Odisha

Siddha Bhairavi temple is a shrine situated at Mantridi in Ganjam district of Odisha India. The presiding deity is the goddess Bhairavi. Carved in crude fashion, the idol features one leg and four hands. It is said that this idol was excavated from a ploughed field. and was enshrined as such in a new temple in 1937. All the Sankranti days in every month of the Hindu calendar and Tuesdays are considered auspicious here.

The temple is on National Highway 16, about 18 kilometres (11 mi) from Berhampur. Berhampur railway station is the nearest railhead.

== Other attractions ==
The temple houses 108 sub shrines dedicated to all Hindu gods present from Kashmir to Kanyakumari like the 12 jyotirlingas, Vaishno Devi, Dashavatara, Venkateswara, Ranganatha, Meenakshi, Badrinath. A big shrine is also present which houses Lord Jagannath along with his siblings. It is believed that at the end of Kali Yuga, Bhairavi devi will accompany Kalki Avatar in restoring Dharma.
