= Alagar Kovil =

Village in Madurai district, Tamil Nadu, India

- Village
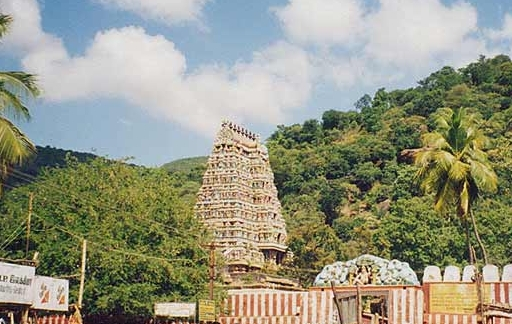
- Interactive map of Alagar Kovil
- Coordinates: 10°04′29.45″N 78°12′47.15″E
- Country: India
- State: Tamil Nadu
- District: Madurai
- Elevation: 266 m (873 ft)

Languages
  - Official: Tamil
- Time zone: UTC+5:30 (IST)

Alagar Kovil is a village in Madurai district in the South Indian state of Tamil Nadu. The village is centered around Kallalagar Temple. Constructed in the Tamil architecture, the temple is glorified in the Nalayira Divya Prabandham, the early medieval Tamil canon of the Alvar saints from the 6th–9th centuries CE. It is one of the 108 Divya Desams dedicated to Vishnu, who is worshiped as Kallalagar and his consort Lakshmi as Tirumamagal.

== Kallalagar Temple ==
Kallalagar Temple covers an area of about 2 acres (0.81 ha) and has a five-tiered gopuram (gateway tower). The temple is enclosed in a rectangular enclosure with large granite walls. The central shrine houses the image of the presiding deity, Sundarabahu Perumal in standing posture. The images of Sridevi and Bhudevi are also housed in the sanctum. There are two life size images of Narasimha, the avatar of Vishnu. One of them is shown holding the asura Hiranyakasipu and other slaying him.

The temple houses various sculptures dated to the Vijayanagara period. The temple has an idol of Chakaratalvar, who is represented with 16 hands holding various weapons, and is not accompanied by Narasimha.

=== Chithirai festival ===
Chithirai festival is an annual festival celebrated during the month of Chithirai. During the festival, Kallalagar is taken on a procession from Alagar Kovil and reaches Madurai on Pournami (Full Moon day). During Ethir Sevai, Alagar changes his appearance as a Kallar and enters Madurai. The god is taken on a ceremonial dip to the Vaigai river, in a horse mount. The Dashavatara of Vishnu is enacted throughout the night at Ramarayar Mandapam, located to the north of Vaigai. After this event, Alagar is taken to Mysore Veera Mandapam on decorated Anantharayar palanquin. The next morning, Alagar returns to Alagar kovil in 'poo pallakku' (palanquin decorated with flowers).

During the month of Aadi, the brahmotsavam festival is being celebrated for ten days. This festival occurs within the precincts of the temple, and the temple car is taken in procession during Pournami.

== Transport ==
Alagar Kovil is connected by road to Madurai and Melur. Tamil Nadu State Transport Corporation operates buses to the village. The nearest major railway station is Madurai Junction, and the nearest airport is Madurai International airport. Taxis and auto rickshaws also operate to the location.
