= Thiruvilaiyadal Puranam =

Shaivite devotional epic stories by Paranjothi

The Thiruvilaiyadal Puranam (Tamil: திருவிளையாடல் புராணம்; transl. Legend of the Sacred Game) is a collection of sixty-four Shaivite devotional epic stories by the sage Paranjothi Munivar composed and collected before the 12th Century. They describe the actions of Shiva on earth in a number of disguises to test and help his devotees.

== Contents ==
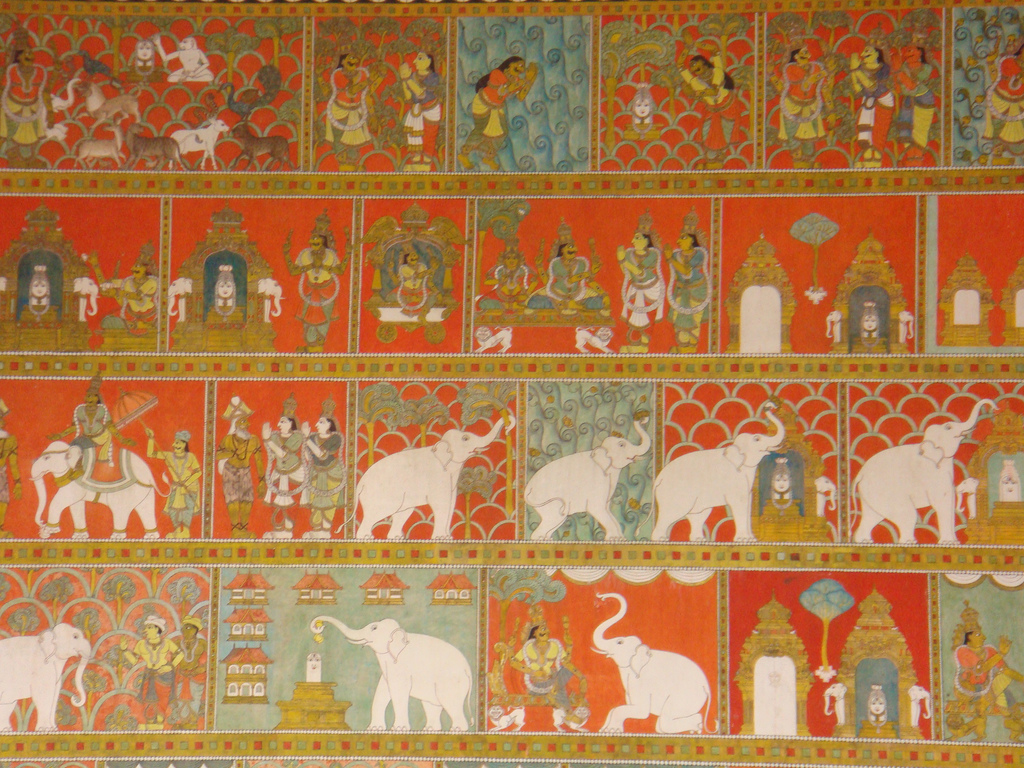
A painting in Madurai Meenakshi temple; the top two layers describe the removal of Indra's sin while the bottom two layers describes Airavata (Indra's mount) worshipping the Lingam to remove his own curse

There are sixty-four stories in the Thiruvilaiyadal Puranam. It is divided into three cantos, namely Maduraikandam, Koodarkandam and Thirualavaikandam. Thiruvilaiyadal Puranam is viewed to be one of the 18 thalapuranas. It is also revered as one of the Mahapuranas (Periya Puranam – the right eye of Shiva, Thiruvilaiyadal Puranam – the left eye, and Kanda Purana – the third eye). It was authored by Saint Paranjothi. It narrates the 64 Tiruvilayadals (Lilas in Sanskrit), loosely translated as the "playful miracles of god (Shiva) himself". It describes the legends and prevalent in the Pandyan Kingdom in South India and covers a period of more than 500 years during the reign of fifty-two Pandya kings and six other kings. Shiva and his consort Meenakshi gave salvation to the kings and commoners alike in these sixty- four episodes. Many of these events are found in earlier Tamil works like Cilappatikaram, Kalladam, Tevaram, Tiruvasagam and some other Puranic poetry.

Some of the stories in the text are versions of the original legend which may not mention the presents of Shiva:

=== 1. The removal of Indra's crime ===
Indra, the king of the devas and Svarga (heaven), was engaged in spending time with apsaras (divine female celestials) in his abode, when his guru (spiritual preceptor) Brihaspati came to see him. Indra did not pay proper attention to the guru, causing Brihaspati to depart in anger with a curse. Indra thus lost all his prosperity and the sympathy of his guru. Having no longer his former preceptor, Indra took a three-headed asura (similar to Trisiras) for his preceptor, but inducing him to make a sacrifice (yajna), he learned bitterly that the new guru purposed to destroy the gods and favour his clan. Therefore, Indra killed him whereby he incurred the sin of brahmahatya (crime of killing a Brahmin). The father (Tvashtr) of the deceased asura took revenge by making a yajna, from which Vritra sprang out and was ordered to kill Indra immediately. Indra came face-to-face with the asura, but finding that he could not kill him, hid himself in a lotus flower. He then went to Brahma and enquired why he could not kill the asura, whereby he was told that his weapon was not strong enough to kill the demon and was directed to a place where an old Brahmin named Tatichi had long been performing penance, and was advised to take his shoulder-bone, which would suffice for the object in view; since it was moulded of a good number of powerful weapons that were entrusted to him. The old Brahmin gladly gave up his life and Indra, taking his shoulder-bone by its aid killed the asura, hereby the brahmahatya was doubled; and in consequence of its burden, Indra again concealed himself in a lotus flower. The devas were thus left without a king, and Nahusha, an earthly monarch, who in order to arrive at the dignity had performed a hundred yajnas, became entitled to take the place of Indra. Accordingly, he sent word to Indrani, the consort of the Indra, that he was coming, directing her to prepare to receive him. On this message being communicated, she went in consternation to the guru, Brihaspati, to ask his advice, who directed her to sanction the coming of Nahusha in the palanquin of Indra, according to custom borne by the seen rishis. While Nahusha was thus going, owing to his hurry, he exclaimed to the rishis, "Sarpa sarpa", which means "quickly quickly". The rishis being displeased, put down the palanquin, and pronounced on him a curse "that he should become a serpent" (as "Sarpa" also means snake); in which shape he fell down again back to the earth. A council was held with Brihaspati, Agastiyar, and other sages, where they concluded in their meeting that Indra, in order to the removal of his sin, should go down to the earth to visit the sacred places and bathe in the holy rivers. Indra thus followed but found no relief until he came to a certain forest of lili (Kadamba) trees, where he suddenly he found his burden removed. Being surprised at this, he commanded a search to be made around, where a lingam (the emblem of Shiva) was found under a lili tree, to which he made puja (worship) to it. The forest's plants had no flowers with which to make garlands; but on search for them Indra saw a tank with lotus flowers of which he made garlands. By the use of its flowers, the tank obtained the name Pottamarai (the golden lotus).

=== 2. The removal of the white elephant's curse ===
Durvasa-rishi was once worshipping the said image in the Tilivanam, when he took lotus flowers, and after presenting it to the god, carried it with him to Indra's paradise, who was then riding on his white elephant, and going to encounter the giants. He respectfully gave it to Indra, who laid it on the head of the elephant between its tusks but the animal threw it down and trampled it under foot. Durvasa pronounced on it a curse, to the effect, "that it should become a wild elephant of the woods"; but as the animal implored mercy, the period was limited to a hundred years. In consequence, while the elephant was in the tili forest, it one day poured water over the lingam, which on enquiry, learning the nature of the case, told the elephant to place as Indra-lingam at Airavatham. Having done so, a messenger came to recall it to Indra's abode, and the proposition being declined on the plea of worshipping at this place, another messenger was sent in obedience to which recall, the elephant went and again became the vahana (vehicle) of Indra.

=== 3. Discovery of Shiva to the locals; building the town Of Madurai and the reign of the first king ===
In the time of Kulashekhara Pandya, who ruled in Manavur, a merchant named Tanan-shayen, in the course of his journeys on commercial business was benighted in a forest of Kadamba trees; and being unable to proceed further took up his abode at the foot of one of them. He was surprised at the sight of an unusual splendour; and going to look, was favoured by the god with the view, as he had been very virtuous in his former birth. As it was Monday, the gods were performing homage and anointing the image, as though it had been the night of Shiva. The merchant bathed in a tank and worshipped; when the gods had disappeared, he saw the stone image only; and the next day went and told the king and told what he had seen. The god also appeared to the king the following night by a vision, in the form of a religious ascetic, and commanded him to build a temple in the aforesaid wilderness. The king finding the vision and the statement of the merchant to accord, went to the place and had the forest cleared. Being uncertain how to build the temple and town, he had another vision which the god appeared and gave instructions, in obedience to which, workmen were employed, having a king's street, Brahmin's street and also choultries, mandapams, tanks and do on. The whole being splendidly finished, with a palace also for the king on the North-East quarter, an embarrassment arose as to how these numerous buildings could all be purified preparatory to residence at once, so as to ensure an entrance on an auspicious day; the difficulty the god Shiva was pleased to remove by causing Ganga, abiding in the hair on his head to pour forth copious streams on the whole place: and the god was pleased to give it the name of Mathura (or sweetness), and he then disappeared. The king placed guards at the four cardinal points of the city, four of them being devas. Afterwards a son was born to him, named Malayadhvajan, who on the King's death succeeded to the throne.

=== 4. Incarnation of Meenakshi, the goddess of the temple ===
Malayadhvaja-Pandyan although he had many wives, the chief of them being Kanjana-malai, daughter of the Chola king, had no child. In consequence he offered ninety-nine ashvamedha (horse) sacrifices, when Indra, becoming alarmed (since another sacrifice, would entitle the king to the Indra's throne), appeared to him and said, "Why do you give yourself this trouble? Perform the appointed sacrifice for obtaining a child before the temple of the god Shiva, and your wish will be granted." While the king was making the sacrifice, a young girl named Meenakshi of three years, covered with ornaments, was formed from the flame of the sacrificial fire pit. The king took up the child, and gave it into the hands of his wife Kanjana-Malai. On her applying the infant to her breast immediately milk for its nourishment first manifested itself. While bringing up the child it was found that she had three breasts, on which the foster-parents being afflicted, the voice of the god was heard from heaven, bidding them to give the child the same education as for a man, and adding, that when her appointed husband would come, then the third breast would disappear: when she was grown up they had her formally installed on the throne, and then Malayadhvajan died. Having performed, in becoming manner, the funeral rites for her foster parent, and worshipped in the temple, she afterwards ruled the kingdom in a proper manner.

=== 5. Marriage of Meenakshi with Shiva, by the name of Sundaresvara ===
When the above woman, Tadatakai (or Invincible) was ruling, her foster-mother represented to her the property of marriage, to which she replied, that she would assemble an army and go to fight with neighbouring kingdoms, in order to discover among them her destined husband. Accordingly, her minister, Sumati, assembled a very large army, with which she went and conquered all the neighbouring kings. She next conquered Indra, and then proceeded to attack Kailasha (the abode of Shiva) in front of which she was met by Narada, (the messenger of the god.) whom she forced to retreat. He left and reported the same to Shiva. The god who arose and went forth. As soon as he appeared, the before mentioned sign occurred, at which the Shakti, being ashamed, dropped her weapons, and the minister said, "This has to be your husband." The god told her to return to Madurai, where he dwelt, and on Monday he would come and marry her; desiring all preparations to be made. All was arranged accordingly and the other deities came bringing presents. She was seated beside Shiva on the marriage on a throne, when Vishnu joined their hands, and afterwards the marriage ceremony was performed, amidst the praises and adorations of the rishis and others present. The god then had a new stone image made for the pagoda, as he became a king; and afterwards ruled over Madurai by the name of Sundara.

=== 6. Shiva's dance in the silver hall ===
After the marriage, the Gods, rishis, and others who were assembled were about to be feasted, preparatory to which they all bathed in the Pottamarai-tank, (the tank of the golden lotus) when one of the rishis said, "Unless we see the god dance we will not eat." The god replied, "How can you expect to see one dance, whose form is that of the seven superior and seven inferior worlds, and whose members are the places most famous for their shrines and temples? But, as this place is chief of all, since you wish it, you shall see me dance." The god thus danced, while the guests present sang praises and songs to him.

=== 7. The insatiable Kundotharan ===
After the marriage feast was over, the chief of the palace came and said to the goddess, "Out of the vast quantity of food which you have prepared scarcely one part out of a thousand has been consumed: what are we to do with the rest?" The goddess went to enquire her husband, who said, "It is true, that being a queen, you have prepared so much food, but there are several of my retinue as yet unfed." Whereupon calling a dwarf, named Kundotharan, he directed food to be given; saying, that when he should be satisfied, others would follow. He then put within him Vadamugagni (a great fire said to govern the sea). A large pit was dug to receive the various eatables. The dwarf was emaciated with hunger and fasting; and consumed mountains of prepared food so rapidly, that the eye could not follow him. All being gone, he consumed the unprepared materials for food, and still complained of hunger. On this the goddess enquired of her husband what was to be done, saying. '"It is thus that you fulfil your character of the final destroyer of all things." At this the god smiled with complacency, only complaining that so many of his hungry followers were still left without food.

=== 8. Ganga, at the command of Shiva, produced the river Vaigai ===
As the hunger of the dwarf was yet unappeased, the god commanded the Earth (a goddess) to supply him. Accordingly, four holes or pits appeared, out of which food spontaneously arose; and the dwarf ate until his body became swollen. He then complained of thirst; and having drawn all the water contained in the wells and tanks, he still complained of thirst. On this the god commanded the goddess Ganga (in his hair) to supply water. She replied. 'You once called me before, and I will come again if you only grant the privilege that whatsoever bathes in my waters shall be purified from sin:" which being conceded, she brought a most plentiful supply of water in the shape of the river Vaigai and the dwarf took it all very easily. And now, both hunger and thirst being satisfied, he returned to his duty in the retinue of the god.

=== 9. The seven seas in one place ===
Among the rishis who came to greet the god was Gautama, who went to pay his respects to Kanjana-malai, queen dowager, she asked him which was the most excellent penance. He replied, "there are three: one consisting in silently contemplating the deity, one in repeating prayers, and one in going about and bathing in all the sacred rivers; of which three, the last was the most excellent: but that since it was attended with much trouble to visit all the rivers, and since all the rivers run into the sea, if she bathed in the sea, the effect would be the same." On this she announced to her adopted daughter her intention of bathing in the sea, and the daughter, unwilling to part with her foster-mother, told her own husband; who said, "To bathe in one sea is a trifle; I will bring all the seven seas together to one place, and she may bathe there." Accordingly, much to the astonishment of the people, the seven seas (of ghee, honey, milk, &c.) came rushing into one tank, still retaining their respective colours, and appearing distinct and unmingled.

=== 10. Resurrecting Malayadhvaja from the dead ===
On the banks of the said tank the god made a flower garden, and when there one day, said to his wife, "Why does not your foster-mother bathe?" On this being reported the elder lady enquired of learned men the most meritorious mode of bathing. They replied, "It must be either by taking hold of the hand of a husband, a child or of a cow's tail." On this reply being given she became greatly afflicted, having neither husband, nor child. Her foster-daughter reported this grief to the god, who, by an act of volition, brought back Malayadhvaja Pandyan from the paradise of Indra, and the shade, on coming, presented his respects to the god. Kanjana-malai hearing the arrival of her former husband, came adorned with jewels, and both bathed in the tank; after which they saw the god, and a heavenly vimana (chariot) appeared in which both husband and wife were together carried above the worlds and the paradise of Indra, safe into the heaven of Shiva.

=== 11. The incarnation of Subramanyan in the form of Ukrama-Pandyan ===
One day the aforesaid Tadatha-kai came to her husband, and said, "You have assembled the seven seas, and have procured the beatification of my reputed parents. But now it occurs to me that it is not worthy after your reign that the Pandyan race should become extinct through want of issue." Shiva, whose height and depth Brahma and Vishnu could not discover, reflected that he had caused his wife (Parvati) to become incarnated in the person of Thadatha-kai, and had now himself reigned a long time as Sundareshvarar, considered it was not right to leave the Pandyan race without offspring. And by a simple volition he produced in due time the birth of his son Subramanyan, in the form of a child bearing the resemblance of Shiva, which event occurred on Monday in the Tiruvatirai nakshatra, when the planet Jupiter was in the most fortunate station of a good house, (astrological term). On hearing the news, all kings and people came and made congratulations on the event, gave presents to the town, and according to the Vedas, cast the child's nativity (horoscope), giving the child the name of Ukrama-Pandyan, and the child was afterwards instructed in all suitable accomplishments by Vihala-bhagavan (Brihaspati) the preceptor of the gods. When the son came to years of discretion, the father, hearing the fame of his great acquirements and excellent temper, told his ministers it was time to have him installed, or anointed as king, to which counsel they agreed with joy.

=== 12 . The god Sundaresvarar gets his son married and furnishes him with three weapons ===
The father besides gave orders to his ministers to procure his son a suitable wife of equal nobility. Kantimathi, the daughter of a king named Soma-sekaran, of the race of the Sun, who ruled in the town of Manavur, was selected. In the same night, Shiva appeared in vision to Soma-sekaran, and commanded him to give his daughter in marriage to the son of the king ruling in Madurai. Soma sekaran the next day, astonished and delighted, set out for Madurai with his daughter and a great retinue; and was met on the road by the ministers of Sundaresvarar that were going towards Manavur, who demanded his daughter in marriage for the son of their king. He gladly agreed and after coming to Madurai, the ceremony was performed; the Sora and Sera kings, gods, demi-gods, and innumerable others were in attendance, with all usual accompaniments and great presents, extensive dower, and largesses were bestowed. After the marriage ceremony, the father gave the son a spear, a discus, a ball and said, "Indran, Maha-meru, and the sea, are your foes: with the spear, you shall overcome the sea; with the ball, you shall conquer Maha meru; and with the discus, subdue Indran. He then charged the ministers to take care of his son as the apple of their eyes; and enjoined his son to follow the advice of his ministers, and to break no old custom. He then gave the new married pair his blessings. He, along with Tadathakai entered an aerial car while his attendants became changed into the forms of the celestials of Kailasa. He then ascended to his own paradise. The son ruled the kingdom, according to the Law of Manu (Mansusmriti) afterwards.

=== 13. Varuna is compelled to retire by the casting of the Spear (Javelin) ===
Ukrama Pandyan made a great sacrifice of ninety-six ashvamedha yajnas (rituals), at which Indra became jealous (since his rule was endangered), went to the king of the sea, Varuna, and asked him to destroy the country. Accordingly, the sea suddenly came with great noise in the middle of the night to the gates of Madurai, when the king, Ukrama Pandyan, was awakened by Shiva in the guise of a religious ascetic, informed him of the circumstance and attendant dangers. The king, being astonished and without presence of mind, was urged by the vision to lose no time, but employ the vel, as he had been directed and accordingly went and cast the spear (or javelin) at the sea, which immediately lost its force, and retired, as Varunan recognised the weapon of his superior. The king then went to the temple, adoring Shiva, promised that as far as the sea had come, so much land would be given to the temple.

=== 14. Ukrama-Pandyan strikes off Indra's crown ===
While Ukrama Pandyan reigned, it happened, by the evil influence of the nine planets, that there was no rain, and consequent by a great drought occurred in the Pandyan, Sora and Sera kingdoms. On which deficiency, these three kings went and consulted the sage Agastya, residing on the great mountain called Pothiya, who told them of the evil influence of the planets, and advised them to go and worship Sundaresravarar on Monday. Accordingly, the three kings came to Madurai, and performed the prescribed fastings and ceremonies on Monday in the temple, when, by the favour of Shiva, they were carried to Swarga logam (the paradise of Indra). The Sora and Sera kings took their seats at his footstool and asking for rain, were favourably answered and dismissed. But the Pandyan took his seat on the same level with Indra, and made no request. Indra, displeased with a semblance of favour, put round his neck a very heavy necklace collar, such as five men could not lift, thinking its weight would crush his uncivil guest. However, as the Pandyan wore it without any emotion, Indra was astonished and dismissed him, only saying, "You shall be called the bearer of the necklace." On the Pandyan's return, he found that in his country only there was no rain. He in consequence of which he went to Mahameru, and put some of the clouds round its summit in chains, brought them to water his kingdom. Indra incensed at this violation of his proper power, declared war, and took the field at the head of large forces. There was much fighting on both sides, and many were slain, until Ukrama Pandyan with his discus which struck off Indra's crown. Indra, astonished, found he was not combating with a mere mortal, and sent ambassadors, promising to bestow rain. Ukrama did not believe him; in consequence Indra sent a man of the Vellala caste to become security for rain, (hence called காரைக்காத்தவெள்ளாளர், waiters for rain). The king then released the clouds from confinement. Afterwards, by Indra's command, there was abundance of rain with consequent fertility.

=== 15. Ukrama-Pandyan strikes Mount Meru and thus obtains wealth ===
Ukrama Pandyan was attentive to the instructions of Agastya in the religious observance of Monday; and by that means his wife, Kantimathi, brought him a son, whom he named Vira Pandyan. At this time the country was distressed by drought, and Shiva, on being besought appeared in a dream, said, "Go to Mahameru and strike it with the ball. There are riches inside, which can be used as charitable donations, and rain will come." Rising in the morning, and going to pay his devotions to the god, the king set out with a great retinue; thus leaving his own country and going to salute the Soren king: passing thence by Dundaga nada, the Telinga, Carnataca and Tondaga countries; crossing mountains and rivers; passing Malava, Virada and Motthiya countries; going as far as Casi (Benares); crossing the Ganges and a desert untrodden by human foot-steps, which is inhabited by yalis, lions etc., he arrived at Kumeri, which extends one thousand leagues (of ten miles each); passing by which, and also Barathi, eight times larger still, he arrived at the birthplace of Parvati, (or mountain-born), named Mount Imaut. Next crossing Kimpurada province as also Arri-varadum and the Nisithi mountains, and arriving at Ilavu-vritha country, surrounded by the river Jemba, he obtained a view of Maha-meru, which is the support of the earth, having one thousand and eight peaks, which is also the pillar of the gods, and which besides was once a bow in the hands of Sihva. As it is a sacred land, he halted his retinue at a distance, made by himself a circuit of the mountain, and standing on the South, addressed its king, saying "O Meru! surrounded by all planets, constellations, and demi-gods-O mountain king! attend!" Then, taking the ball in his hand, he struck the mountain with anger: the mountain reeled; the peaks trembled, and the king of the mountain, with one head and four umbrella-bearing arms, came forth ashamed; confessed a dereliction of attention and of duty for that one day from the service of Shiva, and asked what was his business? The reply was, 'Riches are wanted." All that he desired was given him by opening a mine; and the cleft was closed with his own royal seal. He brought the load of precious metals on elephants to Madurai. And as he there gave largely to the Brahmins, the Shaivas, the temples etc., rain came down as formerly, and the country was again fertile. He flourished forty thousand years of the gods; after which, crowning Vira-Pandyan, and delivering to him the kingdom, Ukrama Pandyan resumed the unchangeable form of Shiva.

=== 16. Shiva explains the inner meaning of the Vedas ===
After the destruction of all things by the deluge, when the Vedas were produced by the word of god, the rishis and Brahmins were embarrassed to know their meaning. Hence they applied to Harra-pakthi (worshipper of Shiva), who directed them to go to Madurai and learn from Sundareshvarar. Accordingly, after coming thither and bathing in the golden-lotus tank, they were met by Shiva, who told them that to worship the self-existing lingam (or stone image), which was the sum and substance of the Vedas. He then explained the issuing of the twenty-eight books of the Shiva sect, from the centre mouth of Shiva; and the Rig, Sama, Yajur and Atharva Vedas, from the other four mouths. moreover, stating that the sense of the Vedas was difficult to be made out, and of no very great consequence, he told them the real secret was the duty of worshipping the lingam, a secret unknown to Brahma or Vishnu and charging on them due performance of his instructions, he gave them his blessing. The Rishis and Brahmis then sung praises to the god for condescending, by so brief a process, to instruct them in the true sense of the Vedas

=== 17. Shiva provides jewels for the crown ===
While Vira-Pandyan ruled, he had many inferior wives who had children, but the legitimate queen was without offspring; until, by performing penance to the god, the queen was delivered of a son, concerning whom all the customary astrological ceremonies were performed. Afterwards the king, while hunting, was slain by a tiger; when the eldest of the concubines, thinking this to be the favourable time, stole the crown and royal jewels. After the grief of the ministers for the death of the king had somewhat subsided, they found the crown missing, and considering this to be the stratagem of an enemy, they were embarrassed on how to proceed. The god Sundereshvarar then came as a chetty (or merchant) and offered nine valuable jewels for sale, explaining that they were once the body of an asura named Vala. This giant, by performing penance to Shiva, had acquired power to conquer the inferior deities; and one day Indra offering to give him a gift, he jeered the king of demi-gods, as a conquered person offering gifts to the conqueror, and himself offered a gift to Indra; who then besought him to burn himself, in the shape of a cow, in a sacrifice that Indra was performing. He did so, when, according to a former promise of Shiva, different parts of the cow's body became inestimable jewels of different kinds and colours. The properties of these jewels were explained by the chetty, who gave them into the hands of the ministers, said, "Thank the god Shiva" and disappeared. They took the jewels, had a crown made, and with it crowned the young king, naming him Abhishekam (anointed). He recovered also the jewels which had been lost; and joyfully reigned over the kingdom.

=== 18. Varuna sends the sea to try Shiva's power; the latter called four clouds to absorb the sea ===
While Abisheka-Pandyan was performing puja, in the Chittra month, the camphor incense employed spread a great perfume. The god Indra was also desirous of performing homage; but was prevented by the Pandyan's previous service. On returning Indra was met by Varuna; he enquired the reason of his looking sorrowful: and on being informed of the vexatious disappointment, the god of the sea again asked, "Is then this lingam so great a god?" To which question Indra replied, "That as it had removed his former sin, and taken the curse from his white elephant, it is a great god" Varuna asked, "Can it cure the pain in my bowels?" The other answered "To do that would be an easy thing." Varuna feeling doubtful sent a large accumulation of seas to try the Shiva's power, which greatly alarmed the people of the kingdom. But the god commanded some clouds to descend from his head, which absorbed the seas; and the people now discerning that this was a sacred amusement of the god, rendered him praises.

=== 19. Varuna sends more rain storms, Shiva protected Madurai by a covering of clouds ===
Varuna being disappointed and angry, ordered seven clouds to go and pour down their contents for the destruction of Madurai. Accordingly, these clouds came, with threatening gloom, lightnings, and thunders, produced a deluge by sending rain with drops as large as pumpkins. The god seeing these things, ordered the before-mentioned clouds to interpose; which they accordingly did, and by spreading a covering above the town and beneath Varuna's clouds, prevented any more rain from falling. Varuna, now discerning the intervention of the god, went and bathed in the golden lotus tank, when his inward pain immediately ceased; on which he besought pardon to Shiva for his aforesaid misdemeanours and thanking Him for the removal of his pain, he returned to his abode. From that time forward Madurai acquired the title of "The assemblage of the four clouds."

=== 20. Sundaresar condescended to assume the form of a religious ascetic ===
It pleased Shiva to come to Madurai in the form of a Siddhar, with all the usual accompaniments of that order. He walked the royal and Brahmin streets, and performed various wonders. He brought distant mountains near and removed near ones far off. He made old females to become young children, and children to become old women. He changed sexes, made a barren fruitful and healed the hump-backed, the deaf, the dumb, the blind and the lame. He turned four metals into gold, made the rich become poor; and made enemies to be friends. He caused the yetti (poisonous shrub) to produce mangoes, and brought a flood in the river Vaigai. He turned fresh water into salt water, and made salt water fresh. He threw a pilgrim's staff into the air, threaded a cotton through it, and then, resting his head on the cotton thread, performed the attitude of penance (heels upward), while the staff remained in the air. He took clouds into his hands, and well wringing them, appeared to drink the water they contained. He caused things seen in the night (such as the stars) to be seen in the day, and things visible in the day to be seen at night. He taught the Vedas to things which could not understand them. He turned coconut trees into palmyra trees, and then the reverse, changed the species of other trees nd brought celestial things down to earth. While thus occupying the attention of the people, so that they neglected their employments, the Pandyan, hearing of the circumstances sent his ministers to call the performer of these wonders. The gave respects, but the Siddhar said, "What are kings to me?" and refused to go. The king on hearing of his refusal only replied, " What have the great (in a religious sense) to do with us?" and remained quiet.

=== 21. The Siddhar gives sugarcane to the Stone-Elephant ===
But still feeling a curiosity to see the Siddhar, the king went, accompanied by his retinue, as though he would visit the temple, and there he met with the performer. In reply to enquiries from the king, the Siddhar said, that he went about as he pleased, though more accustomed to be in Kasi; that he had displayed various feats in Chidambaram and other places, and here (at Madurai) especially. He replied that wanted nothing from the king, for though such men as might perform a few feats would receive offered royal rewards, yet he who could perform all things desired nothing. At this time a villager brought a sugar-cane and the king, expressing doubt, said pointing to a stone elephant sculptured on the tower of the temple, "If you can make that elephant eat this sugar-cane, then I shall admit that you can do all things, and must be our god Sunderesvarer." On this request being made the Siddhar glanced a side look at the elephant, which immediately gave signs of life; took the proffered sugar-cane from the hands of the king and ate it, and not being content with that, took the garland of pearls from the king's neck, and put it into his mouth. While the peons were busy in attempting to scare the elephant, the king fell at the feet of the Siddhar, worshipping him; who then looked again at the elephant, which immediately restored the string of pearls to the king. The Pandyan then received many gifts from the Siddhar; and after causing his son, Vicrama-Pandyan, to be crowned, he (Abhisheka-Pandyan) attained the lotus-feet of the god (that is, he died).

=== 22. Shiva kills the elephant which was made from the sacrificial fires by the Chamanals (Jains) ===
While Vicrama-Pandyan reigned, he drove away all heterodox sects, confirmed the established religion, built a temple for the Siddhar, and then ruled with justice and virtue. But a Chola king, who ruled in Kanchi-puri (Kanchipuram) and was of the Chamana faith, being resentful and treacherous and envious at the prosperity of the Pandyan kingdom, assembled together eight thousand of the sect of the Chamunals from Anjanam and other lofty mountains; and commanded them to make a sacrifice with a view to effect the destruction of the Pandyan king. Accordingly, they made a sacrifice, the limits of which for the attendance of people extended over thirty kadams (thirty miles), and the sacrificial pit itself occupied ten miles. Into this pit they poured margosa oil and gingelly oil, fruits of various kinds, and flesh of animals. From the fire a monstrous black elephant was produced, which the king commanded to go and to destroy Madurai. The elephant accordingly proceeded with great noise and rage, and the Chamunals followed. The Pandyan hearing of its approach supplicated Shiva, who said, "Never mind, build me a mandapa (small temple) and I will kill the elephant." Accordingly, a mandapa, having sixteen pillars, was built; and the god came to it in the guise of a hunter. When the elephant approached, he directed against it a rocket, of the kind called Narasimma-astiram, which struck the elephant in the head and killed it. The Chamanals were dispersed by the troops of the Pandyan, and such was the haste of the fugitives that their peacock-fans, their sleeping mats and drinking vessels, were broken to pieces. The spot became famous and was named Pracalataren by worshipping the arrow that was left sticking in the elephant mountain, obtained a celestial gift; and one named Romasen by worshipping, and forming a tank bearing his own name, also received a like gift. The elephant mountain remains to this time, and Narasimma-swami resides there. The Pandyan, praising the hunter god, and receiving from him many gifts returned to Madurai, had a son born to him, named Rajasekara Pandyan.

=== 23. Shiva, on the account of Gauri, becomes an old man, a young man, and a child respectively ===
While Vicrama-Pandyan ruled, there was a Brahmin couple named Virupatchi and Subavrithai, who were childless. After they worshipped the seven apsaras (fabled to be in Svarga, corresponding with the seven sages), they were blessed with a daughter. At five years old, the child, named Gauri, asked to be taught a prayer for the speedy change of her mortal form. The Brahmin, being surprised at her early good sense, taught her the Parvati mantra. While the father was waiting for a suitable husband, she passed the eighth year of her age without being betrothed, which was regarded to be unseemly. One day, a Vaishnava (follower of Vishnu) Brahmin came to beg alms. Gauri's father, perceiving him to be learned in the Vedas, bestowed the daughter on him in marriage, with the usual ceremony of gift, and without saying anything on the subject to any one. The neighbours, on learning the circumstances, first blamed him, but on further examination found no other fault than that the husband was a Vaishnava, and approved the marriage. When the Vaishnava Brahmin brought his wife to his parents, they disapproved of him marrying a Shaiva woman. Gauri, seeing nothing but Vaishnavas around her, without any Brahmins wearing ashes and beads, wishing to be with her own community. One day, her in-laws secluded her, and went away to a distant wedding feast without her. At this interval, an aged Shaiva Brahmin made his appearance, asking her for food. Being admitted into the house and food being given by the woman, since he was too infirm to feed himself, she assisted him to eat. He suddenly changed to a young man, richly habited; and on surprise being expressed by the Brahmin, as also fear with reference to the return of the husband's parents, the young man suddenly became a child. The parents having returned, and finding her with a young Shaiva child, turned both out of doors; and while she was in the street, sorrowing deeply for her misfortunes, she meditated the Parvati mantra, on which the child instantly disappeared, and Shiva himself approached her, seated on his bullock cart. He took her up with him, while the clouds rained flowers. The cart then carried them through the sky of Madurai, which astonished the people of the city.

=== 24. Nataraja, the Dancing god, alters his attitude in the Silver Temple at the request of the king ===
After Vicrama-Pandyan had crowned his son, Rajasekara-Pandyan, and had given him his kingdom, there came a learned man from Karikal, the Soren king, and said, "Our king knows the sixty-four Sastras, but you do not know the Baratha-Sastram (art of dancing)." The Pandyan replied, "Having learned the other sixty-three, I consider it indecorous to learn the last text, seeing that Shiva himself condescended to dance in the silver temple." Disliking the reproach, he set about learning the art. However, he found it difficult to learn it, and one day, went to the silver temple where Shiva was standing on one leg, and requested that the god should change the position of his feet by standing on the other leg. The king added that while he struck his sword into the ground, that if this was not done, he would fall on his sword and kill himself. On this kingly request being made, Shiva placed down the lifted leg and raised the other one, thus changing the leg on which he stood, at which the Pandyan was overjoyed. He entreated that this changing of the leg might be made publicly to appear to the people, which request the god condescendingly granted.

=== 25. Shiva relieves an innocent person who is scared of the avenger of blood ===
After Rajasekara-Pandyan had given up the kingdom to his son Kulothunga-Pandyan, the latter married many wives, and had a great many children; among the eldest of which children, was Ananta-guna-Pandyan, who was taught all needful accomplishments. About that time, a Brahmin arrived with his wife from Tiruvatur, left her and sat under a tree, in order to go and fetch water. While he was away, an arrow which had long hung suspended in the tree, in consequence of the latter being shaken by the wind, descended and penetrated the body of the woman, who instantly died. At the same time a hunter came to repose, near at hand, under the shade of another tree. The Brahmin on returning, astonished to find her dead, looked round and discovered the hunter. The man charged him with the crime of murder, and took him along with him, together with the body of his wife to the presence of the king. The hunter, on investigation, maintained his innocence, but by consent of the kings' ministers was put to severe torture, and all people admitted that his countenance was not that of a murderer. The king ordered him to be put in irons, and giving the Brahmin a present, bid him to bury his wife. The king prayed to Shiva that his doubt might be cleared. At night the god appeared to the king and said, "Go along with the Brahmin to a chetty's house, where there is a wedding and doubt will be explained." The king, in disguise, accompanied the Brahmin to the place indicated, and while in the chetty's house, by Shiva's favour, they overheard the conversation of two of Yama's servants (Yamadutas). One said, "Our master has ordered us to kill this bridegroom, for whose death there is no apparent instrumental means." The other said, " Tush, don't you know how by the fall of the arrow from the tree we took the life of the Brahmin woman, and carried it to our master. So now, while the marriage procession returns, I will loose the bullocks from their ropes, and then you, seated on the horns finish the business." The king asked the Brahmin what he thought of this, who said, "If the event correspond, I shall then hold the hunter to be innocent." Soon after, as the marriage procession came, the great noise which was made alarmed the bullocks, one of which broke its rope, and running furiously at the bridegroom, gored him, and caused his death. On this development the king and Brahmin returned. The king, setting the hunter at liberty, apologised for punishing him wrongfully, and giving the Brahmin presents, said, "Go, seek another wife, and submit to unavoidable evils."

=== 26. The removal of a great crime ===
While Kulothunga-Pandyan reigned, there was a Brahmin celebrated for his patience, whose wife was not virtuous, and his son was excessively vicious. The evil thought occurred to him of defiling his father's couch, and his mother, losing all self-restraint, tolerated the atrocity. The Brahmin, conjecturing the state of things, waited in the expectation of a full discovery. The son, knowing such to be the case, cut off his father's head. He then took all the household property and he set off, together with his mother, to settle in another home. While on the way, in a forest, they were attacked by robbers, who took away son's mother and the property, and left him alone in the forest. He became wretched to an extreme degree, both in mind and body, by the judgment from Brahma. One day, when Sundareshvarar and Meenakshi were gone out of the temple, in the guise of hunters, they agreed that the enormity of the crime could only be removed by themselves. As the culprit met them, he was instructed to feed cows with grass and to bathe daily in a certain tank. By following this direction he gradually resumed the appearance and nature of a Brahmin, according to his birth; and finally attained to the highest bliss. The Pandyan hearing of the grace of his deity (Shiva) celebrated his praises; and the tank acquired the title of "Crime removing" to present time.

=== 27. Shiva punishes a guilty person by killing him ===
While Kulothunga-Pandyan ruled, there came a learned man to the place, skilled in science. In consequence of his celebrity, a young man sought permission to become his disciple, and being accepted, became equal to his master. The evil thought entered his mind of killing his aged preceptor and carrying off the latter's wife. While the preceptor was absent, he made some overtures, but was repulsed by the wife, she being a chaste one. In consequence, he determined on violent proceedings, and Shiva, knowing his evil designs, resolved to punish him. Accordingly, assuming the shape of the aged preceptor, he came and challenged the disciple to a fight. The latter joyfully accepted, as promising an easy conquest and success in his designs. Accordingly, both combatants met the next day, fully armed, and a contest began, which lasted for ten days. At length the aged combatant cut out the younger one's tongue, cut out his eyes and his head, and then disappeared. The people cried out, "Where is the aged conqueror?" and ran to his house and were informed by his wife that he had gone to the temple. On finding him there, they asked how he could have passed unseen through their midst. The sage replied, it was not he who had fought, but Sundareshvarar. The king hearing of these circumstances gave valuable presents to the man and his wife. After crowning his son Anantaguna-Pandyan, he went to the presence of Shiva (that is, he died).

=== 28. The destruction of the striped serpent sent by the Chamanals (Jains) ===
While Anantaguna-Pandyan was reigning, the beads, ashes, and other tokens of the Shaiva religion, were everywhere visible, by reason of his patronage. The Chamanals, being moved with envy, made a great sacrifice, out of the fire which an asura, in the form of a striated serpent was sent to devour and destroy the inhabitants of Madurai. On its approach the king besought Shiva, who gave him permission to kill it. As it came to the western gate of the city, the Pandyan dispatched several arrows, which the serpent broke to pieces. However, at length one arrow, shaped in the form of a crescent, penetrated the serpent, which vomited a great deal of poison, by the pestilential effects of which many people of the town died. On this evil occurring, the Pandyan besought the god Shiva to sprinkle a few drops of ambrosial water from his hair on the place, which request being granted, the pestilence disappeared, and the king reigned prosperously over his people.

=== 29. Nandi conquers the cow sent by the Chamanals (Jains) ===
When the Chamanals found that Anantaguna-Pandyan had killed the serpent, they were angry and consulting together said, "If we send a cow, they will be afraid to kill that." Wherefore making a sacrifice, an asura in the shape of a cow came forth, and was instructed to destroy Madurai. There upon it proceeded, raising dust in great rage. The Pandyan heard the occurrence and to besought with Shiva, asking on what he should do. The god, addressing Nandi, his the bullock vehicle, said, "Go and conquer the cow." On which the bullock set out, richly caparisoned. On meeting the asura cow, he assaulted it with his horns, but the cow, becoming bewildered, was changed into a mountain, and Nandi, enlarging its size, also a mountain alongside. But it afterwards, in a slender form, returned to Shiva and was received with applauses, in which Parvati joined. Soon after, Rama came with Sugriva, Hanuman and his forces to these mountains, on his progress towards Lanka. The sage Agastya then came to him and explained to him the legend of these mountains. Rama then went to Madurai and worshipped Shiva. On his return from the conquest of Ravana, bringing his consort Sita with him, he again passed by the city, and after paying honours to Shiva, went back to Ayodhya. He then returned with his consort to Vaikuntha. Meantime, Anantaguna-Pandyan having, by the favour of Shiva, received a son named Kulopushana-Pandyan. He had his son crowned and died.

=== 30. Shiva arrives with a great army, by the account Of Savundra Samuntan, the general of the Pandyan ===
The general, named Savundra Samuntan, was a great devotee of Shiva, and while carefully conducting the affairs of the kingdom, the king of a tribe of hunters, named Sethurayen, threatened the kingdom with an invasion. On which occurrence the Pandyan said to his general, “Take money from the treasury, and raise some more troops." He did so but instead of raising troops presented all the money to Shiva. The general expended it in temple ornaments, feasting the Brahmins and in supporting the followers of Shiva. The man from time to time put off the king with excuses, falsely pretending to write letters to neighbouring countries for aid. After a month, the king became impatient, and said, "Tomorrow all the troops should be here, how is it that I see none have arrived?" Urged by the necessity of the case, the general went and made known the matter to Shiva, who replied, "I will come tomorrow with plenty of troops." The general told the king that aid was at hand, and on the morrow a vast army appeared. The general then said to the king. "Such a division comes from such a country, such a one from another", and so on. The king asked, "Who is that seated on horseback in the midst of all?" The general said, "I do not know." But this was Shiva, mounted on his bullock, it being transformed to the appearance of a horse. The king then placed himself at the head of his own troops and while going forth they were met by a messenger. He brought news that the king of the hunters, having gone to hunt in the forest, had been slain by a tiger. On this intelligence being received, the king gave orders for the different divisions to retire to different places. This order was rapidly obeyed by the army of Shiva's followers that the king greatly wondered, and discovering that it was a sacred amusement of the god, he rendered homage to his general, and lived without anxiety.

=== 31. Shiva gave an exhaustless purse to the Pandyan ===
While the Brahmins were away in other provinces, there was a deficiency of sacrifices, and by consequence no rain. However, the king distributed money liberally among the poor who were sufferers, until there was at length no more money. On which deficiency occurring, the king went and applied to Shiva, but receiving no answer, he became troubled and remained fasting and prostrate all night in the temple. During the night, Shiva appeared in the form of a religious devotee and said, "You have neglected the Brahmins so that they have ceased to offer sacrifices, which is the cause of the unavailability of rain, but for the future you must take care to honour the Brahmins. If you want money, take this purse from which you may draw as much as you please." The Pandyan, on receiving the gift, placed it on his throne and honouring it as the god's donation, drew from it large supplies of money without exhausting the contents. With this money he ornamented the temple, gave large presents to the Brahmins and had sacrifices duly performed. After which there was abundance of rain, distress was removed, and public affairs became prosperous.

=== 32. Shiva sells bracelets to women of the merchant caste ===
The wives of rishis to the amount of eight thousand, were condemned to be born at Madurai, owing to the curse of their husbands for a previous fault, in which Shiva was concerned. He at that time collected a large quantity of bracelets from them, which he now came to sell in the streets of Madurai. All the women crowded to get a pair of the arm-rings, which however immediately fell off again as they had done on a former occasion. Hence this traffic was discovered to be a sacred amusement of the god.

=== 33. Shiva teaches the eight great meditations ===
When Shiva was seated under the shade of a banyan tree, in Kailasa, instructed the rishis about the greatness of the six-headed son of Shiva (Kartikeya) called and implored to be taught the eight forms of prayer. Shiva told them to reverence Parvati, and then they would learn the prayers well. But while he was teaching them they did no pay proper attention, in consequence of which the god, becoming angry, denounced "That they should turned into large stones under banyan trees (ficus religiosa) near Mandura, for a thousand years." On this they fell down before him and besought his mercy. He replied, " After a thousand years I will come to Madurai and restore you to proper shape." Accordingly, they suffered the punishment denounced, and after a thousand years past, the god came in the shape of a religious devotee restored the petrifactions to the human form. Shiva then taught them the eight great meditations, or prayers, after which they prospered.

=== 34. Shiva open the North gate and shows the Temple to the Chera king, closing the gate afterwards with the bullock seal ===
A Chera king, who in consequence of clearing the forest for building the capital of Kanchi (Kanchipuram) obtained the name of Kadu-Vettiya-Cheran. He got it as he was a devotee of Shiva, read the accounts of the sacred amusement and other religious books of the Shiva class. The king felt a great desire to see the temple at Madurai, but not knowing how to accomplish this object (from existing hostility), he pondered a long time over it. At length Shiva, in the form of a religious ascetic, appeared to him in a dream, and bid him to visit Madurai without any fear. On awaking, the king was both astonished and rejoiced. In obedience to the injunction, he set out on horseback, unaccompanied, and after passing hills and forests, came to the north bank of the river Vaigai. The river was then very full and impassable. While halting on the Northern bank, the god appeared in the night, placed the Shaiva mark on the Chera king's forehead and carried him over the river. He then opened the north gate and showed the king every part of the temple. On returning and dismissing the king, the god placed on the gate a seal, having the impression of the bullock (the vehicle of Shiva), and left all carefully closed. In the morning when the guards came, they were astonished to find the seal changed during the night. They then went to the other gates and found that the seals which had been applied were not altered. A report was made to the Pandyan king, which made him arrive to examine the circumstance. The Pandyan king with a view to discover how this wonder had been accomplished, gave himself to fasting and prayer, with prostration on the ground in the temple. Shiva appeared to him in vision and explained to the king that he himself had admitted the Chera king, and sealed the gate with the bullock-seal. The king made this miracle known everywhere, and after living some time happily, he associated with himself his son, named Rajendra-Pandyan, causing him to be crowned. The retired king then obtained a place of note in the Svarga (heaven), that is, he died.

=== 35. Shiva preserves the Pandyan's army by the miraculous appearance of a booth for giving away water ===
The before-mentioned Chera king was allowed to occasionally to visit the temple. The king and the Pandyan king in that time made mutual regulations of peace and good faith. The Chera king planned to give his daughter in marriage to the Pandians, which the younger brother of the latter, named Raji-Mamam, understanding, went to Kanchi and surreptitiously by craft effected that marriage for himself. In consequence, the Chera king conceived an idea of installing his son-in-law on the Pandyan's throne. With this objective, he brought his son-in-law, his own uncle and a large army two yojana (or twenty miles) of Madurai. The Pandyan king, learning the objective of the invasion, went to the temple and said, "This Chera king, your devotee, with whom good faith was plighted, is now coming to dethrone me. What ought I to do?" While he prayed a celestial voice was heard saying, "Go out tomorrow with all your army and I will give you victory." The next morning the king accordingly left the fort, with an army which resembled a continuous river running into the sea. The two armies joined battle, and there was a severe combat under fifteen Indian (or six English) hours. The people of both armies were fainting for thirst, when in the midst of the Pandyan's troops a water-booth became visible, and Shiva within, in the shape of a Brahmin, caused Ganga in his crown of hair to pour forth her streams. The god received it in his hands, and however numerous were the people that came for water they were all instantly supplied. Thus the Pandyan's troops were enabled with renewed strength to carry on a vigorous combat, ending in the capture both of the Chera general and of the king's younger brother. Both of these the Pandyan king carried before the god, and presenting them, asked what was to be done? The reply was, "You are just and merciful, do according to the dictates of your mind." On receiving this oracle, the king gave Cheran the escort of a few troops, and sent him back disgraced to Kanchi. To his own brother, he appropriated some portion of that brothers' former revenues; and afterwards ruled the kingdom, even as a mother governs her family.

=== 36. The performance of alchemy by Shiva ===
In a town on the stream of the Vygai called Puvana-nagar, Shiva, named Puvana-naicker, appeared under a fortunate conjunction of all the planets. A female dancer in the presence of the god named Punanial, who was devoted to Shiva, and had other distinguished qualifications, was very anxious that an image of the god should be made of gold and thought much how to accomplish this wish. She meditated on Shiva, who before had given an exhaustless purse to the Pandyan. One day Shiva appeared to her under the form of a religious ascetic. On making various inquiries he learned what her wishes were as to the image and directed her to bring all the metal vessels which she possessed. On her doing so, he bid her at night to melt them all in the fire, assuring her that gold would come forth. She desired him to attend and direct the process, but he excused himself, saying he was the Siddhar of Madurai. The woman then discovered that this was an amusement of Sundareshvarar. Following his instructions, gold came forth from the melting pots, with which an image was made, that was afterwards consecrated by the Brahmins, and thereby made the residence of the god. The woman lived long, and at last attained superior happiness in another world.

=== 37. On the Chera king making war, both he and the Pandyan fell into the lotus tank, from which the Pandyan was rescued ===
After Raja-purantara-Pandyan had obtained beatification, his son was named Rajesa Pandyan, whose son was Raja-kembira Pandyan; his son was Pandyan vamasadeva Pandyan; his son was Purantara sitten; and his son was Pandya vamasapathagen; concerning whom none were in particular were recorded. The son of the latter was Suntaresvara-Patha Sekara Pandyan, who while reigning manifested great regard for the Shaivas, established an army, built pagoda-towers with choultries and collected jewels for Shiva. At this time the Chera king, who was styled "Commander of a thousand horse," knowing the feebleness of the Pandyan's army, set out on an invasion. The Pandyan was informed of the circumstance and was afterwards promised victory by a celestial voice. The Pandyan set out with his troops, which, though few, by favour of Shiva appeared as though they were a great multitude. The god appeared on a horseback, in the guise of a hunter and advanced with the Vel (a kind of spear) in his hand. He came to Cheran and said, " You are styled commander of a thousand horse, now I am commander of an immense multitude of cavalry. Find me out some equal for combat." On this challenge being given Cheran fled, but Shiva having disappeared, he turned, and losing fear, again advanced on Madurai. The Pandyan in turn became afraid and fled, but as there were numerous tanks filled with the lotus flowers concealing the water to the west of the fort, the Pandyan and his troops fell into them. The Cheran and his troops in pursuit also fell into the tanks. From this situation the Pandyan and his people were delivered by the favour of Shiva, and Cheran with his people perished. The Pandyan then taking the spoils of the vanquished' returned to his city in triumph and prospered for a long time.

=== 38. Shiva gives a stock of paddy to a Vellalan (farmer) ===
There was a Vellalan, named Nallan, whose wife was very devout, and often insisted much on the property and reasonableness of feeding the followers of Shiva. But the couple were in considerable straits and difficulties even for their own support. After suffering hunger for some days, the man said, “We shall never have sufficient for our own livelihood and preservation, unless we feed the servants of the god.” At his suggestion both himself and wife went to the temple, where, with affection, they performed the usual ceremonies; and among other things ventured to say, "It is better that we should be released from the burden of this body than remain thus." On which prayer being offered, a celestial voice was heard, saying, " I have placed in your cottage a heap of rice, which you will find to be inexhaustible. Take from it what is necessary to your own support, and give what you please to my servants." They accordingly returned home, and seeing the rice continued very bountifully to feed the Brahmins, the temple servants, and other needy people, using as much as they required for themselves. They thus lived on earth long and happily; and afterwards joined the pure beings in the world of Shiva.

== Adaptations ==
- The 1956 Tamil film Naan Petra Selvam includes a play within a film based on the story where the poet Nakkeerar confronts Shiva over an error in his poem, exaggerating his sensitivity to right and wrong.
- The 1965 film Thiruvilaiyadal depicts four stories from the source material, including the Nakkeerar episode.
- A 64-episode TV series also titled Thiruvilaiyadal, created by Radhika Sarathkumar, premiered in 2008 and adapted all 64 stories of the Puranam.

== Bibliography ==
- Guy, Randor (1997). Starlight, Starbright: The Early Tamil Cinema. Amra Publishers. OCLC 1129588233.
- Thiagarajan, K. (1965). Meenakshi Temple, Madurai. Meenakshi Sundareswarar Temple Renovation Committee.
