= Palam Marg =

Palam Marg is essentially a stretch of the Outer Ring Road of New Delhi which serves as the access point to the affluent neighbourhood of Vasant Vihar in South West Delhi. On one side of the road, there are twenty five houses which are a mixture of embassies and high profile residences.
These, separated from the main road by a service road, are considered to be among the best addresses in Delhi and since the plots of land are large, come at a premium. On the other side of the road are a mixture of parks and the famous Malai Mandir. Well known past and present residents include Ajay Bijli, the owner of PVR Cinemas, Aroon Purie Media tycoon, Deepak Kothari, owner of Kothari Products known for Pan Parag.

1, Palam Marg was for many years the Chilean Embassy in India. It was a special house of much grandeur, designed by the Austrian architect K.M. Heinz. The former Chilean ambassador wrote an extended piece on the history and significance of this house and described it as The House of Spirits.

13, Palam Marg was the first house to be made on the street. It belongs to the Jain family.

== Embassies ==
Diplomatic missions on the road include:
Embassy of Spain
Embassy of Portugal
Bahrain High Commission
Embassy of Oman
Embassy of Kazakhstan
Embassy of Nigeria
Embassy of Panama
Embassy of Saudi Arabia
Malaysia High Commission
British High Commission branch
Colombian Embassy
Kenya High Commission
Embassy Of Tunisia
