= Kanchanamalai =

Mother of Hindu goddess Meenakshi

- Queen (Maharani) of Madurai and Korkai; Maharani; Raja Mata

Queen consort of Madurai & Korkai and Empress of Pandyan dynasty
- Reign: 1200 BCE
- Born: Chola Nadu
- Spouse: Malayadhvaja Pandya
- Issue: Meenakshi
- Dynasty: Suryavamsha (by birth); Pandyan Dynasty (by marriage)
- Father: Surashena

Kanchanamalai (Tamil:காஞ்சனமலை) was legendary queen consort of Madurai and Korkai and also empress of the Pandya dynasty. She ruled Madurai alongside her husband, King Malayadhvaja Pandya. She was also the mother of Meenakshi. Kanchanamalai is believed to be the reincarnation of Vidyavati (a princess of Gandharva kingdom).

== Life ==
Nothing is mentioned or known about Kanchanamalai outside of this legend written during the Meenakshi era. Kanchanamalai was born to king Surashena of the Solar dynasty. She was a pious devotee of the goddess Parvati. When Kanchanamalai was living her old birth as Vidyavati, she requested that Parvati be born as her daughter in her next birth. While performing a yajna with her husband, she was granted a child called Meenakshi who was a reincarnation of goddess Parvati.

== Widowhood ==
After the death of her husband king Malayadhvaja Pandya, she lost her role as queen consort and later assumed the role as Raja Mata (widow of former king) and also witnessed the coronation of her daughter Meenakshi as she became the ruler and queen regnant of Madurai and prime empress of Pandya clan. She also witnessed the wedding of Meenakshi and Sundareśvarar. After the wedding of her daughter it is believed that she spent her last days of life in her chamber.

== Temple and legacy ==
A temple in Madurai, Arulmigu Kanchanamalai Amman Tirukovil, was built and dedicated to Kanchanamalai. She is seen as a goddess by few devotees because she was the mother of Meenakshi.

== Sources ==
- Mookerji, Radha Kumud (1988) [first published in 1966], Queen Kanchanamalai. The unspoken queen (4th ed.), Motilal Banarsidass, ISBN 81-208-0433-3
