= Kallalagar Temple =

Perumal temple in Madurai district, Tamil Nadu, India

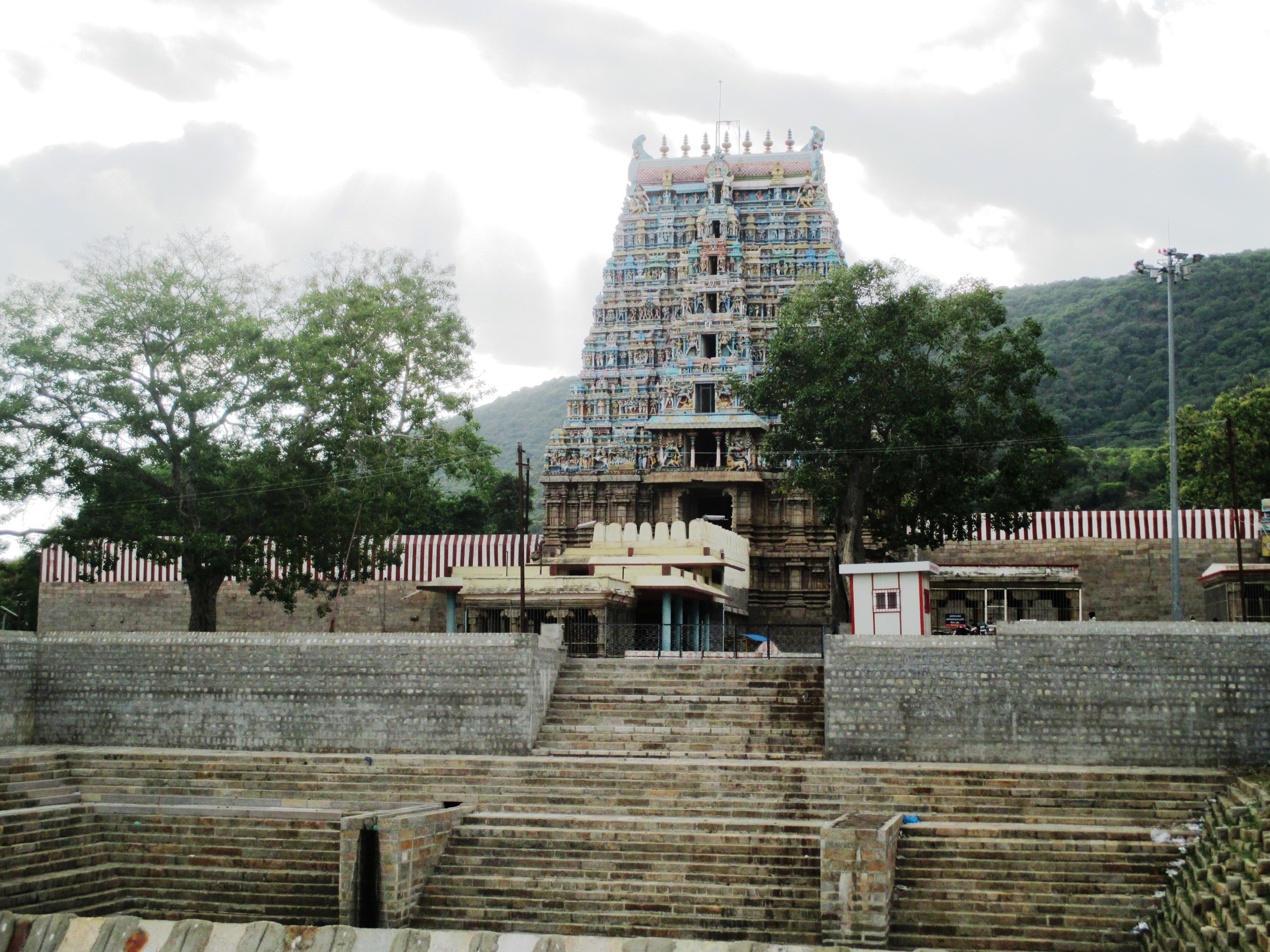

- Location in Madurai

Religion
- Affiliation: Hinduism
- District: Madurai
- Deity: Kallalagar (Sundararaja Perumal) (Vishnu); Kalyana (Sundaravalli Thayar) (Lakshmi)
- Festivals: Float festival; Chitirai Thiruvila; Navaratri; Vaikunta Ekadashi
- Features: Tower: Somachandra Vimanam

Location
- Location: Alagar Kovil, Madurai
- State: Tamil Nadu
- Country: India
- Coordinates: 10.074136°N 78.214356°E

Architecture
- Type: Tamil architecture

Website
- https://alagarkoilkallalagar.hrce.tn.gov.in

Kallalagar Temple or Kallazhagar Temple, also known by its own toponym Thirumaliruncholai, is a Hindu temple dedicated to the Hindu protector god Vishnu in Alagar Koyil, a village in Madurai district in the South Indian state of Tamil Nadu. Constructed in the Tamil Style of Architecture, the temple is glorified in the Naalayira Divya Prabandham, the early medieval Tamil canon of the Azhvar saints from the 6th–9th centuries CE. It is one of the 108 Divya Desams dedicated to Vishnu, who is worshiped as Kallalagar, and his consort Lakshmi as Thirumagal. This temple is called as Thirumaliruncholai in Sangam literatures and Naalayira Divya Prabandham sung by Tamil Alvar saints.

A granite wall surrounds the temple, enclosing all its shrines. The temple has a seven-tiered rajagopuram. The temple is surrounded by a large fort, part of which is dilapidated. The temple is also the shrine for the Tamil village deity Karuppuswami, who is worshipped as 18 granite steps behind a closed door. The door is only opened annually once during the Aadi month (July–August).

Vishnu is believed to have appeared as Kallalagar to redeem sage Suthapava of his curse from Sage Durvasa. The temple follows the Tenkalai tradition of worship. Six daily rituals and many yearly festivals are held at the temple, of which the float festival during the Tamil month of Masi (February–March), Navrathri during September–October and Vaikunta Ekadashi during Margazhi (December–January) being the most prominent. The temple is maintained and administered by the Hindu Religious and Charitable Endowments Department of the Government of Tamil Nadu.

== Legend ==
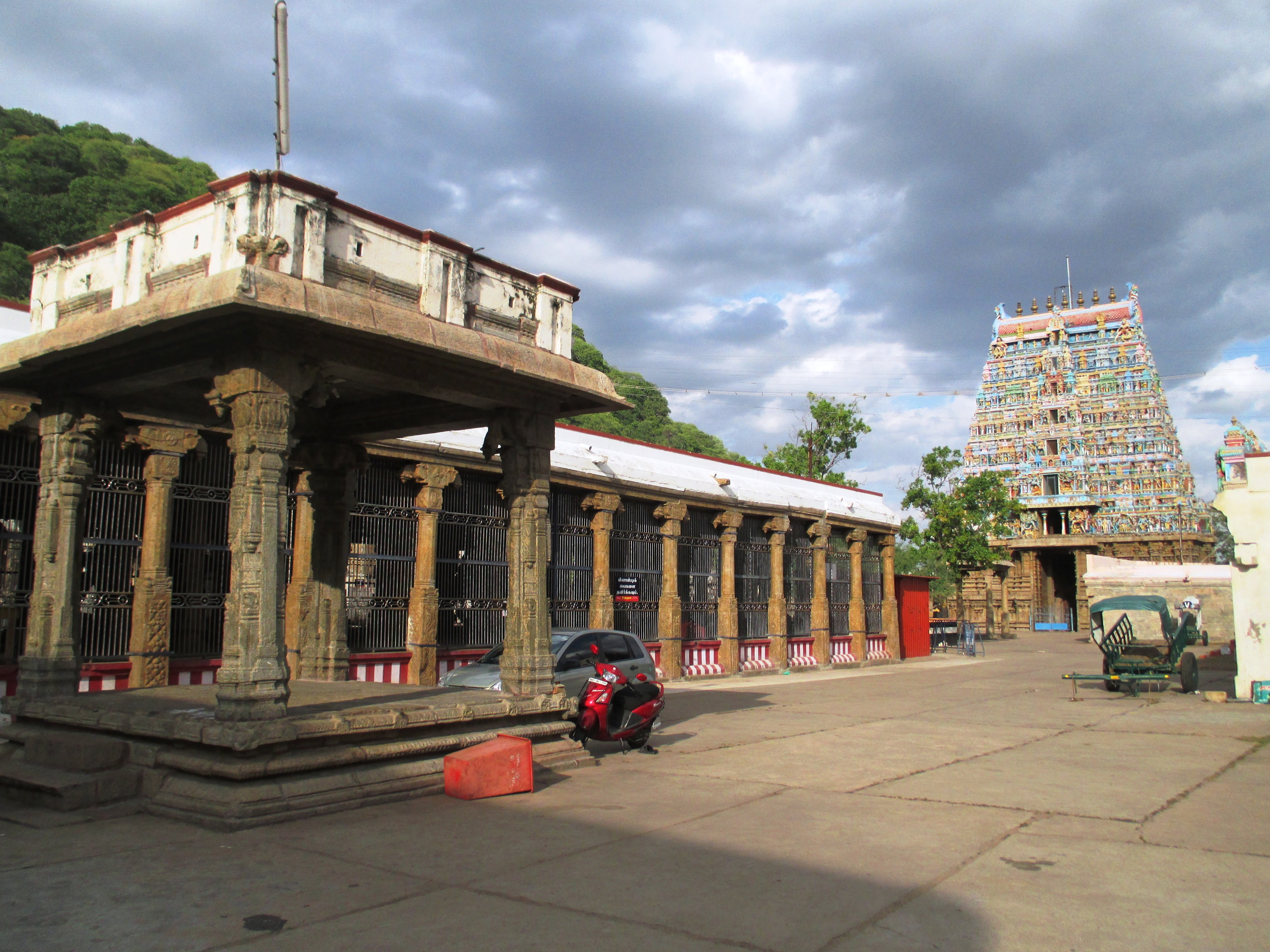
The gateway towers of the temple

As per Hindu legend, Sage Suthapava was taking bath in the Nupura Ganga water spring at Alagar Hill and did not pay heed to sage Durvasa, who was passing by. The enraged Durvasa cursed Suthapava that he would turn into a frog until he is redeemed of his curse by Vishnu, who is also known as Kallalagar. Suthapava, who is nicknamed as ‘Manduka Maharishi’ because of his frog form, performed prayers and penance on the banks of river Vaigai, at Thenur. Vishnu descended from his abode in the Alagar Hill to redeem Manduka Maharishi off his curse. Since days unknown, it is believed that Kallalagar comes to Thenur via Malaipatti, Alanganallur and Vayalur. In Thenur Mandap, the god redeems the sage of his curse and leaves for his abode. During the rule of king Thirumalai Nayak (1623 to 1659 CE), in 1653 the Manduka Maharishi relieving ritual was shifted to Vandiyur village where the event is performed at Thennur Mandapam, built by Thirumalai Nayak himself.

As per another Hindu legend, the presiding deity was worshiped by Yama, the god of death. He requested Vishnu to stay in the place and built a temple with the help of Vishvakarma, the divine architect.

== Architecture ==
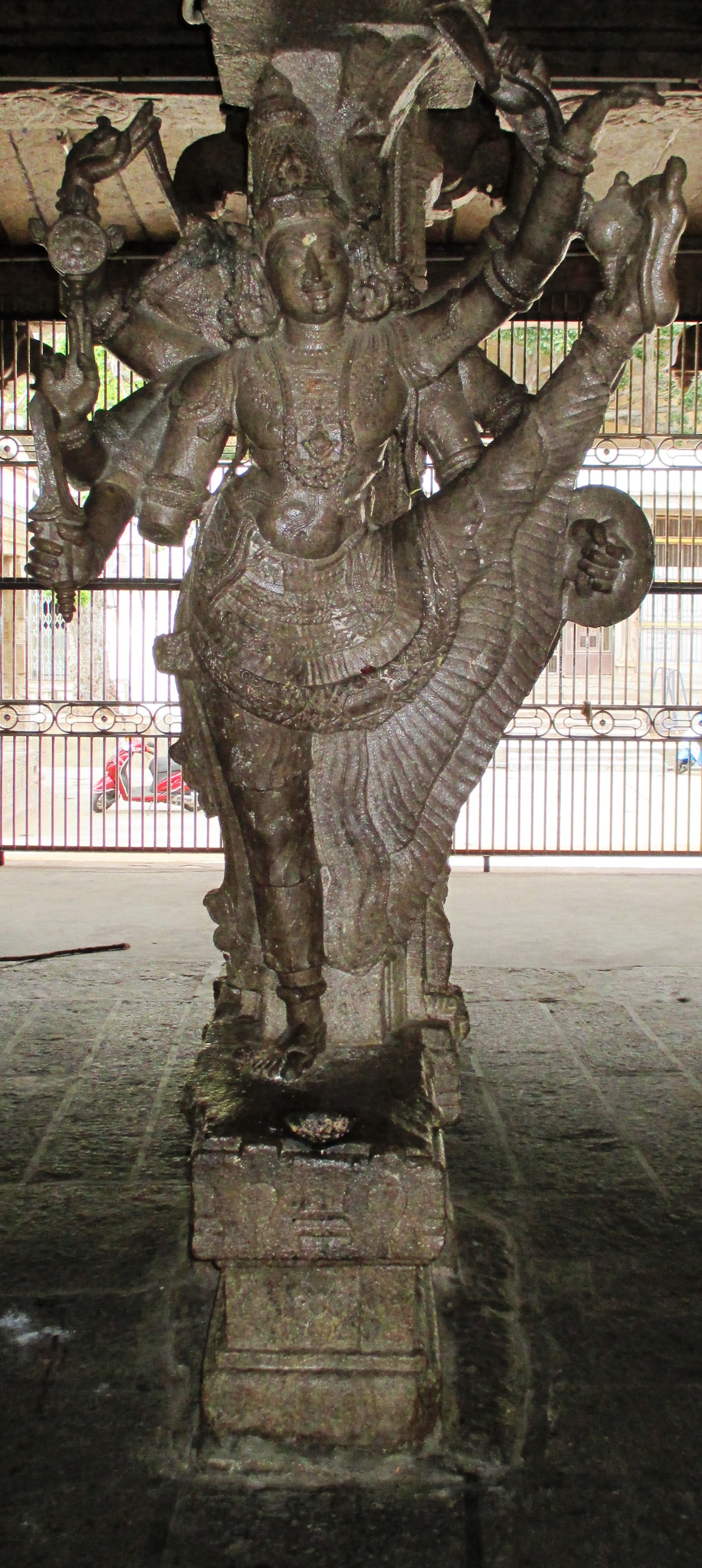
Ulagalantha Perumal, Vishnu's Vamana avatar

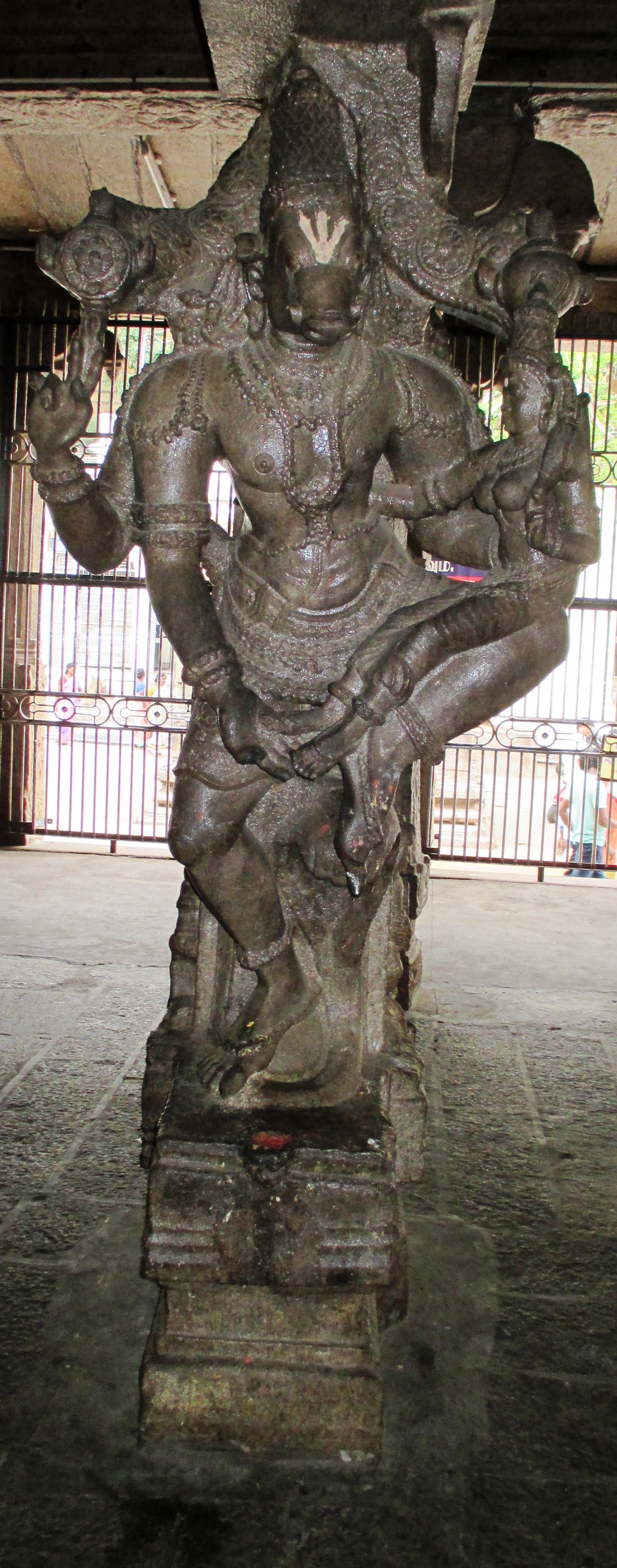
Varaha Avatar, the boar form of Vishnu

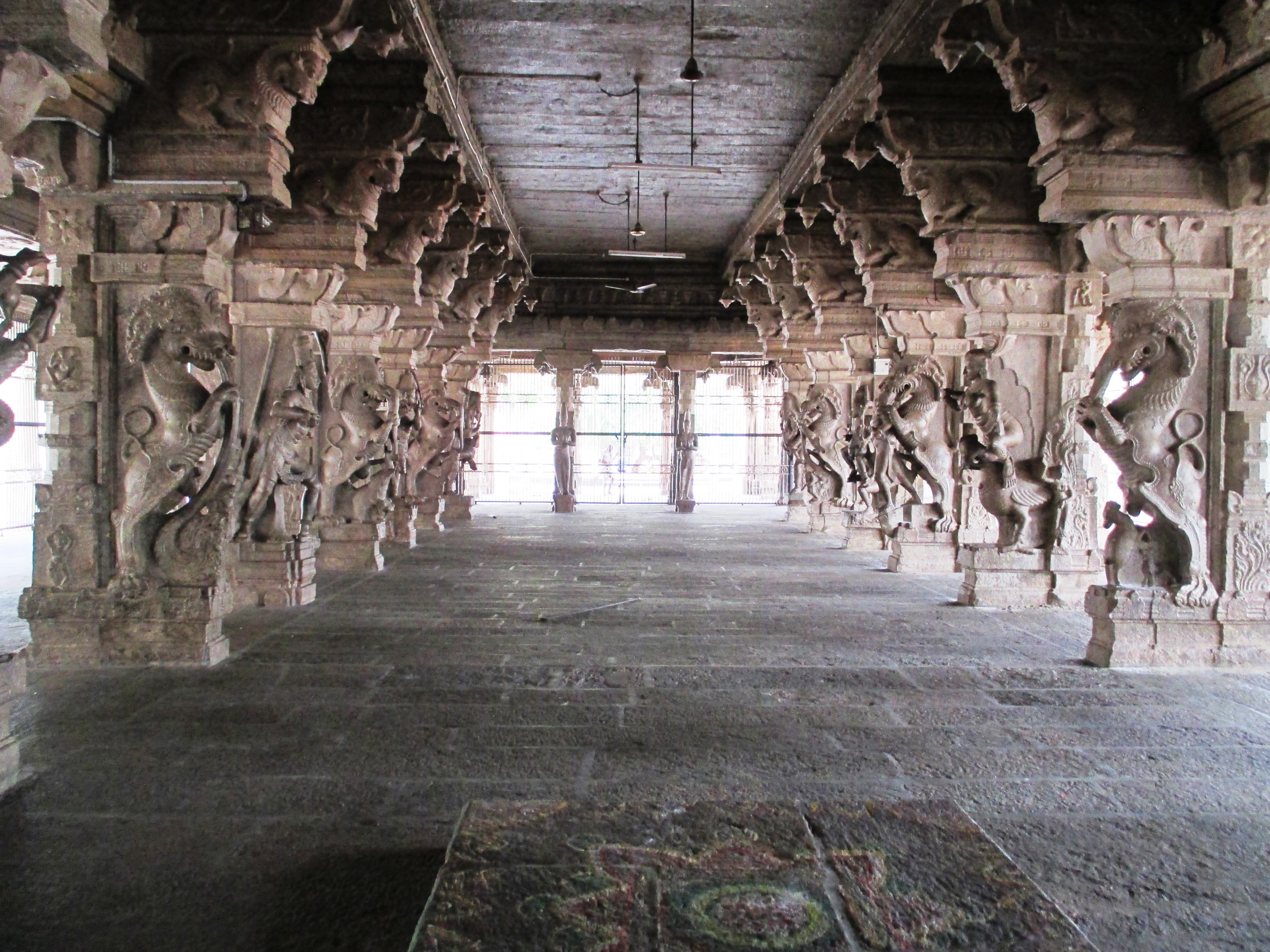
Pillared halls of Kalyana Mandapam, where rare Vijayanagara period images are housed in the sculpted pillars

Kallalagar temple covers an area of about 2 acres (0.81 hectares) and has a seven-tiered gopuram (gateway tower). The temple in enclosed in a rectangular enclosure with huge granite walls. The central shrine houses the image of the presiding deity in standing posture. The images of Sridevi and Bhudevi are also housed in the sanctum. There two life size images of Narasimha, the avatar of Vishnu. One of them is shown holding the demon Hiranya and other slaying him. There are separate shrines of Sundaravalli Nachiyar, Andal, Sudarshana and Yoga Narasimha around the shrines of the sanctum.

The temple houses some rare Vijayanagara sculptures similar to the ones present in Soundararajaperumal Temple, Thadikombu, Krishnapuram Venkatachalapathy temple, Srivilliputhur Divya Desam and Jalakandeswarar Temple, Vellore.

The architecture of the Alagar temple corresponds to any of those of south Indian temples, with large gopurams and pillared mandapams. The gopuram of the Karuppuswamy shrine depicts the passionate side of human relationship in the form of beautiful statues. Apart from these, it also depicts the evolution of cultural aspects of the local society including a depiction of an Englishman in British police uniforms.

The main tower entrance (Raja Gopuram) always remains closed, with the shrine of KaruppuSwami. The steps behind the closed door is worshipped as Padhinettaam Padi Karuppan (meaning, the black village deity who occupies the eighteen steps). The door is always closed, and covered in sandalwood paste. There are various legends associated with it. Only once a year, the doors are opened and Sudarshana Chakra (Chakrathalvar), the celestial discus, passes over through the open door. This is a centuries-old practice, where even the festive deity of the presiding deity is not allowed to pass through the doors.

The famous Vaishnava works in Tamil, belonging to the early 4th to 6th centuries point that to this temple as a Vishnu temple. The Sangam age Cilappatikaram belonging to 3rd century CE, points out to this temple as a Vishnu temple. During 2013, while cleaning the area in front of Karuppuswami shrine, a big Teppakulam was discovered, filled with sand and covered with dense undergrowth.

== Religious significance ==
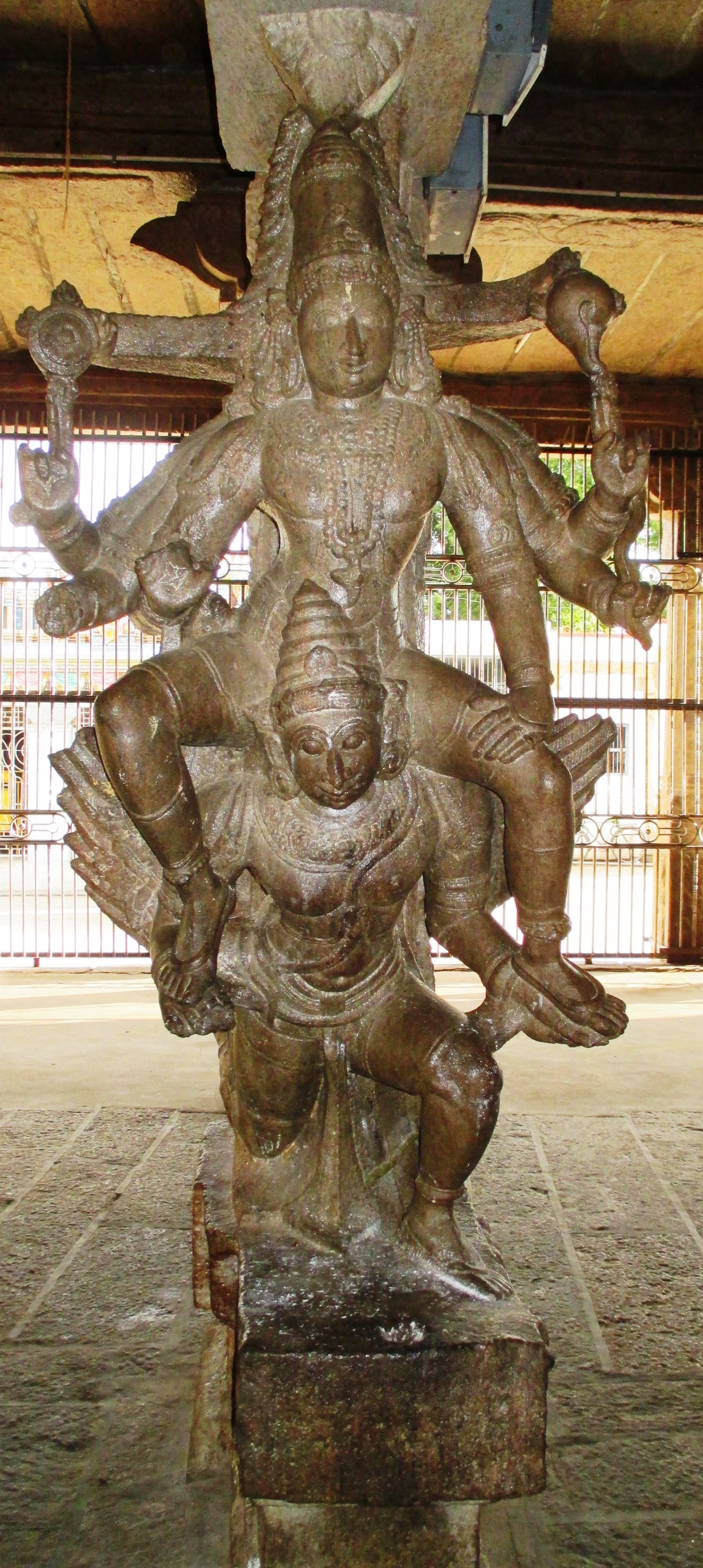
Garuda, vahana of Vishnu carrying him

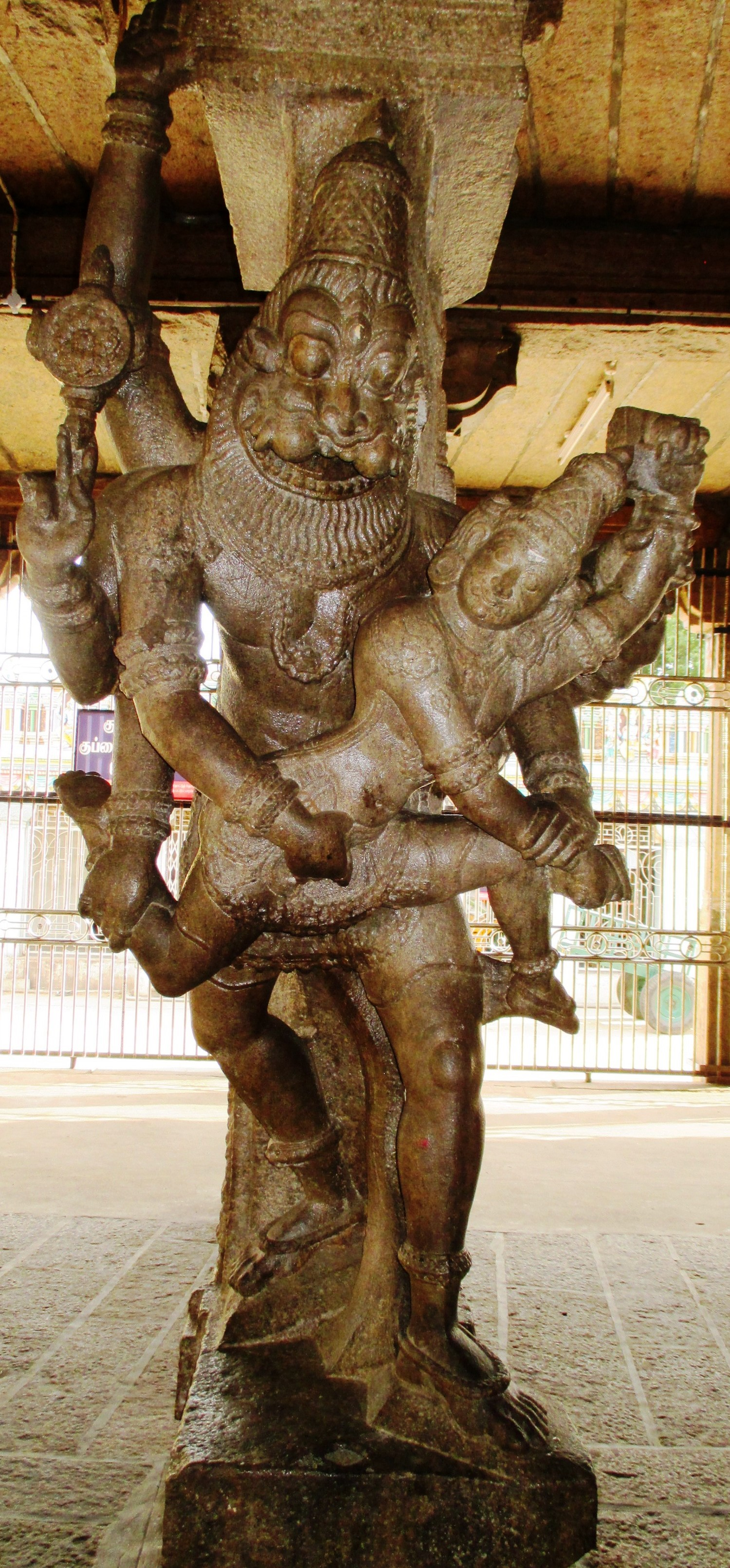
Narasimha, an avatar of Vishnu slaying Hiranyakashupu

Kallalagar temple is revered in Naalayira Divya Prabhandam, the 7th–9th century Vaishnava canon, by Periyalvar and Peyalvar. The temple is classified as a Divyadesam, one of the 108 Vishnu temples that are mentioned in the book. During the 18th and 19th centuries, the temple finds mention in several works like 108 Tirupathi Anthathi by Divya Kavi Pillai Perumal Aiyangar. There are many waterbodies associated with the temple like Pandava, Hanuman, Uttara Narayana, Garuda. The ablution to the presiding deity is performed with waters from these tanks. The water from other sources, if used, is believed to turn the image to black colour.

== Religious practises and festival ==
The temple follows the traditions of the Tenkalai sect of Vaishnavite tradition and follows Vaikanasa aagama. In modern times, the temple priests perform the pooja (rituals) during festivals and on a daily basis. As at other Vishnu temples of Tamil Nadu, the priests belong to the Vaishnavaite community, a Brahmin sub-caste. Six daily rituals are held at various times of the day and many yearly festivals are held at the temple, of which the float festival during the Tamil month of Masi (February–March), Navaratri during September–October and Vaikunta Ekadasi during Margali (December–January) being the most prominent. There are weekly, monthly and fortnightly rituals performed in the temple. Abhishekam, ablution of the presiding deity, is performed only with the waters from Noopura Ganga, a lake on the top of the hill. Water from other sources is not used as it is believed to decolour the image.

Every year during the Tamil month of Chithirai (April–May), Chithirai Thiruvila is celebrated. Chithirai Thiruvila is a yearly event of the marriage of Meenakshi, believed to be Alagar's sister. The first 15 days of the event is celebrated in Madurai for the arrangements between Meenakshi and Sundareswarar, while the next 15 days is about Alagar making preparations for her marriage. The main event is Kallalagar crossing the Vaigai river. Ethir Sevai is a part of the Chithirai Thiruvizha of the Kallazhagar temple at Alagar Koyil and begins on the fourth day. On this day, Alagar or Vishnu changes his appearance as Kallar and travels via Kallar Nadu and enters Madurai and the city’s residents welcome him. Millions of people gather in Madurai to witness this event. While Kallalagar enters the river, he learns that his sister's marriage is already over, he returns to Karuparayar Mandapam and then he takes ten avatars and finally returns to Alagar Kovil. This temple obtained a new car, after 300 years, built with a team of 15 artisans using vengai tree wood for the structure and Burma teakwood for sculptures. The trial run was held on 6 July 2015. The temple is one of the major tourist attraction in the region.
