= Palam Village =

- Village
- Location within India
- Coordinates: 28.5611674°N 77.1217546°E
- Country: India
- State: Delhi

Palam is a historical village near Palam in Delhi, India.
