= Palam Rajauri =

Palam village in Rajuari district

Palma
- Palam

Area
  - Total: 487.2 ha (1,204 acres)

Population
  - Total: 2,900 (2,011 CENSUS)
- Time zone: +5:30
- Postal code: 185131

Palam (also spelled Palma) is a small village located about 6 to 8 kilometres from Rajouri town in the Rajouri district of Jammu and Kashmir, India.

The village lies on the lower slopes of the Pir Panjal range, with the eastern side bordered by the foothills of the Pir Panjal mountains and the remaining sides surrounded by smaller hill ranges of the Rajouri area. Nearby villages include Khenchi Mod, Budhi Mod, Nagrota, Chokian Mehra, Kotdhara and Sankari.

== Tourist Attractions ==
1. Palma Park (near PHC Palam)
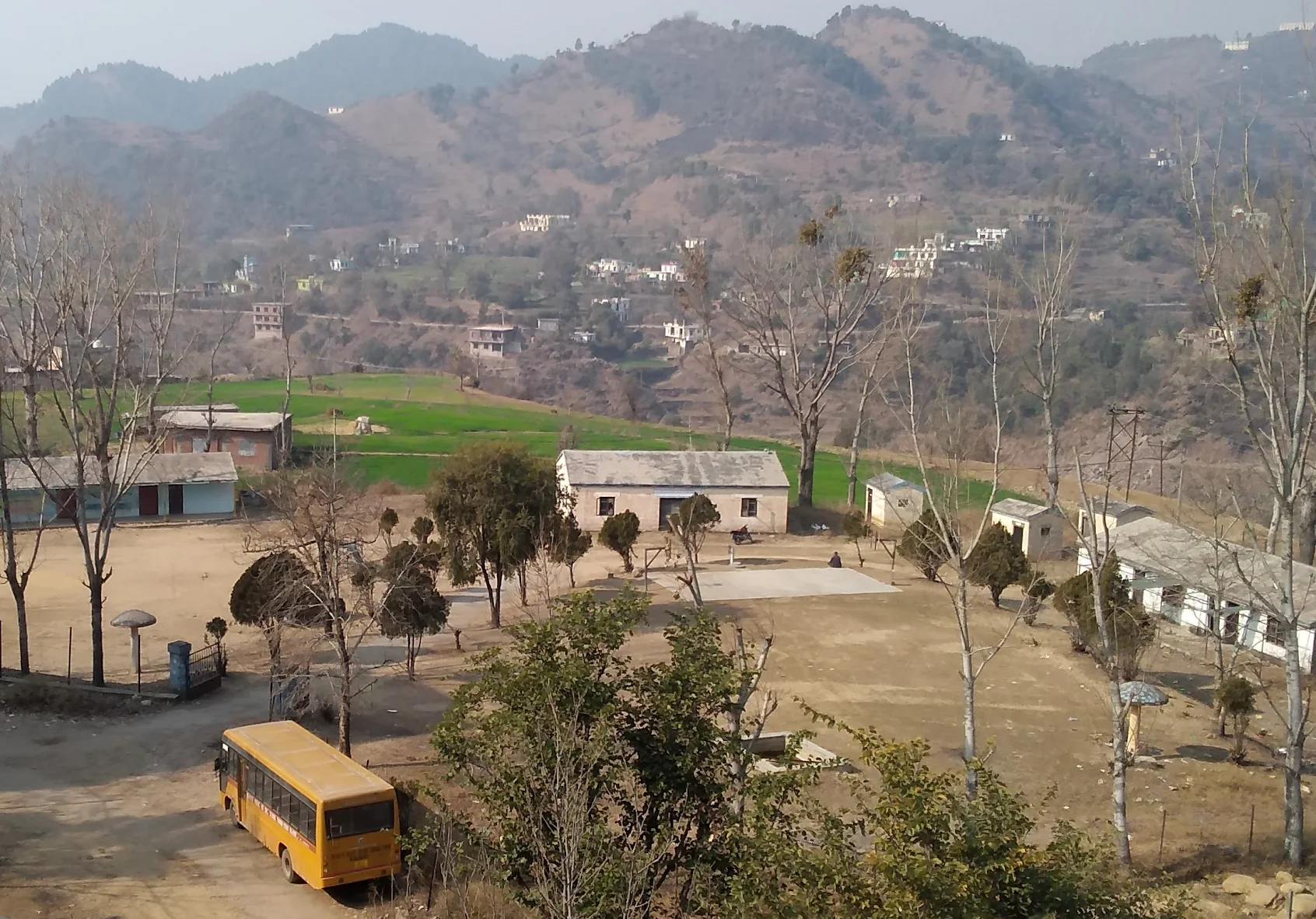
  Palma Park (near PHC Palam)
  One of the two local recreation areas in Palam is located near the Primary Health Centre. The park covers a good amount of open space and includes a few small buildings used for community purposes. The Panchayat Secretary office is also situated inside the park. It sits directly behind Government High School Palam, which makes it a common place for students and local residents. People often play cricket, volleyball and other outdoor games here, and it serves as a general gathering spot for the village.
2. Palma Park (Forest) The park is located near the Forest Check post in Palam, close to the Rajouri–Kotranka stretch of National Highway 144A. It is surrounded by dense trees, and visitors usually walk a short distance from the roadside to reach the main open area of the park. The space includes basic play equipment such as swings and slides and is used by local children and families.
3. Rhim Jhim Palam Rhim Jhim is a small government-managed recreational spot in Palam village, located along the Samote–Lohran Road near the village’s main approach. The area includes a modest green space with seating and is commonly used by residents as a rest stop. There is also a small eatery inside the park area, which makes it a local stop for visitors travelling through the Rajouri–Kotranka stretch of NH 144A. The park functions as a simple public space rather than a formal tourist site, but it is well known within the village and nearby areas.

== 2011 census details ==
The local language is Urdu. The total population is 2919 and the number of houses are 477. The female population is 36.0%. The village literacy rate is 67.4% and the female literacy rate is 17.2%.

== Population ==
Census Parameter	Census Data
Total Population	2919
Total No of Houses	477
Female Population %	36.0 % ( 1050)
Total Literacy rate %	67.4 % ( 1967)
Female Literacy rate	17.2 % ( 503)
Scheduled Tribes Population %	33.6 % ( 982)
Scheduled Caste Population %	3.9 % ( 114)
Working Population %	50.1 %
Child(0 -6) Population by 2011	397
Girl Child(0 -6) Population % by 2011	45.8 % ( 182)
