= Meenakshi =

Hindu goddess, a form of Parvati

- Tutelary deity of Madurai
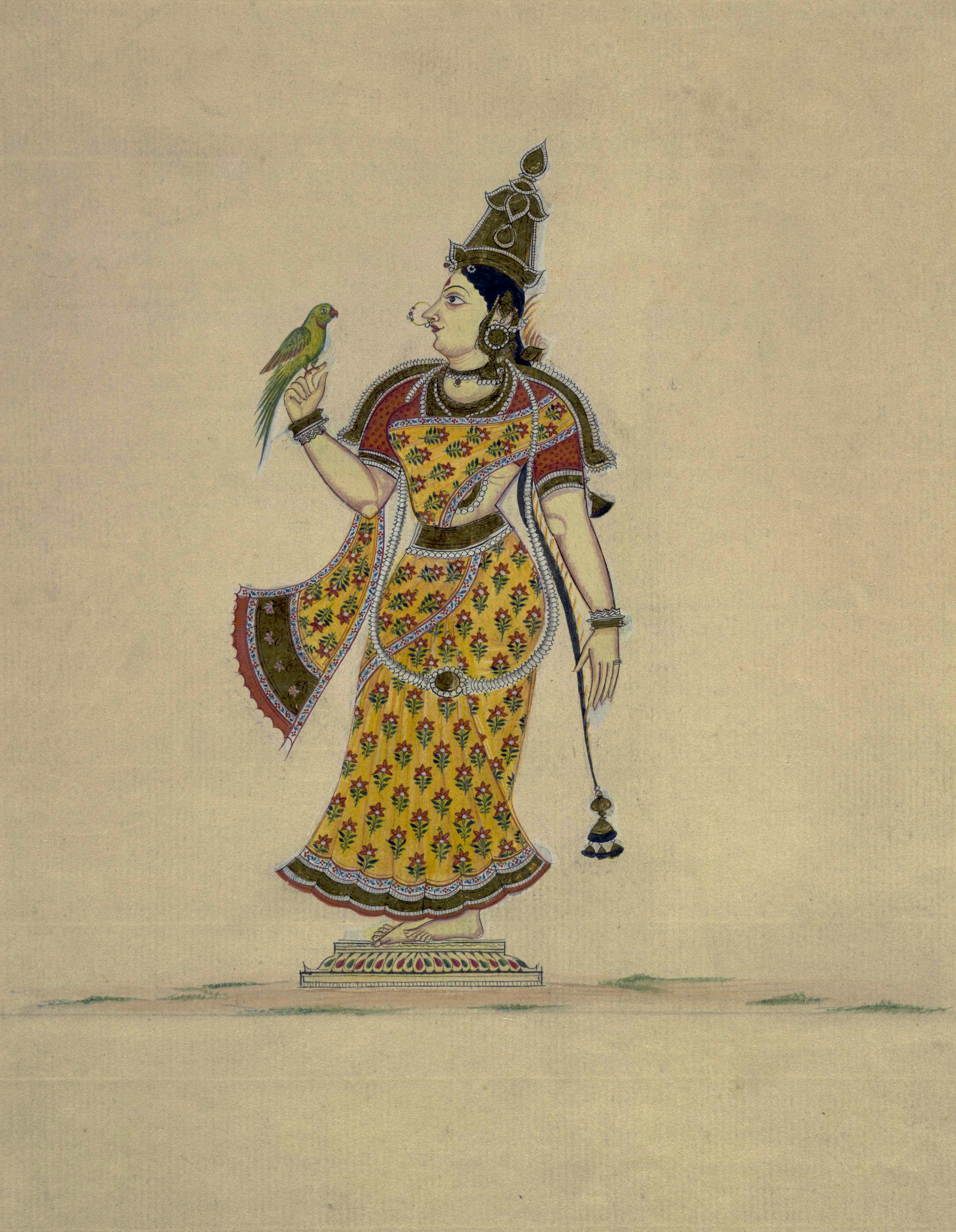
- Meenakshi
- Other names: Aṅgayaṟkaṇṇi, Taḍādakai, Mīnāṭci, Mantriṇi, Mangayakarasi, Maduraidevi
- Affiliation: Parvati, Devi
- Abode: Madurai
- Animals: Rose-ringed parakeet

Genealogy
- Parents: Malayadhvaja Pandya (father); Kanchanamalai (mother)
- Siblings: Aḻagar (Vishnu)
- Consort: Sundareswarar (Shiva)
- Dynasty: Pandya dynasty

Meenakshi (also spelt as Minakshi or Mīnāṭci, and also known as Aṅgayaṟkaṇṇi, and Taḍādakai) is a Hindu goddess. She is considered as a form of the goddess Parvati, and is the tutelary deity of Madurai. Along with Kamakshi (Kanchipuram), and Visalakshi (Varanasi), she is considered as one of the three avatars of Adi Shakti. She is represented as the divine consort of Sundaresvarar, a form of Shiva, and the sister of Alagar, a form of Vishnu.

Meenakshi finds mention in Tamil literature as the warrior queen of the ancient Pandya kingdom, and was later deified. She is mainly worshipped in South India, and has a major temple devoted to her in Madurai. She is usually portrayed with a raised right hand holding a lotus, on which sits a green parrot, while her left hand hangs by her side. Meenakshi Tirukalyanam, the marriage of Meenakshi and Shiva is celebrated as a major festival. She was also extolled as Shri Vidya by Adi Shankara.

== Etymology ==
Mīnākṣī is a Sanskrit term meaning 'fish-eyed', derived from the words mīna 'fish' and akṣī 'eye'. She was mentioned in early Tamil literature as Taḍādakai meaning 'fish-eyed one' in Tamil. She is also known by the Tamil name Aṅgayaṟkaṇṇi or Aṅgayaṟkaṇṇammai (lit. 'the mother with the beautiful fish eyes'). The name of might also mean "rule of the fish", derived from the Tamil words meen ('fish') and aatchi ('rule'), denoting the fish signage on the flag used by the Pandyas.

Various meanings of this appellation have been suggested, including that she was originally a goddess of the fisher-folk, that her eyes are "large and brilliant" like that of a fish, or that she has "long and slender" eyes shaped like the body of a fish. Another interpretation is that the name is based on the belief that the fish never close their eyes: the goddess similarly never stops watching over her devotees. Yet another interpretation states that the name is based on the ancient belief that the fish feed their young by merely looking at them; the goddess supposedly supports her devotees by merely glancing at them.

== Texts ==
Meenakshi Pancharatnam (five jewels of Meenakshi) is an incantation to Meenakshi composed by Adi Shankara (8th century CE). Though Meenakshi does not directly appear in the Lalita Sahasranama, there is a reference to her in the line Vaktralakṣmī parīvāha calan mīnābha ocanā (She who has the face of Lakshmi and has fish-like eyes in the river of her face). Several hymns to the goddess were composed in the early modern period by many saints and scholars such as Neelakanta Dikshitar. Tamil literature portrays Meenakshi as the intersection of domesticity and divinity.

== Legend ==
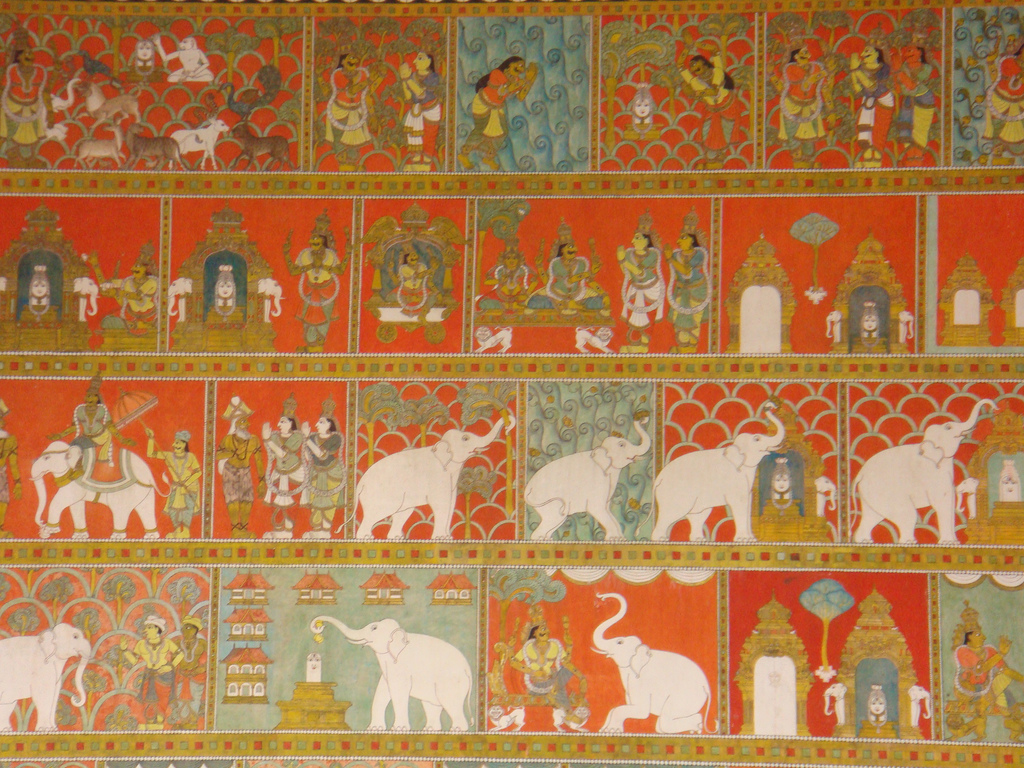
Painting on the wall of the Meenakshi Temple depicting the legend of Meenakshi

According to the 16th century Tamil text of Thiruvilaiyadal Puranam, King Malayadhwaja Pandya and his wife Kanchanamalai performed a yajna seeking a son to succeed the king. A daughter appeared out of the fire, who was three years old and had three breasts. When the parents prayed to lord Shiva, a divine voice advised them to bring up the child, and that she will lose the third breast when she meets her future husband. The girl grew up in the palace, and the king crowned her as his successor. When she finally met Shiva, who took the form of Sundareswarar, she took her true form of Meenakshi, an incarnation of Parvati. Meenakshi Tirukalyanam, the marriage of Meenakshi and Shiva was a grand event, with the attendance of various Hindu gods, and other celestial and living beings.

According to religious scholar William P. Harman, the story may reflect the matrilineal traditions prevalent in South India during the time and the regional beliefs that "[spiritual] powers rest with the women", gods listen to their spouse, and that the fates of kingdoms rest with the women. According to historian Susan Bayly, the reverence for Meenakshi is a part of the Hindu goddess tradition that integrates with the Hindu society where the "woman is the lynchpin of the system" of social relationships. According to anthropologist Christopher Fuller, the wedding represents a symbolic paradigm for human marriages during the time.

== Meenakshi Temple ==
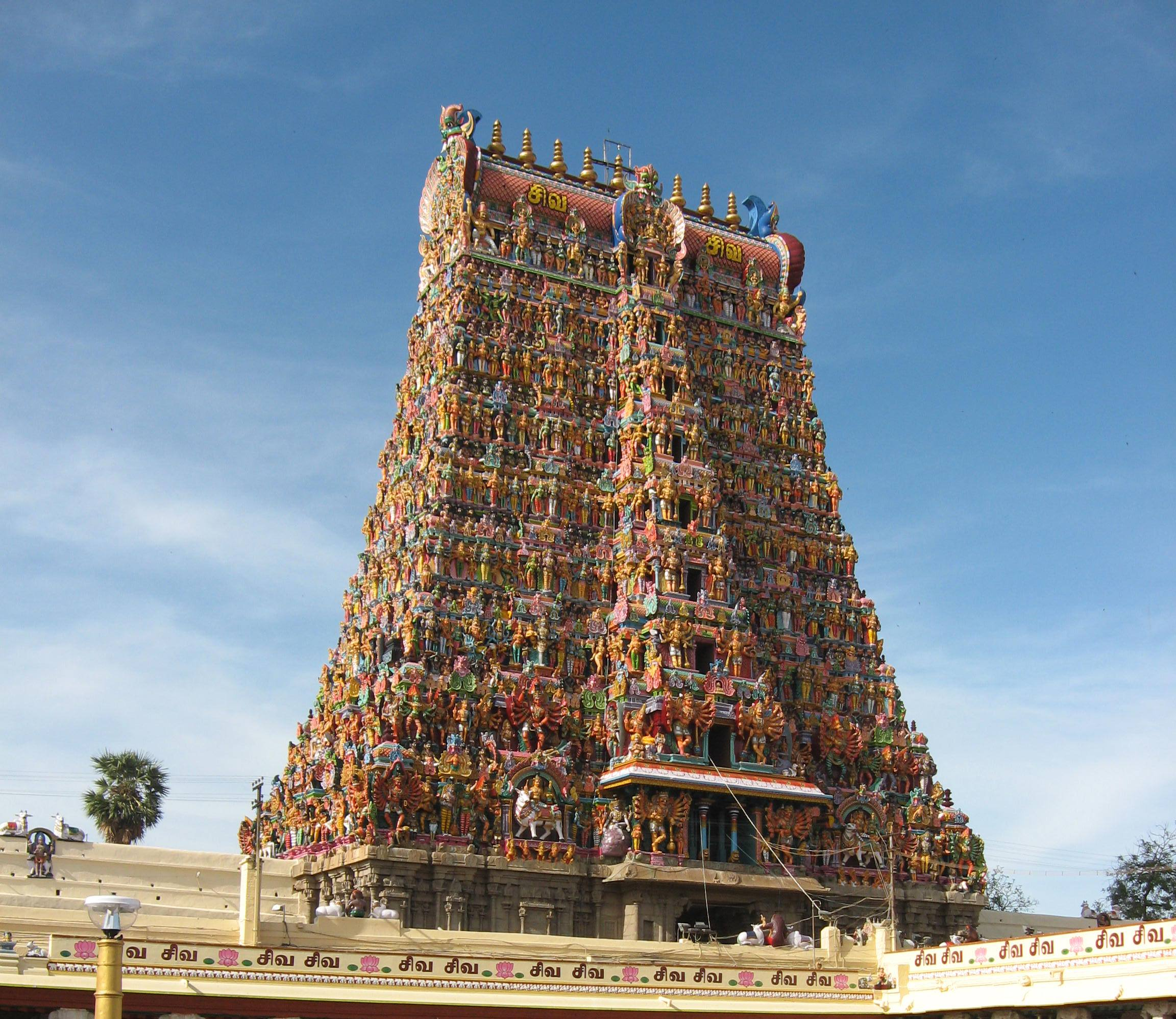
A Gopuram of the Meenakshi Temple at Madurai

The Meenakshi Temple in Madurai is dedicated to Meenakshi, who is worshipped as the primary deity in the temple. Also referred to as Meenakshi Amman or Meenakshi-Sundareswarar Temple, The shrines of Meenakshi and her consort Sundareswarar are located next to each other in the inner courtyard.

Though the temple was mentioned in texts from 6th century, it was built extensively during the rule of the Pandyas in the 11th to 12th century. After most of the temple was destroyed in the early 14th century by the armies of Delhi Sultanate, the temple was rebuilt after during the Vijayanagara rule in the late 14th to 15th centuries. Most of the present masonry was rebuilt after the 14th century, and the temple was furtherrenovated and expanded in the 16th and 17th centuries by the Madurai Nayaks.

The main shrines are located in the center of the temple complex, surrounded by various monuments inside concentric prakarams (enclosures). The enclosures are fortified with high masonry walls, with the outer walls having four towering gopurams (gateways), one each on either direction, which allow people to enter the complex from all four directions. The complex has numerous sculpted pillared mandapa including the Ayirakkal mandapam (thousand pillar hall). There are various shrines are dedicated to Hindu deities inside the temple complex. The vimanas above the garbhagrihas (sanctums) of Meenakshi and Sundareśvarar are gilded with gold.

The temple is a major pilgrimage destination within the Shaivism tradition, dedicated to Meenakshi and Shiva. As Vishnu is considered to be Meenakshi's brother, it is mentioned as Mathura of the South in the Vaishnava texts. The large temple complex is the most prominent landmark in Madurai and attracts tens of thousands visitors a day. The temple attracts over a million pilgrims and visitors during the annual 10-day Chithirai festival, celebrated with much festivities and a ratha (chariot) procession during the Tamil month of Chittirai.
