= Alcohol prohibition in Tamil Nadu =

Alcohol prohibition in Tamil Nadu is governed by the State Prohibition and Excise department as per the Tamil Nadu Prohibition Act, 1937. TASMAC, a state government-owned company, controls the wholesale and retail vending of alcoholic beverages in the State. On 24 May 2016, after her swearing-in, J. Jayalalithaa announced the closing of 500 liquor shops and the reduction of the business hours of State-run liquor shops across the State. On 20 February 2017, the first office order signed by the Chief Minister Edappadi K. Palaniswami was the closure of 500 liquor outlets owned by the public sector TASMAC. This is in addition to the 500 liquor outlets closed down by late Chief Minister J Jayalalithaa in May 2016.

== Prohibition before Independence ==
The Madras Abkari Act of 1886 set in place a strict regulation that banned the local manufacturing of alcohol and confined it to central distilleries where excise duty was paid prior to being sold. This British tax policy favored the consumption of foreign liquors over more traditional drinks such as toddy and country liquors. One fifth of the Madras Presidency population consumed alcohol. Excise revenue from Madras Presidency accounted for as much as 38% of its total revenue. As per Historian Robert Eric Colvard, alcohol consumption came to be defined as something "foreign" and inherently anti-Indian by nationalists. Major Indian freedom struggle like the Swadeshi, Non-Cooperation, and Civil Disobedience movement played vital role in anti-alcohol agitation. When Congress won with majority in Madras Presidency in 1937, C. Rajagopalachari imposed alcohol prohibition in Salem district then later extended throughout the presidency.

== Prohibition after Independence ==
Though prohibition was relaxed on other states after independence including former Madras Presidency regions, Tamil Nadu continued to adopt total prohibition until 1971. In 1971 the DMK government led by M. Karunanidhi suspended it in 1971 and allowed the sale of arrack and toddy. But later, the same government stopped the sale of these in 1974. In 1981, the AIADMK government headed by M.G. Ramachandran lifted prohibition and reintroduced the sale of arrack and toddy. Due to wide use of the methanol in industries and there were no restrictions in other States, In 1984 September methanol was removed from the purview of the Tamil Nadu Prohibition Act. In 1987, the sale of arrack and toddy was again banned. During 1975-76 and 1988–90, illicit liquor claimed many lives in Tamil Nadu. In 1990, the DMK government revived the sale of arrack and toddy. In 1991 July 16, again the sale of arrack and toddy was banned by new government led by J. Jayalalitha. Methanol was substituted and consumed under the illegal liquor trade. In 2002, Methanol brought again under Prohibition act

== TASMAC ==
Whenever the state government has imposed prohibition, the illegal sale of toddy and arrack along with consumption of methanol, an industrial solvent, has resulted in the loss of several lives. This paved the way for a lifting of the ban. In 2001, prohibition was lifted once again and TASMAC became the wholesale monopoly for alcohol. In January 2002, the Tamil Nadu government under O. Panneerselvam started selling low-cost liquor through TASMAC. In 2014-15, the annual revenue of TASMAC was Rs. 26,188 crores and the company sold 48.23 lakh cases of liquor.

== Anti-liquor agitations ==
59-year-old Gandhian Sasi Perumal protested to demand closure of a TASMAC shop in Kanyakumari. During the protest on 31 July 2015, Perumal climbed up a mobile phone tower and began losing his consciousness led to death. In August 2015, residents of Kalingapatty village in Tirunelveli district, was led by Mariammal, mother of Vaiko ransacked nearby TASMAC outlet to call for prohibition in the state. On 30 October 2015, police arrested Kovan, a Folk artist and a member of extreme Left group Makkal Kalai Iyakkam, who was criticising government policy on earning revenue by selling liquor.

Nandhini, then a law student, lead anti-alcohol protests across Tamil Nadu in the 2010s.

== Related Acts and Rules ==
1. Tamil Nadu Prohibition Act, 1937
2. The Tamil Nadu Neera and Padaneer Rules, 1939
3. The Tamil Nadu Molasses Control and Regulation Rules, 1958.
4. The Tamil Nadu Denatured Spirit, Methyl alcohol and Varnish (French Polish) Rules, 1959
5. The Tamil Nadu Spirituous Essence Rules, 1972
6. The Tamil Nadu Disposal of Articles (Confiscated under Tamil Nadu Prohibition Act, 1937) Rules, 1979
7. The Tamil Nadu Distillery Rules, 1981
8. The Tamil Nadu Indian Made Foreign Spirit (Manufacture) Rules, 1981
9. The Tamil Nadu Liquor (Licence and Permit) Rules, 1981
10. The Tamil Nadu Liquor Transit Rules, 1982
11. The Tamil Nadu Indian Made Foreign Spirit (Supply by Wholesale) Rules, 1983
12. The Tamil Nadu Brewery Rules, 1983
13. The Tamil Nadu Prohibition Appeal and Revision Rules, 1983
14. The Tamil Nadu Mass Wine Rules, 1984
15. The Tamil Nadu Chloral Hydrate Rules, 1984
16. The Tamil Nadu Spirituous Preparation (Control) Rules, 1987
17. The Tamil Nadu Rectified Spirit Rules, 2000
