= Death of Sasi Perumal =

Sasi Perumal (Tamil: சசி பெருமாள்) (c. 1955 – 31 July 2015) was a Gandhian activist and anti-liquor activist from Salem, Tamil Nadu. He protested for the enforcement of prohibition in Tamil Nadu for over four decades. He died near Marthandam in Kanyakumari after staging a demonstration atop a BSNL tower for the removal of a TASMAC outlet near a church at Unnamalaikkadai.

== Protests ==
Sasi Perumal started his anti-liquor crusade after prohibition was lifted in Tamil Nadu in 1971. He ran awareness meetings, first in his village and in the surrounding areas. Later, he shifted his base to the city of Salem. He was often spotted near the statues of Mahatma Gandhi and K. Kamaraj, wearing a Gandhi cap and holding the India national flag, exhorting people not to drink alcohol.

He had staged many protests with his National Peoples Federation, including a 33-day hunger strike in 2013, and a long fast in 2014 at Jantar Mantar in New Delhi, demanding nationwide prohibition.

== Death ==
Sasi Perumal died on 31 July 2015 while climbing down from mobile tower after staging a protest. He was accidentally pierced by a rod which led to a fall. He had been protesting for the shifting of a TASMAC outlet in Unnamalaikadai, a panchayat town in Kanyakumari district.

His death sparked a series of violent protests in Tamil Nadu. On 3 August 2015, MDMK general secretary Vaiko was charged with rioting after a demonstration in his native village, Kalingapatty. On 5 August, a 40-year-old TASMAC employee was killed when a kerosene bottle was thrown in his shop. With State Assembly elections due in 2016, many political parties including the DMK have pronounced themselves in favour of prohibition.

== Private life ==
Sasi Perumal was born S. K. Perumal in a farming family. He changed his name to Sasi in memory of Tamil actor Sasikumar who died in 1974. He had two sons from a first marriage and a daughter with his second wife Makilam Ammal.
