= Sivakasi Lok Sabha constituency =

Former constituency of the Indian parliament in Tamil Nadu, India

Coordinates: 9.5°N 77.8°E

Sivakasi
- Former Lok Sabha constituency

Constituency details
- Country: India
- Region: South India
- State: Tamil Nadu
- Established: 1967
- Abolished: 2008
- Reservation: None

Sivakasi was a Lok Sabha constituency in India which existed until the 2004 Lok sabha elections. It was converted into Virudhunagar constituency after delimitation in 2008.

== Assembly segments ==
Sivakasi Lok Sabha constituency was composed of the following assembly segments:

1. Sattur (moved to Virudhunagar constituency)
2. Virudhunagar (moved to Virudhunagar constituency)
3. Sivakasi (moved to Virudhunagar constituency)
4. Rajapalayam (moved to Tenkasi constituency)
5. Srivilliputhur (moved to Tenkasi constituency)
6. Kovilpatti (moved to Thoothukudi constituency)

== Members of Parliament ==
| Year | Name | Party |
|---|---|---|
| 1967 | P. Ramamoorthy | Swatantra Party |
| 1971 | V. Jeyalakshmi | Indian National Congress |
| 1977 | V. Jeyalakshmi | Indian National Congress |
| 1980 | N. Soundararajan | All India Anna Dravida Munnetra Kazhagam |
| 1984 | N. Soundararajan | All India Anna Dravida Munnetra Kazhagam |
| 1989 | K. Kalimuthu | All India Anna Dravida Munnetra Kazhagam |
| 1991 | R. Kanga Govindarajulu | All India Anna Dravida Munnetra Kazhagam |
| 1996 | V. Alagirisamy | Communist Party of India |
| 1998 | Vaiko | Marumalarchi Dravida Munnetra Kazhagam |
| 1999 | Vaiko | Marumalarchi Dravida Munnetra Kazhagam |
| 2004 | A. Ravichandran | Marumalarchi Dravida Munnetra Kazhagam |

== Election results ==
Vote share of Winning candidates
| 2004 | 56.44% |
| 1999 | 41.2% |
| 1998 | 49.6% |
| 1996 | 29.5% |
| 1991 | 53.4% |
| 1989 | 57.5% |
| 1984 | 51.6% |
| 1980 | 45.3% |
| 1977 | 53.3% |
| 1971 | 56.7% |
| 1967 | 45.8% |

=== 2004 ===
2004 Indian general elections: Sivakasi
| Party | Candidate | Votes | % | ±% |
|---|---|---|---|---|
| MDMK | A. Ravichandran | 469,072 | 56.44 | +15.23 |
| AIADMK | Kannan. P | 304,555 | 36.64 | +4.89 |
| JD(U) | Dheepa Valentina | 27,130 | 3.26 | n/a |
| Independent | Venkatesan. K | 10,156 | 1.22 | n/a |
| Majority | | 164,517 | 19.79 | +10.34 |
| Turnout | | 831,167 | 63.27 | +0.41 |
| MDMK hold | | Swing | +15.23 | |

=== General Election 1999 ===
| Party | Candidate | Votes | % |
|---|---|---|---|
| MDMK | Vaiko | 325,829 | 41.2% |
| AIADMK | V.Ramasamy | 251,048 | 31.7% |
| TMC(M) | A.Gunasekharan | 152,817 | 19.3% |
| IND | R.Thamaraikani | 36,977 | 4.7% |
| IND | A.Somasundaram | 4,660 | 0.6% |
| AIFB | A.C.Cheenasamy thevar | 4,330 | 0.5% |
| IND | V.Seenivasagan | 944 | 0.1% |
| IND | K.Subbukalai | 669 | 0.1% |
| IND | PID.Thiyagarajan alias Yogakannan | 500 | 0.1% |
| IND | P.Sahadevan | 454 | 0.1% |
| IND | I.Ramasamy | 378 | 0.0% |
| IND | V.Kannan | 234 | 0.0% |
| IND | K.Ganesan | 224 | 0.0% |
| IND | N.Gunasekharan | 163 | 0.0% |
| IND | M.Manmathan | 154 | 0.0% |
| IND | K.Muthupandian | 83 | 0.0% |
| Majority | | 74,781 | 9.5% |
| Turnout | | 790,751 | 62.9% |
| MDMK Hold | | | |

=== General Election 1998 ===
| Party | Candidate | Votes | % |
|---|---|---|---|
| MDMK | Vaiko | 387,694 | 49.6% |
| CPI | V.Alagirisamy | 252,771 | 32.3% |
| PT | S.Sathiyamoorthy | 106,726 | 13.7% |
| INC | K.Rajendran | 9,745 | 1.2% |
| IND | K.Mariappan | 1,922 | 0.2% |
| IND | C.Ponnusamy | 1,756 | 0.2% |
| IND | M.Manmathan | 1,021 | 0.1% |
| IND | Thiyagarajan alias Yogakannan | 793 | 0.1% |
| IND | M.Gurusamy | 639 | 0.1% |
| RJD | A.Rajasekhar | 627 | 0.1% |
| IND | S.V.Rengyananam | 583 | 0.1% |
| IND | V.Kannan | 369 | 0.0% |
| IND | R.P.Ramasamy | 271 | 0.0% |
| Majority | | 134,923 | 17.3% |
| Turnout | | 781,757 | 65.0% |
| MDMK gain from CPI | | | |

=== General Election 1996 ===
| Party | Candidate | Votes | % |
|---|---|---|---|
| CPI | V.Alagirisamy | 238,483 | 29.5% |
| AIADMK | Sanjay Ramasamy | 214,861 | 26.6% |
| MDMK | Vaiko | 204,339 | 25.3% |
| IND | S.Sathiyamoorthy | 39,427 | 4.9% |
| BJP | S.Mohan Rajalu | 18,941 | 2.3% |
| IND | R.Boosaperumal | 8,947 | 1.1% |
| PMK | P.Lakshmanan | 6,255 | 0.8% |
| Majority | | 23,622 | 2.9% |
| Turnout | | 808,460 | 69.3% |
| CPI gain from AIADMK | | | |

=== General Election 1991 ===
| Party | Candidate | Votes | % |
|---|---|---|---|
| AIADMK | R.Govidarajalu | 365,155 | 53.4% |
| CPI | A.Srinivasan | 202,065 | 29.6% |
| IND | R.Thamaraikani | 50,258 | 7.4% |
| IND | K.Muthu pillai | 18,217 | 2.7% |
| PMK | K.Ponnaiah | 11,208 | 1.6% |
| Jharkhand party | E.Chandran | 3,323 | 0.5% |
| IND | S.Ramachandran | 1,372 | 0.2% |
| IND | M.P.Jeyapal | 1,340 | 0.2% |
| IND | M.Manmathan | 1,271 | 0.2% |
| Tharasu makkal mandram | I.Kannan | 1,146 | 0.2% |
| Majority | | 163,090 | 23.9% |
| Turnout | | 683,293 | 63.5% |
| AIADMK Hold | | | |

=== General Election 1989 ===
| Party | Candidate | Votes | % |
|---|---|---|---|
| AIADMK | K.Kalimuthu | 450,376 | 57.5% |
| DMK | Vaiko | 313,308 | 40.0% |
| PMK | J.S.Balaiah | 1,918 | 0.2% |
| JP | E.Chandran | 1,346 | 0.2% |
| IND | S.Pannerselvam | 920 | 0.1% |
| IND | S.Kanagavel | 651 | 0.1% |
| IND | M.Manmathan | 594 | 0.1% |
| Tharasu makkal mandram | P.Pasupon | 580 | 0.1% |
| IND | C.Pandi | 522 | 0.1% |
| IND | D.Periyasamy | 433 | 0.1% |
| Majority | | 137,068 | 17.5% |
| Turnout | | 783,252 | 72.3% |
| AIADMK Hold | | | |

=== General Election 1984 ===
| Party | Candidate | Votes | % |
|---|---|---|---|
| AIADMK | N.Soundararajan | 323,786 | 51.6% |
| CPI | A.Sreenivasan | 257,308 | 41.0% |
| IND | K.Kaliappan | 12,498 | 2.0% |
| IND | K.Ramar | 4,921 | 0.8% |
| INC(J) | P.Subba Reddyiar | 4,521 | 0.7% |
| Majority | | 66,478 | 10.6% |
| Turnout | | 627,315 | 74.9% |
| AIADMK Hold | | | |

=== General Election 1980 ===
| Party | Candidate | Votes | % |
|---|---|---|---|
| AIADMK | N.Soundararajan | 234,654 | 45.3% |
| INC | V.Jayalakshmi | 228,042 | 44.1% |
| IND | R.M.Sreeram | 21,157 | 4.1% |
| IND | S.P.Raju | 12,422 | 2.4% |
| IND | G.A.Appan | 2,455 | 0.5% |
| IND | S.P.Shenbagamoorthy | 2,402 | 0.5% |
| INC(U) | R.Sooriyanarayanan | 1,856 | 0.4% |
| Majority | | 6,612 | 1.3% |
| Turnout | | 517,475 | 68.4% |
| AIADMK gain from INC | | | |

=== General Election 1977 ===
| Party | Candidate | Votes | % |
|---|---|---|---|
| INC | V.Jayalakshmi | 271,568 | 53.3% |
| NCO | G.Ramanujan | 156,720 | 30.8% |
| IND | S.P.Raju | 41,707 | 8.2% |
| IND | P.Muthu Ramanuja devar | 10,551 | 2.1% |
| IND | A.K.Kandasamy Pandian | 6,457 | 1.3% |
| IND | K.Kaliappanadar | 4,713 | 0.9% |
| IND | R.Subba Reddiar | 3,459 | 0.7% |
| IND | P.Selvaraj | 2,840 | 0.6% |
| Majority | | 114,848 | 22.5% |
| Turnout | | 509,445 | 70.5% |
| INC gain from DMK | | | |

=== General Election 1971 ===
| Party | Candidate | Votes | % |
|---|---|---|---|
| DMK | V.Jayalakshmi | 235,491 | 56.7% |
| SWA | R.Gopalakrishnan | 149,829 | 36.0% |
| IND | S.P.Muthuramanuja Thevar | 5,233 | 1.3% |
| IND | P.S.Reddy | 4,126 | 1.0% |
| Majority | | 85,662 | 20.6% |
| Turnout | | 394,679 | 68.8% |
| DMK gain from SWA | | | |

=== General Election 1967 ===
| Party | Candidate | Votes | % |
|---|---|---|---|
| SWA | P.Ramamoorthy | 194,364 | 45.8% |
| INC | P.A.Nadar | 162,692 | 38.4% |
| CPI | S.Alagarsamy | 55,753 | 13.2% |
| Majority | | 31,672 | 7.5% |
| Turnout | | 412,809 | 78.6% |
| SWA Win (New Seat) | | | |

== See also ==
- Sivakasi
- List of constituencies of the Lok Sabha
