= R. Thamaraikani =

Indian politician

- Born: 19 October 1946; Tamil Nadu, India
- Died: 15 September 2005 (aged 58)
- Occupations: Tamil Nadu MLA, five times, 1977–1980, 1980–1984, 1984–1989, 1991–1996, 1996–2001
- Spouse: R. Devaki
- Children: Four sons and one daughter
- Parent(s): S. Ramasami and R. Shanmugathai

Ramasamy Thamaraikani (19 October 1946 – 15 September 2005) was an Indian politician from Tamil Nadu and a Member of Legislative Assembly. He was elected to Tamil Nadu state assembly five times from Srivilliputhur constituency, three times as an Anna Dravida Munnetra Kazhagam (ADMK) candidate under M. G. Ramachandran, once as an independent and once as an ADMK candidate under Jayalalitha. He has been referred to as maverick and irrepressible by media.

== Personal life ==
Thamaraikani was born on 19 October 1946 to S. Ramasamy and R. Shanmugathai. He was married to R. Devaki and had four sons and one daughter. He died in a private hospital in Madurai on 15 September 2005 at age 59.

== Political career ==
=== ADMK under M. G. Ramachandran ===
Thamaraikani was a staunch supporter of M. G. Ramachandran (MGR) since his school days. He became a member of the Tamil Nadu Legislative Assembly after winning a seat in the 1977 election as a candidate of the ADMK in Srivilliputhur constituency. He won the seat again in 1980 and 1984. After the death of Ramachandran, he contested the 1989 election unsuccessfully as a supporter of the Janaki faction. However, he won the 1991 election as an independent candidate.

=== ADMK under Jayalalitha ===
Thamaraikani joined ADMK under Jayalalitha and won the 1996 assembly election as an ADMK candidate. He became a leader of the ADMK in the assembly for a brief period. He was also the chairman of Srivilliputhur municipality between 1996 and 2000. He was expelled from ADMK by Jayalalitha for alleged anti-party activities. He lost the Lok Sabha election contesting as an independent against ADMK candidate V. Ramaswami, former judge of Supreme Court. He was later re-admitted to the ADMK in November 1999 after expressing regret for his anti-party activities.

=== DMK ===
He joined Dravida Munnetra Kazhagam (DMK) in June 2001 claiming that the leaders of the Ramachandran generation had gone. During his time in DMK party, he lost the 2001 assembly election to his son, Inbatamizhan, fielded by ADMK.

== Electoral Career ==
=== Tamil Nadu Legislative Assembly Elections Contested ===
Elections	Constituency	Party	Result	Vote percentage	Opposition Candidate	Opposition Party	Opposition vote percentage
1977 Tamil Nadu Legislative Assembly election	Srivilliputhur	AIADMK	Won	31.91	M. Gunasekaran	INC	23.30
1980 Tamil Nadu Legislative Assembly election	Srivilliputhur	AIADMK	Won	52.36	P. Karruppiah Thevar	INC	32.63
1984 Tamil Nadu Legislative Assembly election	Srivilliputhur	AIADMK	Won	53.35	P. Senivasan	DMK	45.31
1989 Tamil Nadu Legislative Assembly election	Srivilliputhur	AIADMK(J)	Lost	27.22	A. Thangam	DMK	38.65
1991 Tamil Nadu Legislative Assembly election	Srivilliputhur	Independent	Won	34.28	R. Vinayagamoorthi	AIADMK	33.25
1996 Tamil Nadu Legislative Assembly election	Srivilliputhur	AIADMK	Won	38.50	T. Ramasamy	CPI	31.75
2001 Tamil Nadu Legislative Assembly election	Srivilliputhur	Independent	Lost	13.16	R. T. Inbathamilan	AIADMK	43.88

== Assembly attack ==
During a debate in Tamil Nadu assembly on 23 March 1999, Thamaraikani attacked the then Agriculture Ministers Veerapandi S. Arumugam. The debate was about the law and order situation started by Thamaraikani's partyman. Following the incident, he was subsequently swept to the ground by other DMK members. He was later taken into police custody and suspended along with ADMK MLA C. Karuppasami for the rest of the budget session by speaker P. T. R. Palanivel Rajan.
