= T. Ramasamy =

T. Ramasamy could refer to:

- T. Ramasamy (CPI politician)
- T. Ramasamy (AIADMK politician)
