= Vaiyapuri (surname) =

Vaiyapuri is a surname. Notable people with the surname include:

- Vaiyapuri (born 1968), Indian actor
- Durai Vaiyapuri (born 1972), Indian businessman
- S. Vaiyapuri Pillai (1891–1956), Indian lawyer
