= Srivilliputhur Assembly constituency =

One of the 234 State Legislative Assembly Constituencies in Tamil Nadu, in India

Coordinates: 9.52°N 77.63°E

Srivilliputhur
- Constituency No. 203 for the Tamil Nadu Legislative Assembly

Constituency details
- Country: India
- Region: South India
- State: Tamil Nadu
- District: Virudhunagar
- Lok Sabha constituency: Tenkasi
- Established: 1951
- Total electors: 224,122
- Reservation: SC

Member of Legislative Assembly
- 17th Tamil Nadu Legislative Assembly
- Incumbent A. Karthik
- Party: TVK
- Elected year: 2026

Srivilliputhur is an assembly constituency located in Virudhunagar district in Tamil Nadu. It comes under Tenkasi Lok Sabha constituency. P. S. Kumaraswamy Raja, the former Chief Minister of Madras State, was defeated in this constituency in the 1952 election. It is one of the 234 State Legislative Assembly Constituencies in Tamil Nadu, in India.

== Members of Legislative Assembly ==
=== Madras State ===
Year	Winner	Party	Runner up	Party
1952	1) D. K. Raja; 3) A. Vaikuntam	IND; INC	2) P. S. Kumaraswamy Raja; 4) K. Arumugha Perumal	INC; IND
1957	1) R. Krishnasamy Naidu; 2) A. Chinnasami	INC; INC	3) S. Alagarsamy; 4) G. A. Appan	CPI; IND
1962	M. Chelliah	INC	G. Gurusamy	DMK
1967	K. A. A. Gurusamy	DMK	S. P. Dharmaraj	INC

=== Tamil Nadu ===
Year	Winner	Party
1971	K. Gurusamy alias Andi	Dravida Munnetra Kazhagam
1977	R. Thamaraikani	All India Anna Dravida Munnetra Kazhagam
1980	R. Thamaraikani	All India Anna Dravida Munnetra Kazhagam
1984	R. Thamaraikani	All India Anna Dravida Munnetra Kazhagam
1989	A. Thangam	Dravida Munnetra Kazhagam
1991	R. Thamaraikani	Independent
1996	R. Thamaraikani	All India Anna Dravida Munnetra Kazhagam
2001	R. T. Inbathamilan	All India Anna Dravida Munnetra Kazhagam
2006	T. Ramasamy	Communist Party of India
2011	V. Ponnupandi	Communist Party of India
2016	M. Chandra Prabha	All India Anna Dravida Munnetra Kazhagam
2021	E. M. Manraj	All India Anna Dravida Munnetra Kazhagam
2026	A. Karthik	Tamilaga Vettri Kazhagam

== Election results ==
Vote share of winning candidates
2026	33.93%
2021	38.09%
2016	49.32%
2011	47.79%
2006	40.92%
2001	43.88%
1996	38.50%
1991	34.28%
1989	38.65%
1984	53.35%
1980	52.36%
1977	31.91%
1971	63.34%
1967	53.34%
1962	57.60%
1957	26.22%
1952	20.43%

=== 2026 ===
2026 Tamil Nadu Legislative Assembly election: Srivilliputhur
Party	Candidate	Votes	%	±%
TVK	Karthik A	65,653	33.93	New
CPI	Mahalingam P	57,072	29.50	
AIADMK	Chandraprabha M	42,839	22.14	▼16.29
NTK	Karikalapandiyan A	13,274	6.86	▼4.24
NOTA	NOTA	873	0.45	
Margin of victory		8,581		
Turnout				
Rejected ballots				
Registered electors		222,367		
TVK gain from AIADMK		Swing		

=== 2021 ===
2021 Tamil Nadu Legislative Assembly election: Srivilliputhur
Party	Candidate	Votes	%	±%
AIADMK	E. M. Manraj	70,475	38.43%	−10.89
INC	P. S. W. Madhavarao	57,737	31.49%	New
AMMK	S. Sangeethapriya	23,682	12.91%	New
NTK	B. Abinaya	20,348	11.10%	+8.95
PT	S. Shanthi	4,985	2.72%	New
MNM	K. Guruvaiya	3,512	1.92%	New
NOTA	NOTA	1,666	0.91%	−0.3
Tamil Nadu Ilangyar Katchi	Dr. V. Irulandi	942	0.51%	New
Margin of victory		12,738	6.95%	−13.58%
Turnout		183,373	73.16%	−3.45%
Rejected ballots		792	0.43%	
Registered electors		250,640		
AIADMK hold		Swing	-10.89%	

=== 2016 ===
2016 Tamil Nadu Legislative Assembly election: Srivilliputhur
Party	Candidate	Votes	%	±%
AIADMK	M. Chandra Prabha	88,103	49.32%	New
PT	C. Muthukumar	51,430	28.79%	New
CPI	P. Lingam	19,415	10.87%	−36.92
BJP	I. Ramasamy	5,497	3.08%	New
NTK	A. Kalyanasundaram	3,833	2.15%	New
NOTA	NOTA	2,166	1.21%	New
Independent	K. Thamaraiselvam	1,695	0.95%	New
Independent	S. Ganesan	1,631	0.91%	New
PMK	V. Vellaisamy	1,119	0.63%	New
Independent	B. Karthikeyan	958	0.54%	New
Margin of victory		36,673	20.53%	16.48%
Turnout		178,630	76.61%	−3.42%
Registered electors		233,156		
AIADMK gain from CPI		Swing	1.53%	

=== 2011 ===
2011 Tamil Nadu Legislative Assembly election: Srivilliputhur
Party	Candidate	Votes	%	±%
CPI	V. Ponnupandi	73,485	47.79%	+6.87
DMK	R. V. K. Durai	67,257	43.74%	New
Independent	S. Chinnapparaj	5,720	3.72%	New
BSP	I. Sundarraj	1,309	0.85%	−7.17
Independent	M. K. Ganesan	1,263	0.82%	New
Independent	M. Muniyandi	1,248	0.81%	New
Independent	S. Subramanian	1,106	0.72%	New
Independent	P. Sundarammal	1,021	0.66%	New
Margin of victory		6,228	4.05%	−0.83%
Turnout		153,759	80.03%	7.49%
Registered electors		192,117		
CPI hold		Swing	6.87%	

=== 2006 ===
2006 Tamil Nadu Legislative Assembly election: Srivilliputhur
Party	Candidate	Votes	%	±%
CPI	T. Ramasamy	55,473	40.92%	New
AIADMK	R. Vinayagamoorthy	48,857	36.04%	−7.84
DMDK	R. Dhamothara Kannan	11,218	8.28%	New
BSP	T. Ramaraj	10,876	8.02%	New
AIFB	P. Murugan	3,699	2.73%	New
Independent	P. Rajendran	1,590	1.17%	New
BJP	P. Gnana Pandithan	1,264	0.93%	−35.37
Independent	A. Ramasamy	801	0.59%	New
Margin of victory		6,616	4.88%	−2.70%
Turnout		135,549	72.55%	11.93%
Registered electors		186,842		
CPI gain from AIADMK		Swing	-2.96%	

=== 2001 ===
2001 Tamil Nadu Legislative Assembly election: Srivilliputhur
Party	Candidate	Votes	%	±%
AIADMK	R. T. Inbathamilan	53,095	43.88%	+5.38
BJP	S. Mohanrajulu	43,921	36.30%	+35.22
Independent	R. Thamaraikani	15,928	13.16%	New
Independent	G. Parameswaran	2,385	1.97%	New
Independent	K. Manokaran	2,031	1.68%	New
Independent	P. Jeyaraj	1,784	1.47%	New
Margin of victory		9,174	7.58%	0.83%
Turnout		120,994	60.61%	−12.15%
Registered electors		199,642		
AIADMK hold		Swing	5.38%	

=== 1996 ===
1996 Tamil Nadu Legislative Assembly election: Srivilliputhur
Party	Candidate	Votes	%	±%
AIADMK	R. Thamaraikani	49,436	38.50%	+5.25
CPI	T. Ramasamy	40,769	31.75%	+2.59
JP	E. M. Gurusamy	20,364	15.86%	New
MDMK	M. Sivasubramanian	12,246	9.54%	New
BJP	G. Sivaramakrishnan	1,385	1.08%	New
Independent	M. K. Manokaran	762	0.59%	New
Margin of victory		8,667	6.75%	5.72%
Turnout		128,393	72.77%	4.68%
Registered electors		183,930		
AIADMK gain from Independent		Swing	4.22%	

=== 1991 ===
1991 Tamil Nadu Legislative Assembly election: Srivilliputhur
Party	Candidate	Votes	%	±%
Independent	R. Thamaraikani	38,908	34.28%	New
AIADMK	R. Vinayagamoorthi	37,739	33.25%	+6.03
CPI	R. Venkadasami	33,102	29.16%	New
PMK	K. Radhamani	2,183	1.92%	New
Independent	A. Ramasamy	600	0.53%	New
Margin of victory		1,169	1.03%	−10.40%
Turnout		113,502	68.08%	−9.08%
Registered electors		172,833		
Independent gain from DMK		Swing	-4.37%	

=== 1989 ===
1989 Tamil Nadu Legislative Assembly election: Srivilliputhur
Party	Candidate	Votes	%	±%
DMK	A. Thangam	45,628	38.65%	−6.66
AIADMK	R. Thamaraikani	32,133	27.22%	−26.14
INC	K. Suppu	21,126	17.89%	New
AIADMK	R. Vinayakamoorthy	14,375	12.18%	−41.18
Independent	K. Govindan	1,193	1.01%	New
Independent	M. Thangaiah	989	0.84%	New
Margin of victory		13,495	11.43%	3.38%
Turnout		118,063	77.16%	0.89%
Registered electors		156,247		
DMK gain from AIADMK		Swing	-14.71%	

=== 1984 ===
1984 Tamil Nadu Legislative Assembly election: Srivilliputhur
Party	Candidate	Votes	%	±%
AIADMK	R. Thamaraikani	54,458	53.35%	+0.99
DMK	P. Senivasan	46,245	45.31%	New
Margin of victory		8,213	8.05%	−11.68%
Turnout		102,072	76.27%	6.21%
Registered electors		139,529		
AIADMK hold		Swing	0.99%	

=== 1980 ===
1980 Tamil Nadu Legislative Assembly election: Srivilliputhur
Party	Candidate	Votes	%	±%
AIADMK	R. Thamaraikani	46,882	52.36%	+20.45
INC	P. Karruppiah Thevar	29,216	32.63%	New
Independent	T. Kalasalingam	12,459	13.92%	New
Margin of victory		17,666	19.73%	11.12%
Turnout		89,536	70.06%	2.69%
Registered electors		129,712		
AIADMK hold		Swing	20.45%	

=== 1977 ===
1977 Tamil Nadu Legislative Assembly election: Srivilliputhur
Party	Candidate	Votes	%	±%
AIADMK	R. Thamaraikani	25,990	31.91%	New
DMK	V. Vaikundam	18,974	23.30%	−40.04
CPI	S. Alagarasami	18,876	23.18%	New
JP	A. A. Anandan	14,901	18.30%	New
Independent	S. Sandiran	1,590	1.95%	New
Independent	G. Karuppiah Alias Arivarasan	446	0.55%	New
Margin of victory		7,016	8.61%	−18.06%
Turnout		81,447	67.37%	−4.85%
Registered electors		122,386		
AIADMK gain from DMK		Swing	-31.43%	

=== 1971 ===
1971 Tamil Nadu Legislative Assembly election: Srivilliputhur
Party	Candidate	Votes	%	±%
DMK	K. Gurusamy Alias Andi	41,522	63.34%	+9.99
INC	S. P. Dharmaraj	24,036	36.66%	−3.69
Margin of victory		17,486	26.67%	13.69%
Turnout		65,558	72.22%	−6.26%
Registered electors		97,077		
DMK hold		Swing	9.99%	

=== 1967 ===
1967 Madras Legislative Assembly election: Srivilliputhur
Party	Candidate	Votes	%	±%
DMK	K. A. A. Gurusamy	36,732	53.34%	+10.94
INC	S. P. Dharmaraj	27,791	40.36%	−17.24
CPI	K. Paliyan	4,339	6.30%	New
Margin of victory		8,941	12.98%	−2.21%
Turnout		68,862	78.47%	7.30%
Registered electors		92,069		
DMK gain from INC		Swing	-4.25%	

=== 1962 ===
1962 Madras Legislative Assembly election: Srivilliputhur
Party	Candidate	Votes	%	±%
INC	M. Chelliah	36,122	57.60%	+31.37
DMK	G. Gurusamy Alias Andi	26,595	42.40%	New
Margin of victory		9,527	15.19%	5.43%
Turnout		62,717	71.18%	−26.81%
Registered electors		92,752		
INC hold		Swing	31.37%	

=== 1957 ===
1957 Madras Legislative Assembly election: Srivilliputhur
Party	Candidate	Votes	%	±%
INC	R. Krishnasamy Naidu	49,498	26.22%	+5.86
INC	A. Chinnasami	31,070	16.46%	−3.9
CPI	S. Alagarsamy	26,181	13.87%	New
Independent	Gurusami	20,250	10.73%	New
Independent	G. A. Appan (Sc)	18,214	9.65%	New
Independent	M. Singappan (Sc)	18,047	9.56%	New
Independent	P. S. Chinnavenkata Raja	9,781	5.18%	New
Independent	S. Chelliah (Sc)	8,551	4.53%	New
Independent	K. Karuppanan (Sc)	5,386	2.85%	New
Independent	K. A. Ramasami Raja	1,022	0.54%	New
Independent	M. Dharmar Thevar	758	0.40%	New
Margin of victory		18,428	9.76%	9.69%
Turnout		188,758	97.99%	−20.99%
Registered electors		192,625		
INC gain from Independent		Swing	5.79%	

=== 1952 ===
1952 Madras Legislative Assembly election: Srivilliputhur
Party	Candidate	Votes	%	±%
Independent	D. K. Raja	35,473	20.43%	New
INC	P. S. Kumaraswamy Raja	35,355	20.36%	New
INC	A. Vaikuntam	25,172	14.50%	New
Independent	K. Arumugha Perumal	15,860	9.13%	New
Independent	M. Siruguppa	15,286	8.80%	New
Independent	S. K. Muthuswami Thevar	13,755	7.92%	New
Socialist Party (India)	S. P. Dharmaraj	9,496	5.47%	New
Independent	S. Annamalai	8,589	4.95%	New
Independent	G. A. Appan	8,432	4.86%	New
Independent	C. Govinda Tharaganar	6,210	3.58%	New
Margin of victory		118	0.07%	
Turnout		173,628	118.98%	
Registered electors		145,933		
Independent win (new seat)				
