= M. Chandra Prabha =

Indian politician

Member of the Tamil Nadu Legislative Assembly
- In office 16 May 2016 – 12 May 2021
- Preceded by: V. Ponnupandi
- Succeeded by: E. M. Manraj
- Constituency: Srivilliputhur

Personal details
- Party: All India Anna Dravida Munnetra Kazhagam

M. Chandra Prabha is an Indian politician who served as a Member of Legislative Assembly of Tamil Nadu. He was elected from Srivilliputhur Assembly constituency as an All India Anna Dravida Munnetra Kazhagam candidate in 2016.
