= People's Welfare Party =

People's Welfare Party may refer to:

- People's Welfare Party (Malaysia), Parti Kesejahteraan Insan Tanah Air (KITA)
- People's Welfare Party (PBG) in Granada (Parliament of Andalusia constituency)
- People's Welfare Front, an Indian political alliance
