= K. Gurusamy =

K. Gurusamy may refer to:

- Gurusamy Kandasamy, Malaysian footballer
- K. Gurusamy (politician), Indian politician
