= A. Karthik =

Indian politician (born 1989)

Azhagarsamy Karthik (born 1989) is an Indian politician from Tamil Nadu. He is a member of the Tamil Nadu Legislative Assembly from the Srivilliputhur Assembly constituency, which is reserved for Scheduled Caste community, in Virudhunagar district representing the Tamilaga Vettri Kazhagam.

== Early life ==
Karthik is from Srivilliputhur, Virudhunagar district, Tamil Nadu. He is the son of A. Azhagarsamy. He did his Masters in Education at Sundarewari College of Education, Malli, in 2020 after he completed his M.A. at Manonmaniam University in 2018. He runs his own business and his wife is a nurse. He declared assets worth Rs.1 crore in his affidavit to the Election Commission of India.

== Career ==
Karthik won the Srivilliputhur Assembly constituency representing the Tamilaga Vettri Kazhagam in the 2026 Tamil Nadu Legislative Assembly election. He polled 65,653 votes and defeated his nearest rival, P. Mahalingam of the Dravida Munnetra Kazhagam, by a margin of 8,581 votes.
