= Act of entrustment =

Legal basis for public services

An act of entrustment is a legal requirement under European Union law to ensure that financial compensation for public services is not classified as "state aid" under the Treaty on the Functioning of the European Union (TFEU). This concept helps distinguish lawful public service funding from prohibited subsidies that distort competition in the internal market.

== Legal Basis ==
Article 106(2) of the TFEU (formerly Article 86(2) of the European Communities Treaty) provides a framework for ensuring that public services are subject to competition rules without compromising their ability to fulfill specific tasks. It states:

Undertakings entrusted with the operation of services of general economic interest or having the character of a revenue-producing monopoly shall be subject to the rules contained in the Treaties, in particular to the rules on competition, in so far as the application of such rules does not obstruct the performance, in law or in fact, of the particular tasks assigned to them. The development of trade must not be affected to such an extent as would be contrary to the interests of the Union.

—

== The Altmark Case and Criteria ==
In its judgment in the case of Altmark Trans GmbH and Regierungsprasidium Magdeburg v. Nahverkehrsgesellschaft Altmark GmbH (the Altmark case), the Court of Justice of the European Union held that public sector compensation does not constitute state aid if the following four criteria are all met:

1. Defined Obligations: The organisation receiving funds must have clearly defined public service obligations.
2. Transparent Parameters: The method for calculating compensation must be pre-determined and transparent.
3. Proportionality: Compensation must cover only the necessary costs for delivering the service, including reasonable profit.
4. Selection or Cost Analysis: The organisation must either be selected through competitive bidding or be evaluated based on the costs of an efficient, well-run entity.

== Requirements for Acts of Entrustment ==
The European Commission has stated that an "act of entrustment" is necessary in order to set out the public service obligations of the undertaking and must have been committed to the organisation through an official act having legal force under the national law of the relevant EU member state. There need not be any specific legal framework covering acts of entrustment, but the act must extend sufficiently to create an obligation or accountability: permission, such as legal recognition or regulatory approval would not be sufficient. The obligation may be set out in legislation, the terms of a contract or in certain cases in a grant agreement. The act of entrustment should, in particular, state the nature, territorial scope and duration of the public service obligations, the organisation concerned, and the nature of any exclusive or special rights which the organisation may be able to exercise, along with the mechanism for calculating the level of compensation.
