= A. Chinnasami =

Indian politician

A. Chinnasami was an Indian politician and former Member of the Legislative Assembly of Tamil Nadu. He was elected to the Tamil Nadu legislative assembly as an Indian National Congress candidate from Srivilliputhur constituency in 1957 election. He was one of the two winners in the constituency, the other being Indian National Congress candidate R. Krishnasamy Naidu.
