= Makkal Nalla Kottani =

Indian political alliance

Makkal Nala Kottani Political Alliance
- Founded: 2015
- Dissolved: 2017
- Membership: Desiya Murpokku Dravida Kazhagam; Marumalarchi Dravida Munnetra Kazhagam; Viduthalai Chiruthaigal Katchi; Tamil Maanila Congress; Communist Party of India; Communist Party of India (Marxist)
- Seats in Tamil Nadu Legislative Assembly: 0 / 234

Makkal Nalla Kootani (MNK), formerly People's Welfare Front (PWF) was a Tamil-Nadu political alliance formed in October 2015. It consisted of six political parties: Leading the alliance, the Desiya Murpokku Dravida Kazhagam (DMDK), Marumalarchi Dravida Munnetra Kazhagam (MDMK), Viduthalai Chiruthaigal Katchi (VCK), Tamil Maanila Congress (TMC-(M))Communist Party of India (CPI) and Communist Party of India (Marxist) (CPI-(M)). The alliance contested the 2016 Tamil Nadu and Puducherry legislative assembly elections as one unit. The alliance rejected potential alliance with Indian National Congress, BJP, DMK or ADMK, while was hopeful of enlisting Tamil Maanila Congress and Puthiya Tamilagam.

In early November 2015, the alliance led movements against price rise, atrocities against minorities and Dalits and efforts to curtail freedom of speech. It has taken a strong position in favour of liquor prohibition in Tamil Nadu. Later it made an electoral alliance with DMDK and Tamil Maanila Congress.

== Policies ==
The alliance consists of two Dravidian parties (DMDK and MDMK), Two Tamil Parties (TMC(M) and VCK) and two leftist parties (CPI and CPI(M)). People's Welfare Front released a Common Minimum Program which all parties agreed to. The major features of the program are as below.

- Oppose globalisation, liberalisation economic policies and stop the privatisation of state programmes and industries
- Oppose Hindutva, religious extremism and religious prosecution
- Oppose powers exploiting caste – work to pass stricter laws preventing violence and discrimination against Dalits
- Oppose corruption – implement Lokayukta
- Implement transparent government – information about laws and programs will be released online
- Increase funding and support for local governance units – implement Right to Public Services legislation in Tamil Nadu
- Stop the stealing of minerals
- Promote social justice – preserve 69% reservation, expand reservation in the private sector
- Mother tongue development – make multilingual education ("first-language-first") mandatory
- Promote folk arts – establish a university to develop folk arts
- Work for increase powers and funding for states
- Work to resolve river water issues
- Support Sri Lankan Tamils in pursuit of justice and rights
- Law and order – prevent police brutality
- Protect democratic rights – fully protect freedom of expression
- Prohibition – fully implement liquor prohibition in Tamil Nadu
- Development of agriculture and villages – provide funding and infrastructure services for farmers
- Land – protect arable land
- Irrigation – maintain and modernise major irrigation systems
- Homes and homelessness – provide homes for all without homes
- Promote crafts and small businesses
- Electricity – make Tamil Nadu self-sufficient in producing electricity
- Labour rights – introduce minimum wage of ₹ 15,000 per month
- Education – prevent privatisation of education and develop competitive public educational systems
- Health – allocate 6% to health; create a multi-purpose public medical training facility in each district
- Environment – implement stricter environmental standards
- Employment – fill the two lakhs vacancies without corruption
- Elimination of poverty – correctly identify people below poverty line (BPL) and deliver welfare services to them
- Rural employment scheme – increase wages given under rural employment guarantee
- City people – provide safe drinking water, develop underground sewage system
- Women welfare – ensure that the state women commission works effectively and reports the results in the state assembly
- Fishing communities welfare – stop multi-national companies (MNCs) from using sea resources; provide pensions to fishers
- Minority rights – take strong actions against Hindutva religious violence and hate speech
- Civil service and teachers – make part-time and shift workers permanent
- Democratic reform – recommend proportional representation; work for 50% reservation for women in elected offices
- Inflation – stop online and future trading activities
- Public distribution – provide basic necessities including fruits and vegetables at subsidised prices
- Science and Technology – build a central science and technology advanced research centre in southern Tamil Nadu
- Sports – Make exercise mandatory for all levels until class 12
- Transportation – Increase number of buses to reduce congestion
- Road accidents – Separate traffic by building dividers

== Electoral Performance ==
2016 Tamil Nadu Legislative Assembly election
Party/Alliance		Votes	%	Seats		
Party/Alliance		Votes	%	Contested	Won	+/-
People's Welfare Front (PWF)	Desiya Murpokku Dravida Kazhagam	1,037,431	2.41%	105	0	▼29
People's Welfare Front (PWF)	Marumalarchi Dravida Munnetra Kazhagam	373,713	0.87%	28	0	Steady
People's Welfare Front (PWF)	Communist Party of India	340,290	0.79%	25	0	▼9
People's Welfare Front (PWF)	Viduthalai Chiruthaigal Katchi	331,849	0.77%	25	0	Steady
People's Welfare Front (PWF)	Communist Party of India (Marxist)	307,303	0.72%	25	0	▼10
People's Welfare Front (PWF)	Tamil Maanila Congress	230,711	0.54%	26	0	Steady
People's Welfare Front (PWF)	Total	2,621,297	6.1	234	0	▼48

== Withdrawals ==
Political Party	ECI Status	Date	Reason for Withdrawal
Tamil Maanila Congress (Moopanar)	Unrecognised Party	20 June 2016	Quit and later Aligned with the AIADMK-led Alliance
Desiya Murpokku Dravida Kazhagam	State Party	22 June 2016	Quit and later Aligned with the AIADMK-led Alliance
Marumalarchi Dravida Munnetra Kazhagam	Unrecognised Party	27 December 2016	Quit the front over the differences and later Aligned with the DMK Alliance
Viduthalai Chiruthaigal Katchi	State Party	25 November 2017	Aligned with the DMK Alliance ahead of R.K. Nagar Byelection
Communist Party of India	State Party	27 November 2017	Aligned with the DMK Alliance ahead of R.K. Nagar Byelection
Communist Party of India (Marxist)	National Party	30 November 2017	Aligned with the DMK Alliance ahead of R.K. Nagar Byelection
