= M. Chelliah =

Indian politician

M. Chelliah was an Indian politician and former Member of the Legislative Assembly. He was elected to the Tamil Nadu Legislative Assembly as an Indian National Congress candidate from Srivilliputhur constituency in 1962 election.
