= R. Annadurai =

Indian politician

R. Annadurai is an Indian politician, belonging to the Communist Party of India (Marxist) (CPI(M)).

R. Annadurai began his political career in the Democratic Youth Federation of India (DYFI). He was the Madurai District Committee president of DYFI for ten years. He became the secretary of the Madurai (Urban) District Committee of the CPI(M) in 2008. Annadurai has been jailed several times in connection with different agitations.

Annadurai contested the Madurai South constituency in the 2011 Tamil Nadu legislative assembly election, supported by the All India Anna Dravida Munnetra Kazhagam-led coalition. Annadurai won the seat having obtained 83,441 votes (61.92%), defeating the Indian National Congress candidate S. P. Varadarajan.

The elections of 2016 resulted in his constituency being won by S. S. Saravanan.
