= M. Boominathan =

Indian politician

Member of the Tamil Nadu Legislative Assembly
- In office 12 May 2021 – 10 May 2026
- Preceded by: S. S. Saravanan
- Succeeded by: M. M. Gopison
- Constituency: Madurai South

Personal details
- Party: Marumalarchi Dravida Munnetra Kazhagam
- Parent: V. Muniyandi (father)

Muniyandi Boominathan is an Indian politician who is a Member of Legislative Assembly of Tamil Nadu. He was elected from Madurai South as an Marumalarchi Dravida Munnetra Kazhagam candidate in 2021.

== Electoral performance ==
2021 Tamil Nadu Legislative Assembly election: Madurai (South)
Party	Candidate	Votes	%	±%
MDMK	M. Boominathan	62,812	42.49	+15.94
AIADMK	S. S. Saravanan	56,297	38.08	−4.67
MNM	G. Eswaran	12,821	8.67	New
AMMK	Sha. Raajalingam	2,672	1.81	New
NOTA	None of the above	1,551	1.05	−0.94
Margin of victory		6,515	4.41	−11.80
Turnout		147,833	64.24	−2.60
Rejected ballots		131	0.09	
Registered electors		230,133		
MDMK gain from AIADMK		Swing	-0.27	

2016 Tamil Nadu Legislative Assembly election: Madurai (South)
Party	Candidate	Votes	%	±%
AIADMK	S. S. Saravanan	62,683	42.75	New
DMK	M. Balachandran	38,920	26.55	New
MDMK	M. Boominathan	19,443	13.26	New
BJP	A. R. Mahalakshmi	16,069	10.96	+6.38
NOTA	None of the above	2,918	1.99	New
Margin of victory		23,763	16.21	−17.34
Turnout		146,611	66.84	−8.96
Registered electors		219,349		
AIADMK gain from CPI(M)		Swing	-18.84	
