= Odisha Right to Public Services Act, 2012 =

Odisha Legislative Assembly
- Long title: An Act to Provide for the Delivery of Public Services to the Citizens Within the Given Time Limit and for Matters Connected Therewith and Incidental Thereto.
- Citation: Act No. 8 of 2012
- Enacted by: Odisha Legislative Assembly

The Odisha Right to Public Services Act, 2012 (Act No. 8 of 2012) is an Act of Odisha Legislative Assembly to cover various guarantees under a single umbrella at the state level. The idea is to generate a demand for services, and to provide citizens with a platform for getting their grievances redressed in a time bound manner.

== History ==
Odisha Right to Public Services Act, 2012 in Odisha is an initiative by the State Government to check corruption in public service delivery. The law enables the citizens to demand public services as a right and also includes a provision for penal action against officials failing to provide the services within the stipulated time. It looks towards addressing the growing demand of citizens for improved public services, reducing corruption through imposing penalties on Public Authorities for default in delivery of services and aims at universalization of public services. In addition, what was under the Citizens’ Charters, an administrative guarantee has been translated into a legal right, justiciable under the provisions of ORTPS Act.

== Salient features ==
- Different services which a citizen can obtain from different Departments will be notified, along with time limit for delivery of such services.
- For delivery of each service notified, there shall be a Designated Officer to whom the citizen can make an application. The Designated Officer will provide the said service in a time bound manner.
- In case a citizen is unable to get the said services within the prescribed time limit, he/she may file an appeal before an Appellate Authority. The Appellate Authority will consider the case and pass necessary order.
- Any citizen aggrieved with the order of the Appellate Authority or in case of delay in providing the service within the prescribed time limit, may file a revision petition before the Revisional Authority.
- If the Revisional Authority found that the Designated Officer has failed to provide the service without sufficient and reasonable cause, he may impose a penalty against the Designated Officer not exceeding Rs.5000/-.
- If the Revisional Authority observed that there is delay in providing the service, beyond the stipulated time, he may also impose a penalty not exceeding Rs.250/- per each day of delay.
- The penalty shall be charged from the Designated Officer, Appellate Authority and the concerned subordinate staff, as the case may be and shall be in the proportion, to be decided by the Revisional Authority.
- However, the Designated Officer, Appellate Authority and subordinate staff, will be given a reasonable opportunity of being heard before any penalty is imposed on him/her.
- Non-compliance of the order of the Revisional Authority shall amount to misconduct and make such Government servant liable for disciplinary action.

=== Important sections ===
==== Section 3(1) ====
3. (1) The State Government may, by notification, from time to time, declare the services, to which this Act shall apply and specify the time limit within which the services shall be provided.

==== Section 4(1) ====
4. (1) An eligible person shall make an application to the Designated Officer for obtaining any service under the provisions of this Act.

=== Execution ===
In order to implement the provisions of the Act, the State Government has enacted The Odisha Right to Public Services Rules, 2012. Under the Rules, 34 services has been included in the first phase.
