= A. Vaikuntam =

Indian politician

A. Vaikuntam (Tamil: அ. வைகுந்தம்) was an Indian politician and former Member of the Legislative Assembly. He was elected to the Tamil Nadu Legislative Assembly as an Indian National Congress candidate from Srivilliputhur constituency in 1952 election. He was one of the two winners in the constituency, the other being Independent candidate D. K. Raja.
