= M. M. Gopison =

Indian politician

Member of the Tamil Nadu Legislative Assembly
- Incumbent
- Assumed office 2026
- Preceded by: M. Boominathan
- Constituency: Madurai South

Personal details
- Party: Tamilaga Vettri Kazhagam
- Profession: Politician

M. M. Gopison is an Indian politician from Tamil Nadu. He is a member of the Tamil Nadu Legislative Assembly from Madurai South representing Tamilaga Vettri Kazhagam.

== Political career ==
Gopison won the Madurai South seat in the 2026 Tamil Nadu Legislative Assembly election as a candidate of Tamilaga Vettri Kazhagam. He received 62,415 votes and defeated M. Boominathan of the Dravida Munnetra Kazhagam by a margin of 21,529 votes.
