= 2025 TASMAC scam =

Financial scam in India

The 2025 TASMAC scam is an alleged financial scandal involving Tamil Nadu’s state-run liquor company, TASMAC (Tamil Nadu State Marketing Corporation).

On 23 May 2025, the Supreme Court of India stayed an investigation by the Enforcement Directorate (ED).

== Overview ==
On 13 March 2025, TASMAC came under intense scrutiny following allegations of large-scale corruption. The ED alleged that a network involving politicians, bureaucrats, and distillery owners siphoned off more than ₹1,000 crore (US$100 million) through manipulated tenders, inflated expenses, and illegal transactions. Also, irregularities were found in transport and bar license tenders, which involved fake documentation and favoritism.

According to V. Senthil Balaji, Tamil Nadu Excise Minister; the ED is used by the Central Government to target rival parties and leaders, particularly before an election, with Tamil Nadu set to hold one next year. He also emphasized that the raids were conducted as a pressure tactic amid the ongoing battle between the Dravida Munnetra Kazhagam vs. Bharatiya Janata Party battle over "Hindi imposition" and "delimitation."

== Investigation ==
Distillery companies such as SNJ, Kals, Accord, SAIFL, and Shiva Distillery—along with bottling entities such as Devi Bottles, Crystal Bottles, and GLR Holding—colluded with senior government officials to secure undue favors, leading to large-scale financial fraud.

On 23 May 2025, the Supreme Court of India granted a stay on an investigation by ED. During the proceedings, the Court expressed concerns that the ED may have exceeded its jurisdiction, raising questions about potential encroachment on India’s federal structure. It also noted issues regarding the initiation of a case against a state-run corporation, particularly in light of the fact that the Government of Tamil Nadu had already registered multiple FIRs related to the matter.
