= N. Soundararajan =

Indian politician

N. Soundararajan was an Indian politician and former Member of Parliament. He was elected to the Lok Sabha as an Anna Dravida Munnetra Kazhagam candidate from Sivakasi Lok Sabha constituency in the 1980 and 1984 elections.
