= A. Ravichandran =

Indian politician

Member of parliament
- In office 16 May 2004 — 16 May 2009
- Preceded by: Vaiko
- Succeeded by: Manickam Tagore
- Constituency: Sivakasi

Personal details
- Born: 5 July 1965 (age 60) Virudhu Nagar, Tamil Nadu
- Party: MDMK
- Spouse: Renuga
- Children: 2 daughters
- As of 22 September, 2006

A. Ravichandran (born 5 July 1965) was a member of the 14th Lok Sabha of India. He represents the Sivakasi constituency of Tamil Nadu and is a member of the Marumalarchi Dravida Munnetra Kazhagam (MDMK) political party.
