= D. K. Raja =

Indian politician

D. K. Raja was an Indian politician and former Member of the Legislative Assembly of Tamil Nadu. He was elected to the Tamil Nadu legislative assembly as an Independent candidate from Srivilliputhur constituency in 1952 election. He was one of the two winners in the constituency, the other being Indian National Congress candidate A. Vaikuntam.
