= Public service =

Service provided to all members of a community

Tbilisi Public Service Hall Building, Tbilisi, Georgia

A public service or service of general (economic) interest is any service intended to address the needs of aggregate members of a community, whether provided directly by a public sector agency, via public financing available to private businesses or voluntary organisations, or by private businesses subject to government regulation. Some public services are provided on behalf of a government's residents or in the interest of its citizens. The term is associated with a social consensus (usually expressed through democratic elections) that certain services should be available to all, regardless of income, physical ability or mental acuity. Examples of such services include the fire services, police, air force, paramedics and public service broadcasting.

Even where public services are neither publicly provided nor publicly financed, they are usually subject to regulation beyond that applying to most economic sectors for social and political reasons. Public policy, when made in the public's interest and with its motivations, is a type of public service.

== Sectors ==
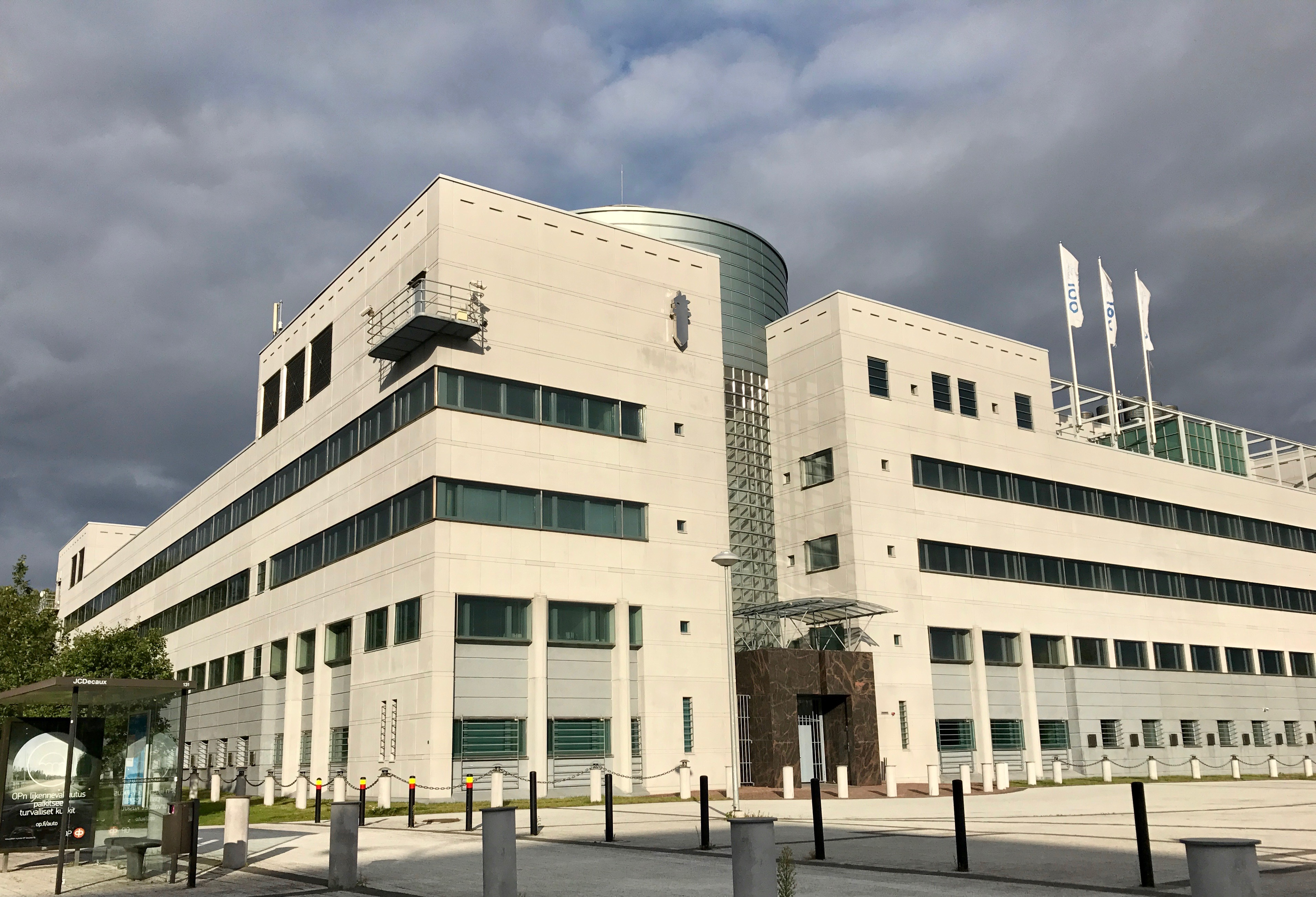
The National Bureau of Investigation (NBI) headquarters building in Tikkurila, Vantaa, Finland

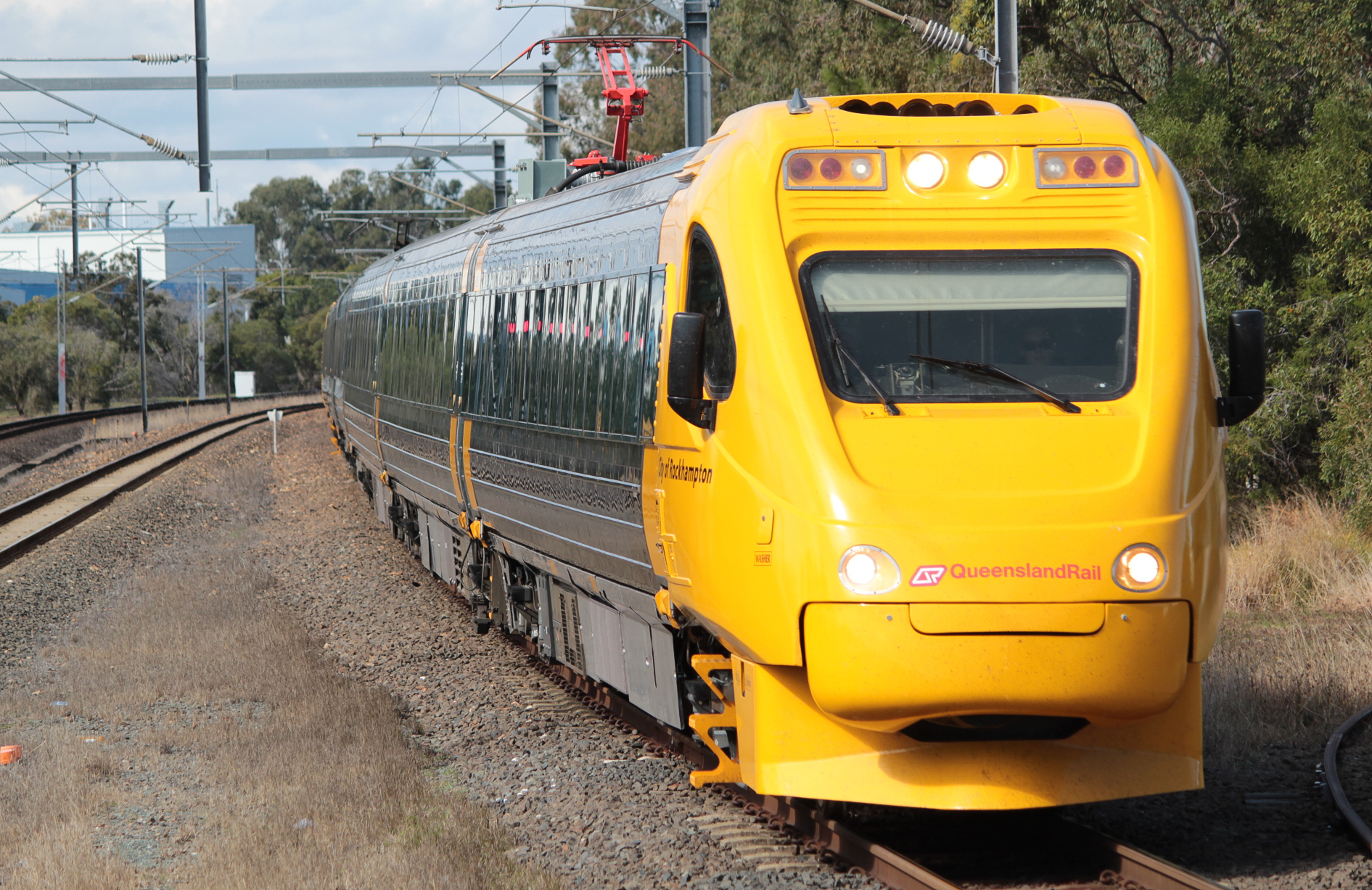
Trains are a public service in Australia.

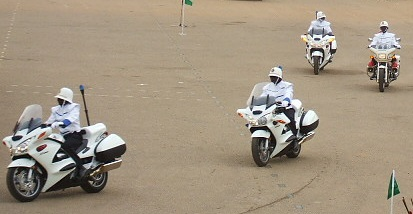
A unit of the Ghana Police Service

In modern developed countries, the term "public services" (or "services of general interest") often includes:

- Courts
- Education
- Electricity
- Emergency services
- Environmental protection
- Health care
- Mail
- Military
- Policing
- Public buildings
- Public broadcasting
- Public libraries
- Public parks
- Public policy-making
- Public utilities
- Public transportation
- Social services
- State school
- Telecommunications
- Transportation infrastructure
- Urban planning
- Waste management
- Water supply network

In developing countries, public services tend to be much less well developed. For example, water services might be available only to the wealthy middle class. For political reasons, the service is often subsidized, reducing the finance potentially available for expansion to poorer communities. Key bottlenecks faced by LSD of public goods and services in developing countries can be broadly classified under the Triangulation Framework of policy, institutions and finance. Policy constraints include a centralized "one-size-fits-all" mindset where national standards do not consider variations in socioeconomic conditions across regions, among others. Institutional issues include unclear function assignments, fragmentation of responsibilities across agencies, and lack of local capacity. Fiscal issues include excessive reliance on fiscal transfers from national government (e.g., Internal Revenue Allotments), and low own-source revenue generation that limits resources to extend coverage to the marginalized and poor. The United Nations Sustainable Development Goal 5 is a global initiative that aims to influence the provision of public services and infrastructure to marginalized demographics.

== History ==
Governing bodies have long provided core public services. The tradition of keeping citizens secure through organized military defense dates to at least 4,000 years ago.

Maintaining order through local delegated authority originated at least as early as the Warring States period (5th to 3rd centuries BCE) in ancient China with the institution of xiàn (prefectures) under the control of a centrally appointed prefect. Historical evidence of state provision of dispute resolution through a legal/justice system goes back at least as far as ancient Egypt.

A primary public service in ancient history involved ensuring the general favor of the gods through a theologically and ceremonially correct state religion.

The widespread provision of public utilities as public services in developed countries began in the late 19th century, often with the municipal development of gas and water services. Later, governments began to provide other services such as electricity and health care. In most developed countries, local or national governments continue to provide such services, the biggest exceptions being the US and the UK, where private provision is arguably proportionally more significant. Nonetheless, such privately provided public services are often strongly regulated, for example (in the US) by Public Utility Commissions.

Examples noted in a history of public services in Oxford include street repair, cleansing, and lighting, drainage and sewage disposal, water, gas and electricity supply, police and fire services, the Post Office, transport, hospital services, and the provision of baths, parks and cemeteries.

In the 21st century, debt crises have made it difficult for developing countries to maintain and develop public services. The US Treasury has urged multilateral global lenders such as the World Bank, International Monetary Fund, and regional development banks to help protect public services in debt-distressed countries.

== Characteristics ==
A public service may sometimes have the characteristics of a public good (being non-rivalrous and non-excludable), but most are services that may (according to prevailing social norms) be under-provided by the market. In most cases public services are services, i.e., they do not involve manufacturing of goods. They may be provided by local or national monopolies, especially in sectors that are natural monopolies.

They may involve outputs that are hard to attribute to specific individual effort or to measure in terms of key characteristics such as quality. They often require high levels of training and education. They may attract people with a public service ethos who wish to give something to the wider public or community through their work.

In the UK, the process of assessing the needs of the people of an area and then designing and securing an appropriate public service to meet those needs, is often called commissioning. Commissioned services may be delivered by organisations in the public sector, private sector or third sector: when the private or third sector is involved, the process of commissioning is usually linked with a process of procurement, to determine who will provide the services, at what cost and on what terms. Commissioning is often seen as a cyclical process.

== Implications ==
Public services can be constructed, coordinated and operated in many ways or forms. They include government agencies, independent state-funded institutes, government-coordinated organizations, civil society, military agencies and volunteers.

=== Government employees ===
Government agencies are not profit-oriented and their employees are often motivated differently. Studies of their work have found contrasting results, including both higher levels of effort and fewer hours of work. A survey in the UK found that private-sector hiring managers do not credit government experience as much as private-sector experience. Public workers tend to have lower wages when adjusting for education, although that difference is reduced when benefits and hours are included. Public servants have other intangible benefits such as increased job security and high wages.

=== Need satisfaction and sustainability ===
A study concluded that public services are associated with higher human need satisfaction and lower energy requirements while contemporary forms of economic growth are linked with the opposite. Authors find that the contemporary economic system is structurally misaligned with goals of sustainable development and that to date no nation can provide decent living standards at sustainable levels of energy and resource use. They provide analysis of factors in social provisioning and assess that improving beneficial provisioning-factors and infrastructure would allow for sustainable forms of need satisfaction.

=== Choice ===
Open Public Services, a white paper published by the Cameron–Clegg coalition in the United Kingdom in 2011, aimed to create a comprehensive policy framework for "good public services". It set out the coalition's programme for reform of public services, described as one of "wide ambitions" expected to be implemented over a period of time, not all at once. Five principles were to underlie open public services:

- Choice, wherever possible
- Decentralisation to the lowest appropriate level
- Diversity
- Fairness
- Accountablity

The journalist David Boyle conducted an independent review for the UK's Treasury and the Cabinet Office on public demand for choice in public services, which reported in 2013. The principle of choice where possible was embodied in the Choice Charter, published on 16 May 2013, where four choice principles were outlined:

- Allowing people a say in how public services are provided for them
- Allowing people the opportunity to exercise choice where it is available
- Making clear, accessible and high-quality information available to support choice
- Facilitating complaints over the degree of choice offered as well as over the quality of services

Between December 2012 and May 2013, "Choice Frameworks" were scheduled for publication covering NHS care, social housing, school education, early years education and adult social care.

=== Nationalization ===
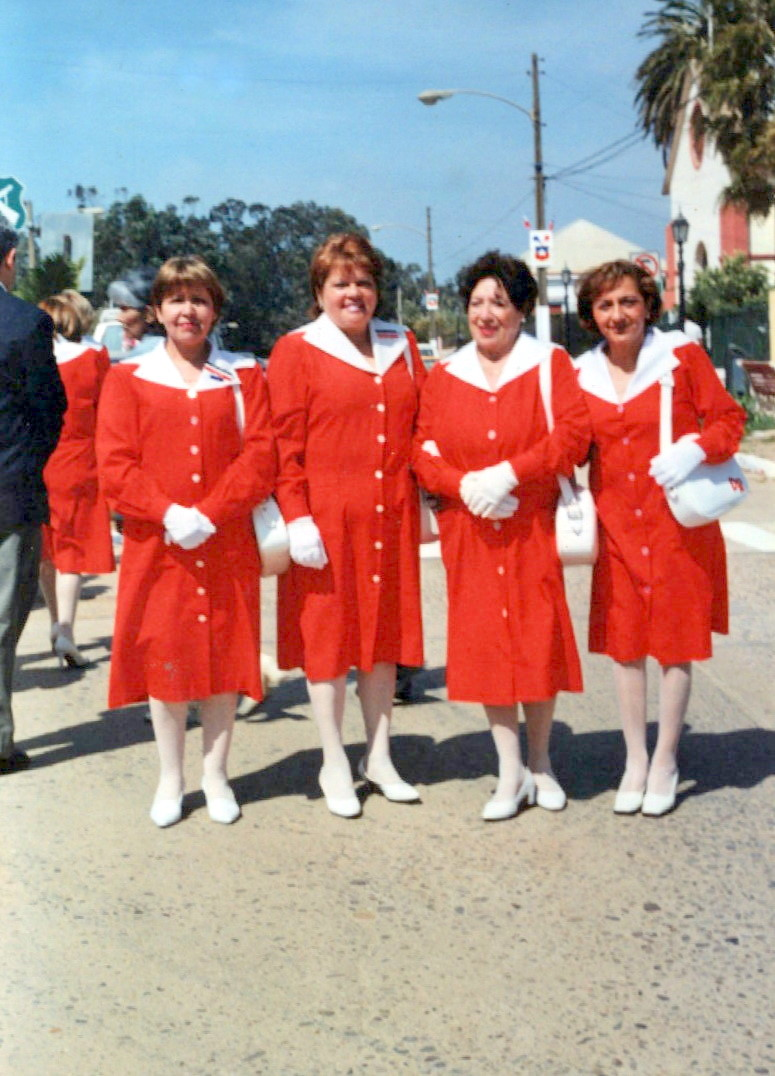
A group of Chilean Damas de Rojo, volunteers at their local hospital

Nationalization took off following the world wars of the first half of the 20th century. In parts of Europe, central planning was implemented in the belief that it would make production more efficient. Many public services, especially electricity, fossil fuels and public transport are products of this era. After World War II, many countries also began to implement universal health care and expanded education under the funding and guidance of the state.

=== Privatization ===
There are several ways to privatize public services. A free-market corporation may be established and sold to private investors, relinquishing government control altogether. Thus it becomes a private, not public, service. Another option, used in the Nordic countries, is to establish a corporation but keep ownership or voting power essentially in the hands of the government. For example, the Finnish state owned 49% of Kemira until 2007, with the rest owned by private investors. A 49% share did not make it a "government enterprise", but it meant that all other investors together would have to oppose the state's opinion to overturn the state's decisions.

A regulated corporation can also acquire permits on the agreement that they fulfill certain public service duties. When a private corporation runs a natural monopoly, the corporation is typically heavily regulated, to prevent abuse of monopoly power. Lastly, the government can buy a service on the free market. In many countries, medication is provided in this manner: the government reimburses part of the medication's price. Bus traffic, electricity, healthcare and waste management are also privatized in this way. One recent innovation, used in the UK increasingly as well as in Australia and Canada, is public-private partnerships, which involve giving a long lease to private consortia in return for partly or fully funding infrastructure costs.

== See also ==
- Act of entrustment
- Certificate of public convenience and necessity
- Civil service
- Community service
- Good governance
- Infrastructure
- Labour Relations (Public Service) Convention, 1978
- New Public Management
- Right to Public Services legislation
  - The Odisha Right to Public Services Act, 2012
- Public-sector trade union
- SGI Europe
- United Nations Public Service Awards
- United Nations Public Service Day
- Universal basic services
