= Madurai South Assembly constituency =

One of the 234 State Legislative Assembly Constituencies in Tamil Nadu, in India

Coordinates: 9°52′41″N 78°02′20″E

Madurai (South)
- Constituency No. 192 for the Tamil Nadu Legislative Assembly

Constituency details
- Country: India
- Region: South India
- State: Tamil Nadu
- District: Madurai
- Lok Sabha constituency: Madurai
- Established: 1951
- Total electors: 1,80,003
- Reservation: None

Member of Legislative Assembly
- 17th Tamil Nadu Legislative Assembly
- Incumbent M. M. Gopison
- Party: TVK
- Elected year: 2026

Madurai South is a legislative assembly constituency in the Indian state of Tamil Nadu. It is one of the 234 State Legislative Assembly Constituencies in Tamil Nadu, in India. Elections and winners from this constituency are listed below.

== Extent of Assembly constituency ==
- Madurai South Taluk (part)
- Madurai (M Corp.) Ward No.9, 10, 16, 39 and 43 to 59

This is a new constituency which includes majority of the erstwhile Madurai East constituency.

== Members of Legislative Assembly ==
Year	Winner	Party
2011	R. Annadurai	Communist Party of India (Marxist)
2016	S. S. Saravanan	All India Anna Dravida Munnetra Kazhagam
2021	M. Boominathan	Marumalarchi Dravida Munnetra Kazhagam
2026	M. M. Gopison	Tamilaga Vettri Kazhagam

== Election results ==
Vote share of winning candidates
2026	44.11%
2021	42.49%
2016	42.75%
2011	61.59%
1952	46.95%

=== 2026 ===
2026 Tamil Nadu Legislative Assembly election: Madurai (South)
Party	Candidate	Votes	%	±%
TVK	M. M. Gopison	62,415	44.11	New
MDMK (DMK)	M. Boominathan	40,886	28.89	▼13.60
BJP	Prof. Raama Srinivasan	31,100	21.98	−
NOTA	NOTA	612	0.43	▼0.62
Margin of victory		21,529	15.22	▲10.80
Turnout		1,41,503	78.61	
Registered electors		1,80,003		
TVK gain from DMK		Swing	▲44.11	

=== 2021 ===
2021 Tamil Nadu Legislative Assembly election: Madurai (South)
Party	Candidate	Votes	%	±%
MDMK	M. Boominathan	62,812	42.49	+15.94
AIADMK	S. S. Saravanan	56,297	38.08	−4.67
MNM	G. Eswaran	12,821	8.67	New
AMMK	Sha. Raajalingam	2,672	1.81	New
NOTA	None of the above	1,551	1.05	−0.94
Margin of victory		6,515	4.41	−11.80
Turnout		147,833	64.24	−2.60
Rejected ballots		131	0.09	
Registered electors		230,133		
MDMK gain from AIADMK		Swing	-0.27	

=== 2016 ===
2016 Tamil Nadu Legislative Assembly election: Madurai (South)
Party	Candidate	Votes	%	±%
AIADMK	S. S. Saravanan	62,683	42.75	New
DMK	M. Balachandran	38,920	26.55	New
MDMK	M. Boominathan	19,443	13.26	New
BJP	A. R. Mahalakshmi	16,069	10.96	+6.38
NOTA	None of the above	2,918	1.99	New
Margin of victory		23,763	16.21	−17.34
Turnout		146,611	66.84	−8.96
Registered electors		219,349		
AIADMK gain from CPI(M)		Swing	-18.84	

=== 2011 ===
2011 Tamil Nadu Legislative Assembly election: Madurai (South)
Party	Candidate	Votes	%	±%
CPI(M)	R. Annadurai	83,441	61.59	New
INC	S. P. Varadharajan	37,990	28.04	New
Independent	K. Anuppanadi Jeya	6,243	4.61	New
BJP	N. S. R. Santharam	6,204	4.58	New
IJK	A. Josephine Mary	1,061	0.78	New
Margin of victory		45,451	33.55	
Turnout		178,736	75.79	
Registered electors		135,472		
CPI(M) win (new seat)				

=== 1952 ===
1952 Madras Legislative Assembly election: Madurai (South)
Party	Candidate	Votes	%	±%
INC	T. K. Rama	20,838	46.95	New
Independent	A. Dharmaraj Santhosam	18,070	40.72	New
Independent	K. N. Krishnan	3,277	7.38	New
KMPP	Vidi V. Krishnan	1,101	2.48	New
Independent	K. R. C. Chari	1,095	2.47	New
Margin of victory		2,768	6.24	
Turnout		44,381	64.96	
Registered electors		68,320		
INC win (new seat)				
