= K. A. A. Gurusamy =

Indian politician

K. A. A. Gurusamy was an Indian politician and former Member of the Legislative Assembly. He was elected to the Tamil Nadu legislative assembly as a Dravida Munnetra Kazhagam candidate from Srivilliputhur constituency in the 1967 election.
