= Karnataka Sakala Services Act, 2011 =

The Karnataka Sakala Services Act, 2011 was passed in 2011 to provide guarantee of services to citizens in the Indian state of Karnataka with a stipulated time limiting to citizen related services. The act came to be known as the Sakala act since November 2012. Karnataka is the tenth state to incorporate an act under Right to Public Services legislation. The Sakala program is backed by a comprehensive information technology network, developed by the National Informatics Centre (NIC) to provide solutions and services and to monitor the services.

The sakala team is currently headed by D Roopa IPS and the project overall reports to Principal Secretary, Department of Personnel and Administrative reforms (Services) after the recent reorganisation.

== Coverage ==
The pilot phase of the Sakala was launched on 1 March 2012 in northernmost backward taluk of Aurad in Bidar district and in three other Taluks of Chitradurga, Dharwad and Dakshina Kannada districts. The program was fully launched on 1 April, covering the entire state with 151 services in 11 departments.

The second phase began on 2 November 2012 wherein 114 additional services have been added taking the total to 265.

The third phase began on 16 August 2013 wherein 110 services have been added taking the total to 375.

During the fourth phase in September 2013, another 44 services have been added to the Sakala Umbrella – taking Sakala to 419 services.

In the fifth phase, an additional 28 services were added taking the total to 447 services. In the sixth phase, on 6 February 2014, an additional 32 services were added taking the total to 478 services spanning across 47 departments with 135 services offered online. This is the highest number of services among the states having Time Bound Services to citizens’ act in the country. About 46 million applications have been received under Sakala till April 2014. The services are extended to all 6.12 crore citizens of the state. Few services include Caste & income certificate (Revenue Dept.), Residence certificate (Revenue Dept.), Registration of Birth and Death (Urban development & Revenue Dept.), Driving license (Transport Dept.), Khatha transfer documents (Urban development), Issue and modifications of Ration cards (Food Dept.), Survey and Settlement (Revenue), House plan Sanction (Urban Local Bodies), Copy of FIR/Petitions (Police Dept.)

== Technology and e-governance ==
A comprehensive IT solution has been developed by National Informatics Centre (NIC), to enable implementation of the Act by providing a transparent on-line monitoring mechanism for the services requested by a citizen. In each of 30 Districts District Magistrate is the Chief Nodal Officer and a dedicated IT Consultant is provided by Sakala Mission Whenever the request is made, the citizen receives an acknowledgement slip with a unique 15 digit number called the Guarantee of Services to Citizen (GSC) number.

== Grievance redressal ==
In case the application is rejected or if the service is not provided within the stipulated time, citizens can file an appeal before the competent officer (CO) to redress their grievance quoting the GSC number. The competent officer will hear the appeal and redress the grievance within the specified time. Citizens can claim in cash the compensatory cost of Rs. 20 per day for the delayed period subject to a maximum of Rs. 500 from the CO, upfront. The same shall be deducted from the salary of the designated officer or his subordinate responsible for delay or default, written 30 days.

== Sakala Sakhi ==
The Karnataka Department of Personnel and Administrative reforms, started a new project ‘SakalaSakhi’. The goal of this project to deliver Women and child development schemes effectively in Haliyal Taluka. The project was started on 25 January and was announced by Hon’ble Minister for Higher education & Tourism, Shri R.V. Deshpande. Sakala Sakhis are women enlisted at district, tehsil and village levels to help women avail Sakala services under Women & Child department. Sakala Sakhis will be trained by the government to learn information on the schemes, online application process and follow-up.
