= E. M. Manraj =

Indian politician

Member of the Tamil Nadu Legislative Assembly
- In office 12 May 2021 – 11 May 2026
- Preceded by: M. Chandra Prabha
- Constituency: Srivilliputhur

Personal details
- Party: All India Anna Dravida Munnetra Kazhagam
- Parent: E. Marimuthu (father)

E. Marimuthu Manraj is an Indian politician who is a Member of Legislative Assembly of Tamil Nadu. He was elected from Srivilliputhur as an All India Anna Dravida Munnetra Kazhagam candidate in 2021.

== Elections contested ==
Election	Constituency	Party	Result	Vote %	Runner-up	Runner-up Party	Runner-up vote %
2021 Tamil Nadu Legislative Assembly election	Srivilliputhur	ADMK	Won	38.43%	P. S. W. Madhavarao	INC	31.49%
