= V. Ponnupandi =

Indian politician

V. Ponnupandi is an Indian politician and incumbent Member of the Tamil Nadu Legislative Assembly from the Srivilliputhur constituency. He represents the Communist Party of India.
