= Durai Vaiko =

Indian businessman and politician (born 1972)

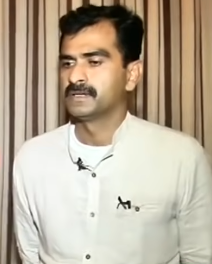
- Vaiyapuri in 2019

Member of Parliament, Lok Sabha
- Incumbent
- Assumed office 4 June 2024
- Preceded by: Su. Thirunavukkarasar
- Constituency: Tiruchirappalli, Tamil Nadu

Principal Secretary of Marumalarchi Dravida Munnetra Kazhagam
- Incumbent
- Assumed office 20 October 2021
- Preceded by: Vaiko

Leader of MDMK Parliamentary Party in Lok Sabha
- Incumbent
- Assumed office 4 June 2024
- Preceded by: A. Ganeshamurthy

Personal details
- Born: Durai Vaiyapuri; 2 April 1972 (age 54) Tirunelveli, Tamil Nadu, India
- Party: Marumalarchi Dravida Munnetra Kazhagam
- Spouse: Geetha Vaiyapuri (m. 1998)
- Children: 2
- Parent: Vaiko (father)
- Education: Master of Business Administration
- Occupation: Activist; Politician; businessman

Durai Vaiko (born 2 April 1972) is an Indian politician of the Marumalarchi Dravida Munnetra Kazhagam party (MDMK). He was appointed as the MDMK principal secretary of the party, and leads internet campaigns for MDMK. His political career began when his father contested the Lok Sabha election from Virudhunagar constituency in 2014.

In June 2024, he was elected as Member of the Lok Sabha from Tiruchirappalli constituency.

== Personal life ==
Durai Vaiyapuri is the son of Vaiko, founder of MDMK and his wife Renuka Devi who was born on 2 April 1972. He has two sisters and graduated with an MBA. He married Geetha on 29 November 1998, with whom he has two children.

== Philanthropy ==
In 2021, during the second wave of the COVID-19 pandemic in India, Durai Vaiko set up COVID information centres in Ezhayirampannai, Alankulam, Sathirpati, Padandhal and Sattur in Virudhunagar District.
