= Nandhini (anti-liquor-activist) =

Nandhini Anandan is an anti-liquor-activist from India who, for the past five years, has been leading an anti-liquor movement across Tamil-nadu. She does campaigns along with her father at public places to raise awareness regarding some of the ill-effects of alcohol. She has been arrested, 55 times as of 2016, due to her protests.
