= Vaiko =

Indian politician (born 1944)

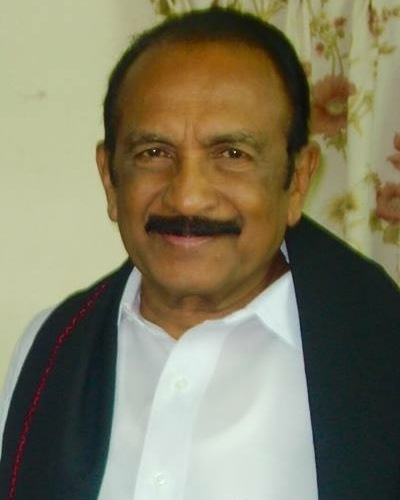
- Vaiko in 2017

Member of Parliament, Rajya Sabha
- In office 25 July 2019 – 24 July 2025
- Constituency: Tamil Nadu
- In office 3 April 1978 – 2 April 1996
- Constituency: Tamil Nadu

Member of Parliament, Lok Sabha
- In office 19 March 1998 – 17 May 2004
- Preceded by: V. Alagirisamy
- Succeeded by: A. Ravichandran
- Constituency: Sivakasi, Tamil Nadu

General Secretary of the Marumalarchi Dravida Munnetra Kazhagam
- Incumbent
- Assumed office 6 May 1994
- Preceded by: Office established

Personal details
- Born: Vaiyapuri Gopalsamy Naiyakar; 22 May 1944 (age 82) Kalingapatti, Madras Province, British India (present-day Tamil Nadu, India)
- Party: Marumalarchi Dravida Munnetra Kazhagam (since 1994)
- Other political affiliations: Dravida Munnetra Kazhagam (1964–1993)
- Spouse: Renuka Devi (m. 1971)
- Children: 3, including Durai Vaiyapuri
- Education: St. Xavier's College, Palayamkottai, Presidency College, Chennai, Madras Law College
- Occupation: Politician; lawyer; stage speaker

Vaiko (born Vaiyapuri Gopalsamy Naiyakar; 22 May 1944) is an Indian politician. He was a member of the Rajya Sabha, the upper house of the Parliament of India from Tamil Nadu. He is the founder and General Secretary of the Marumalarchi Dravida Munnetra Kazhagam (MDMK), a political party active mainly in the Indian state of Tamil Nadu. He was earlier elected to the Lok Sabha, the lower house of the Parliament of India from Sivakasi, Tamil Nadu. He is the father of Trichy MP Durai Vaiyapuri.

== Early life and education ==
Vaiko was born as Vaiyapuri Gopalsamy Naiyakar on 22 May 1944 to Vaiyapuri Naidu and Mariyammal in Kalingapatty near Sankarankovil, Madras Presidency.

He graduated with a gold medal in his Bachelor of Arts degree in economics from St. Xavier's College, Palayamkottai and masters from Presidency College, Chennai. He obtained his bachelor's degree in law from Madras Law College. He is an avid reader and orator known for his oratory skills both in Tamil and English.

== Personal life ==
Vaiko married Renuka Devi on 14 June 1971, with whom he has two daughters, Rajalakshmi and Kannagi, and a son, Durai Vaiyapuri. They reside in Chennai.

== Political career ==
Vaiko is now the general secretary of the MDMK party. Vaiko was a part of Dravida Munnetra Kazhagam (DMK) and was formerly a close colleague of former Chief Minister of Tamil Nadu, Kalaignar M. Karunanidhi. Vaiko has been involved in and led anti-Hindi agitations of Tamil Nadu.

He entered the Rajya Sabha in 1978 and has been member of the Upper House for three terms. He has also been elected to the Lok Sabha twice.

Vaiko was known as "Lion Of Parliament" due to his vociferous speeches in Parliament. Vaiko protested against Kerala's demand for a new dam at Mullaperiyar and proposed building of dams in Pambar and Siruvani. Vaiko also supported national interlinking of rivers and Sethusamudram Shipping Canal Project. Vaiko filed a Public Interest Litigation (PIL) in Madras High Court requesting closure of the copper smelting plant of Sterlite Industries in Tuticorin which did not follow the waste management procedures correctly and leading to the closure of the plant.

Vaiko often goes on foot marches along with his party cadres to attract attention to issues.

=== Support of LTTE ===
Vaiko unequivocally supported Liberation Tigers of Tamil Eelam (LTTE) and other organizations fighting for a separate Tamil Eelam country in Sri Lanka. He made a trip to Eelam 1989 at the height of the Tamil Tigers war with Sri Lankan Army when IPKF Indian Peace Keeping Force was at Jaffna. Vaiko was the first member of Parliament and chief of a registered political party in the country to be detained under the Prevention of Terrorism Act, 2002 by Jayalalithaa government. He was released after spending 18 months in prison.

In 2008, Criminal Investigation Department of Tamil Nadu police arrested Vaiko on charges of sedition. The charges stemmed from speeches Vaiko made at a party meeting on the Sri Lankan issue and the government's raids into LTTE-held areas on 21 October 2008. After 14 days in judicial custody, Vaiko was released.

Vaiko has said that India should retract its ban on the LTTE, claiming the ban was a shield to suppress freedom of expression and stifle the voice of the Opposition.

On 3 April 2017, Vaiko was jailed in for sedition case filed by DMK in their 2010 regime.

== Election Contested ==
=== Lok Sabha ===
Year	Constituency	Party	Votes	%	Opponent	Opponent Party	Opponent Votes	%	Result	Margin	%
1996	Sivakasi	MDMK	204,339	25.3	V. Alagirisamy	CPI	238,483	29.5	Lost	-34,144	-4.2
1998	Sivakasi	MDMK	387,694	49.6	V. Alagirisamy	CPI	252,771	32.3	Won	134,923	17.3
1999	Sivakasi	MDMK	325,829	41.2	V. Ramasamy	AIADMK	251,048	31.7	Won	74,781	9.5
2009	Virudhunagar	MDMK	291,423	37.96	B. Manickam Tagore	INC	307,187	40.02	Lost	-15,764	-2.06
2014	Virudhunagar	MDMK	261,143	25.81	T. Radhakrishnan	AIADMK	406,694	40.2	Lost	-145,551	-14.39

=== Rajya Sabha ===
Position	Party	Constituency	From	To	Tenure
Member of Parliament, Rajya Sabha (1st Term)	DMK	Tamil Nadu	3 April 1978	2 April 1984	5 years, 365 days
Member of Parliament, Rajya Sabha (2nd Term)	DMK	Tamil Nadu	3 April 1984	2 April 1990	5 years, 364 days
Member of Parliament, Rajya Sabha (3rd Term)	DMK	Tamil Nadu	3 April 1990	2 April 1996	5 years, 365 days
Member of Parliament, Rajya Sabha (4th Term)	MDMK	Tamil Nadu	25 July 2019	24 July 2025	5 years, 364 days

== Philanthropy ==
In 2005, Vaiko started the Marumalarchi Blood Donors' Club. Vaiko has launched many engagement programmes in rural areas with the participation of villagers. Vaiko has undergone a month-long padayatra in Tamil Nadu for the interlinking of interstate rivers in India. Vaiko during the time he represented Sivakasi Constituency in Loksabha conducted several medical camps for his constituents. He conducted medical camps for physically disabled people in his constituency with the help of Sri Venkateshwara Medical College, Thirupathi. Thousands of people afflicted by polio attended the camp and were given medical aid including corrective surgery at Thirupathi and Whitefield, Bengaluru and post-surgery aid, equipments, etc.,. He conducted medical camps for providing the Hepatitis B vaccine for children and provided vaccines for 65000 children in his constituency. Considering the logistics and the planning involved in providing the vaccines in three doses to 65000 children, the program was successful without a hitch. And considering the fact that all these medical camps were organized by Mr. Vaiko without any government help and with his own money, it itself states the philanthropic, pioneer nature of the leader.

== Personal life ==
He married Renuka Devi on 14 June 1971. Vaiko enjoys writing in his free time and has authored over 50 books (Tamil & English) apart from regular essays and columns in newspapers.

== Documentary film ==
Six decades of the political life of Vaiko were filmed by Durai Vaiko and released by the Chief Minister of Tamil Nadu M. K. Stalin, K. Veeramani, R. Nallakannu, K. S. Alagiri, Thol. Thirumavalavan, K. Balakrishnan (CPI-M), R Mutharasan (CPI), T. Velmurugan, Khadar Mohideen (IUML) and M H Jawahirullah (MMK) in Sathyam Cinemas.

Lok Sabha
Preceded by V. Alagirisamy	Member of Parliament for Sivakasi; 1998 – 2004	Succeeded by A. Ravichandran
