= Right to Public Services legislation =

Important legislation in the field of delivery of services to the citizen

Right to Public Services legislation in India comprises statutory laws which guarantee time bound delivery of services for various public services rendered by the Government to citizen and provides mechanism for punishing the errant public servant who is deficient in providing the service stipulated under the statute. Right to Service legislation are meant to reduce corruption among the government officials and to increase transparency and public accountability. Madhya Pradesh became the first state in India to enact Right to Service Act on 18 August 2010 and Bihar was the second to enact this bill on 25 July 2011. Several other states like Bihar, Delhi, Punjab, Rajasthan, Himachal Pradesh, Kerala, Uttarakhand, Haryana, Uttar Pradesh, Odisha, Jharkhand Maharashtra, West Bengal and Mizoram have introduced similar legislation for effectuating the right to service to the citizen.

As of 2025, 22 States and Union Territories have enacted Right to Service legislations.

== Framework ==
The common framework of the legislations in various states includes, granting of "right to public services", which are to be provided to the public by the designated official within the stipulated time frame. The public services which are to be granted as a right under the legislations are generally notified separately through Gazette notification. Some of the common public services which are to be provided within the fixed time frame as a right under the Acts, includes issuing caste, birth, marriage and domicile certificates, electric connections, voter's card, ration cards, copies of land records, etc.

On failure to provide the service by the designated officer within the given time or rejected to provide the service, the aggrieved person can approach the First Appellate Authority. The First Appellate Authority, after making a hearing, can accept or reject the appeal by making a written order stating the reasons for the order and intimate the same to the applicant, and can order the public servant to provide the service to the applicant.

An appeal can be made from the order of the First Appellate Authority to the Second Appellate Authority, who can either accept or reject the application, by making a written order stating the reasons for the order and intimate the same to the applicant, and can order the public servant to provide the service to the applicant or can impose penalty on the designated officer for deficiency of service without any reasonable cause, which can range from Rs. 500 to Rs. 5000 or may recommend disciplinary proceedings. The applicant may be compensated out of the penalty imposed on the officer. The appellate authorities has been granted certain powers of a Civil Court while trying a suit under Code of Civil Procedure, 1908, like production of documents and issuance of summon to the Designated officers and appellants.

== Implementing states ==
State	Act title	Status
Punjab	Right to Public Service Act, 2011	Notified
Uttarakhand	The Uttarakhand Right to Service Act, 2011	Notified
Madhya Pradesh	Madhya Pradesh Lok Sewaon Ke Pradan Ki Guarantee Adhiniyam, 2010	Enacted
Bihar	Bihar Lok sewaon ka adhikar Adhiniyam, 2011	Enacted
Delhi	Delhi (Right of Citizen to Time Bound Delivery of Services) Act, 2011	Notified
Jharkhand	Right to Service Act, 2011	Notified
Himachal Pradesh	Himachal Pradesh Public Services Guarantee Act, 2011	Notified
Rajasthan	Rajasthan Public Service Guarantee Act, 2011	Notified
Uttar Pradesh	Janhit Guarantee Act, 2011	Enacted
Kerala	The Kerala State Right to Service Act,2012	Enacted
Karnataka	The Karnataka (Right Of Citizens to Time Bound Delivery Of Services) Bill, 2011	Notified
Chhattisgarh	Chhattisgarh Lok Seva Guarantee Bill, 2011	Notified
Jammu and Kashmir	The Jammu and Kashmir Public Services Guarantee Act, 2011	Notified
Odisha	Odisha Right to Public Services Act, 2012	Notified
Assam	Assam Right to Public Services Act, 2012	Notified
Central Government	Citizen's Charter and Grievance Redressal Bill 2011	Proposed
Gujarat	Gujarat (Right of Citizens to Public Services) Bill, 2013	Enacted
West Bengal	West Bengal Right to Public Services Bill, 2013	Notified
Goa	The Goa (Right to Time-Bound Delivery of Public Services) Act, 2013	Notified
Haryana	The Haryana Right to Service Act, 2014	Notified
Maharashtra	Maharashtra Right to Public Services Ordinance, 2015	Notified
Mizoram	The Mizoram Right to Public Services Act, 2015	Enacted
