= R. T. Inbathamilan =

Indian politician

R. T. Inbathamizhan is an Indian politician and former Member of the Legislative Assembly. He was elected to the Tamil Nadu legislative assembly as an All India Anna Dravida Munnetra Kazhagam candidate from Srivilliputhur constituency in 2001 election.
