= A. Thangam =

Indian politician

A. Thangam was an Indian politician and former Member of the Legislative Assembly. He was elected to the Tamil Nadu legislative assembly as a Dravida Munnetra Kazhagam candidate from Srivilliputhur constituency in 1989 election.
