= V. Alagirisamy =

Indian politician

V. Alagirisamy was a member of the 11th Lok Sabha of India. He represented the Sivakasi constituency of Tamil Nadu and is a member of the Communist Party of India.
