= TASMAC =

State-owned alcohol sales monopoly in Tamil Nadu, India

- Type: Government-owned corporation
- Industry: Retail and Wholesale alcohol (IMFL) vending
- Founded: 1983
- Headquarters: CMDA Tower-II, IV Floor, Gandhi Irwin Bridge Road, Egmore, Chennai-600008, Tamil Nadu, India
- Key people: K. Vignesh, Minister for Prohibition and Excise, T. Christuraj, IAS; Managing Director
- Net income: ₹ 33,811 Crore in 2021 Source Fin express
- Total assets: 5402 Retail Outlets
- Number of employees: 29,297
- Website: http://tasmac.co.in/

The Tamil Nadu State Marketing Corporation, better known by the acronym TASMAC, (/ˈtɑːsmɑːk/) is an Indian company owned by the Government of Tamil Nadu, which has a monopoly over wholesale and retail vending of alcoholic beverages in the state of Tamil Nadu. It controls the Indian Made Foreign Liquor (IMFL) trade in the state.

== History ==
TASMAC was established in 1983 by then Chief Minister M.G.Ramachandran The state has a long history of prohibition, first implemented partially in 1937 by the Indian National Congress government of C. Rajagopalachari. Between 1973 and 2001, it was lifted briefly during 1971–74, 1981–87 and 1990–91. After 1983, TASMAC was in charge of wholesale liquor sales in the state whenever prohibition was lifted. In 2001, prohibition was lifted again and TASMAC became the wholesale monopoly for alcohol. For retail vending, the state auctioned off licenses for running liquor shops and bars. But this led to the formation of cartels and loss of revenue to the state. The government tried to counter this by introducing a lot system from the financial year 2001–02, where potential bidders bid for shops grouped by revenue. But the lot system could not prevent cartelisation, as bidders later withdrew in favour of others. In October 2003, the government passed an amendment to the Tamil Nadu Prohibition Act, 1937, making TASMAC the sole retail vendor of alcohol in the state. By 2004 all private outlets selling alcohol were either shut down or taken over by the company. This monopoly established by the AIADMK government of J. Jayalalithaa came into effect on 29 November 2003. The DMK government of M. Karunanidhi which took power in 2006, did not revise its predecessor's policy and TASMAC continues to control the alcohol industry in the state.

== Organisation ==
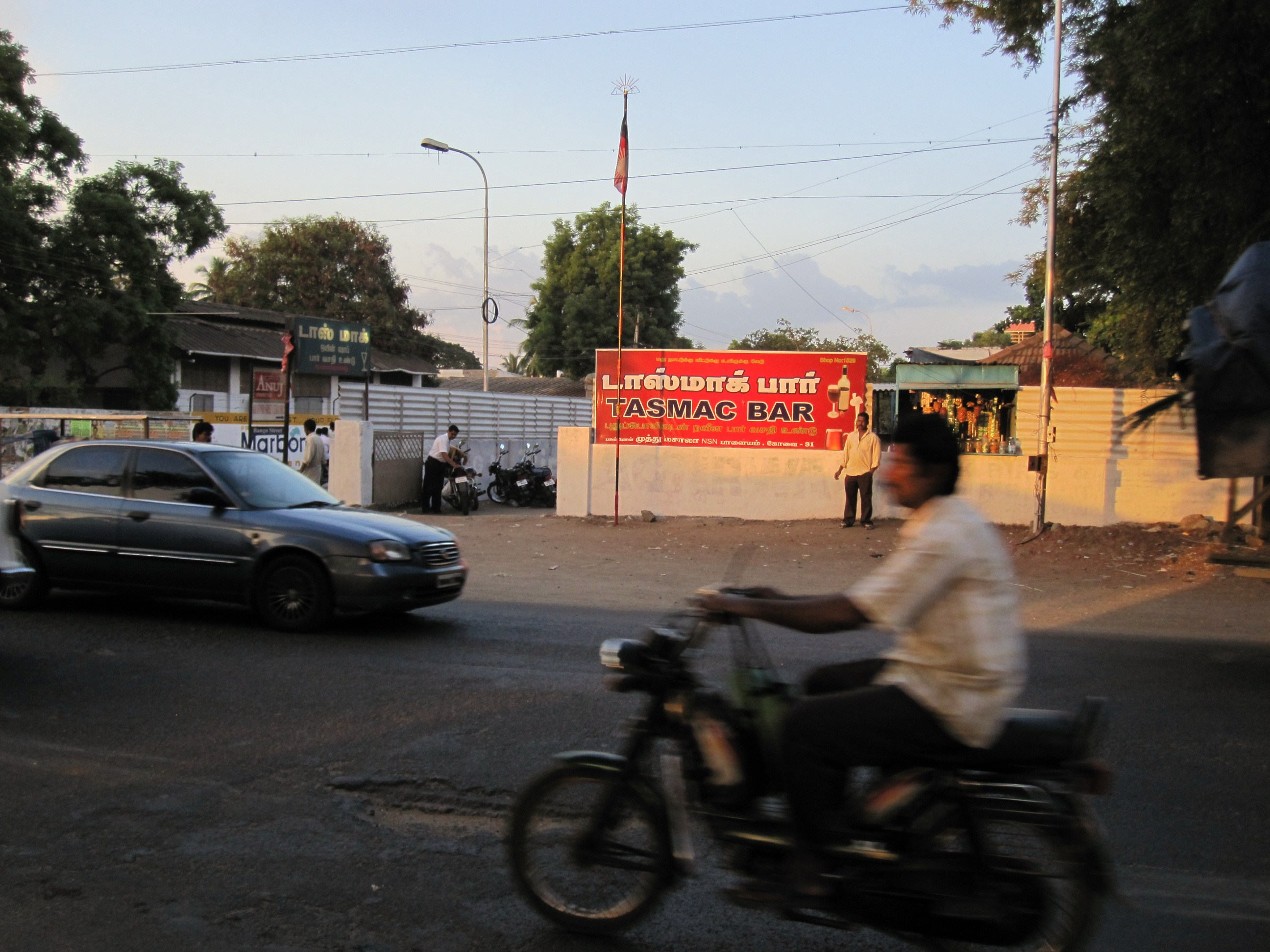
A TASMAC Bar in Coimbatore

TASMAC is wholly owned by the government of Tamil Nadu, coming under the purview of the Ministry of Prohibition and Excise. Its headquarters is situated at the CMDA towers in Egmore, Chennai. It is governed by a board whose members belong to the Indian Administrative Service (IAS). The company organisation is divided territorially into five regions- Chennai, Coimbatore, Madurai, Trichy and Salem each under a regional manager. These regions are further divided into 33 districts run by district managers. As of 2010, the company has around 30,000 employees and operates about 6800 retail liquor outlets throughout the state. Employees of TASMAC are not considered as government employees and are not entitled to the benefits and legal rights (like statutory pay, paid holidays and an 8-hour workday) of other employees of the state. The retail outlets do not have individual names. Instead they are named as "TASMAC Shop XXX", where XXX stands for the outlet number. They are popularly referred to as "wine shops", though they sell other kinds of liquor as well. About half the outlets have bars attached to them.

== Impact ==
The reorganisation of retail alcohol trade in the state has brought record revenues for the government allowing it to increase spending on welfare schemes. While consumption of alcohol has increased among the population, deaths due to consumption of contaminated illicit liquor (common during the prohibition era) have gone down. The monopoly trade has led to widespread irregularities like adulteration, corruption, overpricing and black marketing in the retail outlets. It has also led to increased complaints about disturbances created by drunk patrons from residents in areas where the retail outlets are situated. High retail prices (due to a higher tax rate) and absence of a wide range of choices have led to a thriving alcohol tourism industry in the neighbouring union territory of Puducherry, where alcohol prices are lower and different brands are available. TASMAC has been forced to offer more choices of brands to counter the increase in smuggling of non-available alcohol brands into the state.

== Growth ==
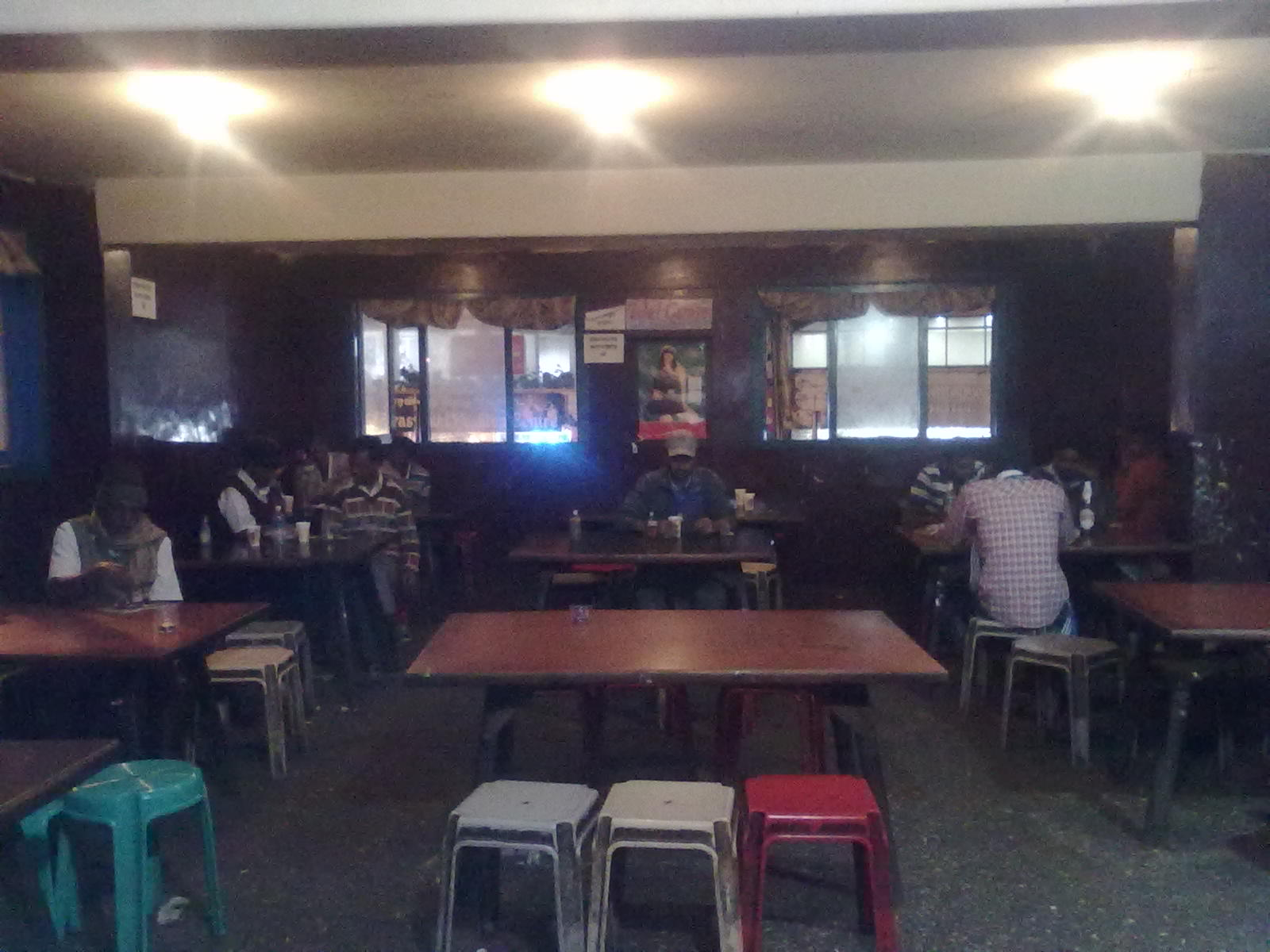
Interior of a TASMAC Bar in Ooty

Since the take over by the government, TASMAC has seen an annual revenue of growth of around 20 percent every year. The turnover in 1983 (the year of incorporation) was ₹183 crores. In 2002–03 before the take over of retail vending, the turnover was ₹3,499.75 crores, out of which the government got a tax revenue of ₹2,828.09 crores. After the take over of retail vending, the tax revenue shot up to ₹3,639 crores in the financial year 2003–04. The tax revenue has two components – excise tax and sales tax each constituting roughly 50% of the total. A large part of the tax revenue is accounted as profit for the state since it is both the wholesale and retail vendor and the difference in the prices goes directly to the state exchequer. In the following four financial years revenue increased to 4872, 6087, 7300 and 8822 Crore Rs respectively. In 2005–06, the 23-year-old record for alcohol sales revenue in the state was broken. The ₹10,000 crore (₹100 Billion) mark was reached in the financial year 2008–09, when the revenue was ₹10,601.5 crores. For the financial years 2009–10 and 2010–11 it stood at ₹12,491 and ₹14,965 Crores respectively. Besides the tax revenue, the company also makes money by selling annual licenses to run bars in its retail outlets. The steady growth in revenue is accounted for by the periodical increase in retail prices and by increasing alcohol consumption in the state. Hard liquors like whiskey, rum, wine, brandy and vodka account for about 80% of the sales and beer accounts for the remaining 20%. The revenue nearly doubled from ₹18,081 crores in 2011 to ₹31,157 crores in 2019.

Annual Revenue of TASMAC
Fiscal Year	Revenue in Crores (₹)	% Change
2002–03	2,828.09	
2003–04	3,639	28.67%
2004–05	4,872	33.88%
2005–06	6,086.95	24.94%
2006–07	7,300	19.93%
2007–08	8,822	20.85%
2008–09	10,601.5	20.17%
2009–10	12,491	17.82%
2010–11	14,965.42	19.80%
2011–12	18,081.16	20.82%
2012–13	21,680.67	19.91%
2013–14	23,401	7.93%
2014–15	26,188	11.91%
2015–16	25,845.58	−6.76%
2016–17	26,995.25	6.97%
2017–18	26,797.96	−0.73%
2018–19	31,157.83	8.39%

== See also ==
- Economy of Tamil Nadu
- Kerala State Beverages Corporation
- Madhubana Kadai
- 2025 TASMAC scam
