= Kalingapatty =

Kalingapatti Sankarankovil
- Village
- Location in Tamil Nadu, India Kalingapatti (India)
- Coordinates: 9.275°N 77.632°E
- Country: India
- State: Tamil Nadu
- District: Tenkasi

Languages
  - Official: Tamil
- Time zone: UTC+5:30 (IST)

Kalingapatty is a panchayat Village in Tenkasi district in the Indian state of Tamil Nadu. This village is under the control of Kuruvikulam block, Sankarankoil taluk

== Notable personalities ==
- Vaiko, MDMK chief & member of Rajya Sabha since 2019 was born in this village
