= K. Gurusamy (politician) =

Indian politician (born 1924)

K. Gurusamy (born 13 January 1924) was an Indian politician and former Member of the Legislative Assembly of Tamil Nadu. He was elected to the Tamil Nadu Legislative Assembly as a candidate of the Dravida Munnetra Kazhagam (DMK) from the Srivilliputhur constituency in the 1971 election.
