= T. Ramasamy (CPI politician) =

Indian politician

T. Ramasamy is an Indian politician and served as a Member of the Legislative Assembly of Tamil Nadu from 2006 to 2011. He was elected to the Tamil Nadu legislative assembly as a Communist Party of India candidate from Srivilliputhur constituency in 2006 election.
