= Marumalarchi Dravida Munnetra Kazhagam =

Indian political party

- Abbreviation: MDMK
- Secretary: Durai Vaiko
- General Secretary: Vaiko
- Lok Sabha Leader: Durai Vaiko
- Founder: Vaiko
- Founded: 6 May 1994; 32 years ago
- Split from: Dravida Munnetra Kazhagam
- Headquarters: Thayagam, 12, Rukmini Lakshmipathi Salai, Egmore, Chennai – 600008, Tamil Nadu, India
- Student wing: MDMK Student Wing
- Youth wing: MDMK Youth Wing
- Women's wing: MDMK Women's Wing
- Labour wing: Marumalarchi Labour Front
- Ideology: Tamil nationalism; Dravidianism; Social democracy; Social justice; Secularism
- Political position: Centre-left
- Colours: Red
- ECI status: Unrecognised parties
- Alliance: INDIA (2023–present) (National); SSJVA (2026–present) (Tamil Nadu); Former Alliances: UPA (2004–2007), (2017–2023) (till dissolved)) (National); National Democratic Alliance (1998–2003) (National); SPA (2017–2026); Democratic Progressive Alliance (2006), (2017–2019); AIADMK+ (1998–1999, 2006–2011) (Tamil Nadu); People's Welfare Front (2016); MDMK Led Alliance (1996–1998)
- Seats in Rajya Sabha: 0 / 245
- Seats in Lok Sabha: 1 / 543
- Seats in Tamil Nadu Legislative Assembly: 0 / 234

Election symbol
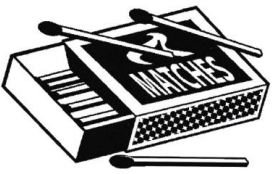

Party flag

Website
- www.mdmk.org.in

The Marumalarchi Dravida Munnetra Kazhagam (transl. Renaissance Dravidian Progressive Federation; abbr. MDMK) is a political party active in the Indian state of Tamil Nadu. It was established by Vaiko in 1994 after he left the Dravida Munnetra Kazhagam. The headquarters of the party is called Thayagam, which is located at Rukmini Lakshmipathi Salai, Egmore, Chennai.

== History ==
=== Formation ===
Vaiko was a member of the Rajya Sabha and a party activist of Dravida Munnetra Kazhagam (DMK). Vaiko was a member of the party from his initial student days and actively participated in the party agitations and courted arrest several times. He was elected thrice to the Rajya Sabha. In 1994, he was forced out of the parent body as he was seen as a threat to DMK chief Karunanidhi's son, M.K. Stalin. Vaiko along with some district secretaries announced the decision to start a rival party, which became the MDMK.

=== Support for Sri Lankan Tamils ===
Vaiko voiced support for Tamils during the Sri Lankan Civil War, including for the Liberation Tigers of Tamil Eelam specifically and their goal of secession from Sri Lanka.

=== Support for the Mullaperiyar Dam ===
The Government of Kerala was keen to demolish the Mullaperiyar Dam because of safety concerns. However, the dam's reservoir is a prime source for irrigation for more than 8 districts including Theni. As a result, Vaiko led an agitation against the Kerala government.

=== Split in MDMK ===
With the looming possibility of a vote of confidence in Parliament against the UPA, two party MPs, L. Ganesan and Gingee N. Ramachandran, claimed that they enjoyed the support of the majority of party cadre and decided to pledge support to the UPA government. They later withdrew their claim and joined DMK when it was found that they had forged letters of support of party executives.

=== Boycott of Assembly Election 2011 ===
Due to issues in seat sharing, MDMK quit the ADMK Alliance and boycotted the 2011 Assembly elections of Tamil Nadu and Puducherry.

=== Sanchi Protest ===
The MDMK protested the Sri Lankan President Mahinda Rajapaksa's visit to Sanchi, Madhya Pradesh in September 2012. Vaiko and his party members traveled to Sanchi. People who traveled through roadways were stopped by the police near Gadchiroli. Some party members tried to reach the spot by rail and air but they were detained by police before reaching Sanchi.

=== MDMK snap ties with NDA ===
The MDMK left the BJP-led National Democratic Alliance in December 2014, accusing the BJP of acting against Tamil interests. This came after heavy criticism of the party from BJP lawmaker Subramanian Swamy.

=== Formation and Departure from Makkal Nalla Kottani [People's Welfare Front (PWF)] ===
As part of the Makkal Nalla Kottani alliance, MDMK (led by Vaiko) participated in the 2016 election campaigning. Leaders released campaign materials such as manifestos and songs to mobilize voters.

Vaiko and Makkal Nalla Kottani leaders spoke publicly about the front as a potential alternative to the traditional major parties; at various points Vaiko claimed that people were disillusioned with AIADMK and DMK rule and expected the front to perform well.

In the 2016 Tamil Nadu Legislative Assembly election, the Makkal Nalla Kottani contested seats across the state, fielding candidates from its constituent parties including MDMK.

However, the Makkal Nalla Kottani failed to make a significant impact in the election results. The major contest was still dominated by the two big regional alliances, and Makkal Nalla Kottani did not win a meaningful share of seats. Independent records show that smaller parties, including Makkal Nalla Kottani partners, were unable to secure victories comparable to the Dravida Munnetra Kazhagam-led or AIADMK alliances.

After the elections, there were reports in late 2016 that MDMK decided to exit the Makkal Nalla Kottani alliance. MDMK general secretary Vaiko publicly announced MDMK’s departure from that coalition amid internal differences and electoral disappointment.

=== Alliance with DMK ===
MDMK formally quit the Makkal Nalla Kottani on 27 December 2016 due to differences following the poor results of the 2016 polls. It notes that after exiting, MDMK later aligned with the Dravida Munnetra Kazhagam-led alliance in subsequent elections.

In December 2017, MDMK decided to support the Dravida Munnetra Kazhagam in the Radhakrishnan Nagar Assembly constituency by-election — marking its first public cooperation with Dravida Munnetra Kazhagam after a break of over a decade. Dravida Munnetra Kazhagam working president M. K. Stalin welcomed MDMK’s support and described it as part of a broader opposition coalition against the then-AIADMK regime.

=== 2019 Indian General Elections ===
In the 2019 Indian general election in Tamil Nadu, the DMK-led Secular Progressive Alliance included several smaller parties such as MDMK, CPI(M), CPI, VCK and others.

As part of that alliance, MDMK was allocated one Lok Sabha seat to contest.

According to Election Commission filings and election data, MDMK fought its 2019 Lok Sabha contest on the DMK’s “Rising Sun” symbol rather than its own independent symbol. Because of this, the Election Commission’s official records count MDMK candidates under the DMK party tally in the final seat-wise results.

=== 2021 Tamil Nadu Legislative Assembly Election ===
In the 2021 Tamil Nadu Legislative Assembly election, the MDMK contested as an ally of the Dravida Munnetra Kazhagam and used the Dravida Munnetra Kazhagam's 'Rising Sun' symbol for all its candidates.

The MDMK was allotted 6 seats as part of the DMK-led Secular Progressive Alliance.

Although party founder Vaiko initially expressed a desire to contest on an independent symbol, he ultimately agreed to use the Dravida Munnetra Kazhagam's Rising Sun symbol due to "practical necessity".

Constituencies Contested: Sattur, Palladam, Madurai South, Vasudevanallur (Reserved), Madurantakam (Reserved), Ariyalur. The MDMK won 4 of the 6 seats it contested under the Rising Sun symbol.

=== 2024 Lok Sabha Elections ===
In the 2024 Lok Sabha elections, the MDMK made a strategic shift by contesting on its own independent symbol rather than the DMK's 'Rising Sun'. This decision was championed by Durai Vaiko, son of MDMK founder Vaiko, who made his political debut in this election.

Durai Vaiko, MDMK's principal secretary, contested from the Tiruchirappalli (Tiruchi) constituency.

The party initially sought to reclaim its traditional "Top" symbol, but the Election Commission of India refused because the party was contesting only one seat and lacked recognition as a state party.

After a legal challenge in the Madras High Court, the Election Commission of India allotted the "Matchbox" symbol to the MDMK for the 2024 polls.

Durai Vaiko won the Tiruchirappalli seat by a significant margin of 3,13,094 votes. He secured a total of 5,42,213 votes, defeating his closest rival, P. Karuppaiah of the AIADMK. By securing 5.42 lakh votes in Trichy, Durai Vaiko defeated.

=== 2026 Tamil Nadu Legislative Assembly election ===
Ahead of the 2026 Tamil Nadu Legislative Assembly election, a meeting was held between M. K. Stalin, president of the Dravida Munnetra Kazhagam (DMK) and Chief Minister of Tamil Nadu, and Vaiko, general secretary of the Marumalarchi Dravida Munnetra Kazhagam (MDMK), to discuss seat-sharing arrangements.

Following the discussions, it was announced that the MDMK, a constituent of the Secular Progressive Alliance, would contest four constituencies in the election. Of these, the party will contest three constituencies using the DMK’s “Rising Sun” symbol and one constituency using the MDMK’s party symbol.

Constituencies allotted were as follows:

- Modakkurichi (100) – Senthilnathan
- Sirkazhi (160) – Senthil Selvan (Won)
- Madurai South (192) – M. Boominathan
- Kadayanallur (221) – T. M. Rajendran (Won)

On 1 April 2026, Within the DMK-led alliance, the MDMK would contest all four constituencies allotted to it using the Rising Sun symbol. Although it had previously been indicated that the party would use a separate symbol in the Sirkazhi constituency.

Vaiko later announced that MDMK candidates would instead contest under the Rising Sun symbol there as well, bringing the total number of constituencies using the DMK symbol in the alliance to 176.

Two out of four contested won their seats.

== Party flag and symbol ==
Initial Symbol (1994): The MDMK initially contested elections on the "Umbrella" symbol.

The MDMK lost its status as a recognized state party in 2010 due to insufficient vote shares in previous elections. This led to the loss of the "Top" as its reserved symbol.

In the 2024 Lok Sabha elections, the party tried to reclaim the "Top" via the Madras High Court, but the Election Commission of India refused because the party contested only a single seat. They ultimately used the "Matchbox" symbol for the campaign. The election symbol is a match box. The colour of the party flag's top and bottom panel is red and middle panel is black. The party has a weekly journal called Sangoli which carries news and write ups for party workers. In 2024 Parliament Election, the ECI allotted Matchbox with stick symbol for contesting in Trichy.

== Lok Sabha ==
=== Election Performance ===
Lok Sabha Elections
Year	Lok Sabha	Seats contested	Seats won	(+/-) in seats	% of votes	Vote swing	Popular vote
1996	11th	24	0 / 39 (0%)	New entry	4.50%	New entry	12,22,415
1998	12th	5	3 / 39 (8%)	▲3	6.26%	▲1.76	16,02,504
1999	13th	5	4 / 39 (10%)	▲1	5.95%	▼0.31	16,20,527
2004	14th	4	4 / 39 (10%)	Steady	5.95%	Steady	16,79,870
2009	15th	4	1 / 39 (3%)	▼3	3.66%	▼2.29	11,12,908
2014	16th	7	0 / 39 (0%)	▼1	3.54%	▼0.12	14,17,535
2019	17th	1	1 / 39 (3%)	▲1	1.30%	▼2.24	5,63,591
2024	18th	1	1 / 39 (3%)	Steady	1.28%	▼0.02	5,42,213

=== List of Lok Sabha Members ===
Year	Election	Member	Constituency	Remarks				
Year	Election	Member	Constituency	Remarks	1998	12th Lok Sabha	Gingee N. Ramachandran	Tindivanam
A. Ganeshamurthi	Palani				1998	12th Lok Sabha		
Vaiko	Sivakasi				1998	12th Lok Sabha		
1999	13th Lok Sabha	Gingee N. Ramachandran	Tindivanam	Re-elected for 2nd term				
1999	13th Lok Sabha	M. Kannappan	Tiruchengode					
1999	13th Lok Sabha	C. Krishnan	Pollachi (SC)					
1999	13th Lok Sabha	Vaiko	Sivakasi	Re-elected for 2nd term				
2004	14th Lok Sabha	Gingee N. Ramachandran	Vandavasi	Re-elected for 3rd term				
2004	14th Lok Sabha	C. Krishnan	Pollachi (SC)	Re-elected for 2nd term				
2004	14th Lok Sabha	L. Ganesan	Tiruchirappalli					
2004	14th Lok Sabha	A. Ravichandran	Sivakasi					
2009	15th Lok Sabha	A. Ganeshamurthi	Erode	Re-elected for 2nd term				
2019	17th Lok Sabha	A. Ganeshamurthi	Erode	Re-elected for 3rd term Contested on DMK symbol				
2024	18th Lok Sabha	Durai Vaiko	Tiruchirappalli					

=== List of Rajya Sabha Members ===
Name	Position	Party	Constituency	From	To	Tenure
Vaiko	Member of Parliament, Rajya Sabha (4th Term)	MDMK	Tamil Nadu	25 July 2019	24 July 2025	5 years, 364 days

== Tamil Nadu Legislative Assembly Election ==
=== Election Performance ===
Year	Assembly	Seats contested	Seats won	(+/-) in seats	% of votes	Vote swing	Popular vote	Alliance	Outcome
1996	11th	177	0 / 234	New entry	5.78%	New entry	15,69,168	MDMK+	Lost
2001	12th	211	0 / 234	Steady	4.65%	▼1.13	13,04,469	MDMK+	Lost
2006	13th	35	6 / 234	▲6	5.98%	▲1.33	19,71,565	AIADMK+	Opposition
2011	14th	Boycotted Election							
2016	15th	29	0 / 234	▼6	0.86%	▼5.12	3,73,606	MNK	Lost
2021	16th	6 (Note: Since MDMK contested the election using the DMK symbol, the Election Commission officially recorded those candidates as DMK candidates. However, the vote share and seat share attributed to MDMK are calculated based on the constituencies where MDMK members were fielded under the DMK symbol.)	4 / 234	▲4	1.05%	▲0.19	4,86,979	SPA	Government
2026	17th	4	2 / 234	▼2	0.51%	▼0.54	2,50,403	SPA	Opposition

=== List of MLAs elected ===
Year	Assembly	Constituency	MLA Name	Remarks				
Year	Assembly	Constituency	MLA Name	Remarks	2006	13th	Vasudevanallur (SC)	T. Sadhan Tirumalaikumar
Sivakasi	R. Gnanadoss				2006	13th		
Thirumangalam	Veera Elavarasan				2006	13th		
Thondamuthur	M. Kannappan				2006	13th		
Virudhunagar	R. Varadarajan				2006	13th		
Cumbum	N. Eramakrishnan				2006	13th		
2021	16th	Ariyalur	K. Chinnappa	Contested on DMK symbol				
2021	16th	Madurai South	M. Boominathan	Contested on DMK symbol				
2021	16th	Sattur	A. R. R. Raghuraman	Contested on DMK symbol				
2021	16th	Vasudevanallur	T. Sadhan Tirumalaikumar	Contested on DMK symbol				
2026	17th	Sirkazhi	R. Senthilselvan	Contested on DMK symbol				
2026	17th	Kadayanallur	T. M. Rajendran	Contested on DMK symbol				

== List of Union Ministers ==
No.	Portrait	Portfolio	Name (Birth–Death)	Term in office			Constituency (House)	Prime Minister
No.	Portrait	Portfolio	Name (Birth–Death)	Assumed office	Left office	Time in office	Constituency (House)	Prime Minister
1		Minister of Non-Conventional Energy Sources [MoS(I/C)]	M. Kannappan (–)	13 October 1999	30 December 2003	4 years, 78 days	Tiruchengode (Lok Sabha)	Atal Bihari Vajpayee
2		Minister of Textiles [MoS]	Gingee N. Ramachandran (born 1944)	13 October 1999	30 September 2000	353 days	Tindivanam (Lok Sabha)	Atal Bihari Vajpayee
2		Minister of Finance [MoS]	Gingee N. Ramachandran (born 1944)	30 September 2000	1 July 2002	1 year, 274 days	Tindivanam (Lok Sabha)	Atal Bihari Vajpayee
2		Minister of Finance & Company Affairs [MoS]	Gingee N. Ramachandran (born 1944)	1 July 2002	24 May 2003	326 days	Tindivanam (Lok Sabha)	Atal Bihari Vajpayee
2		Minister of Textiles [MoS]	Gingee N. Ramachandran (born 1944)	8 September 2003	30 December 2003	113 days	Tindivanam (Lok Sabha)	Atal Bihari Vajpayee

== See also ==
- List of political parties in India
