= Prasanna Venkatachalapathy Temple, Tallakulam =

Vaishnavite temple in Madurai

Prasanna Venkatachalapathy temple, Tallakulam

Religion
- Affiliation: Hinduism
- District: Madurai

Location
- Location: Tallakulam
- State: Tamil Nadu
- Country: India
- Interactive map of Prasanna Venkatachalapathy temple, Tallakulam
- Coordinates: 9°56′02.7″N 78°08′09.2″E
- Elevation: 161 m (528 ft)

Arulmigu Prasanna Venkatachalapathy temple, Tallakulam is a Vaishnavite temple, constructed by King (Mannar) Thirumalai Naicker, dating back to 600 years ago. This temple is under purview of the administration of Kallalagar temple of Azhagar koil, of Madurai district. Goddesses here in this temple are 'Poodevi' and 'Sridevi'. Utsavar is named Srinivasar. This temple's Theertha is 'well water'. Hanuman is found to be in a posture of 'anger mode' and opposite to that is situated Chakkaraththaazhvaar.

== Location ==
Its geographical coordinates are 9.934086°N, 78.135885°E and its elevation above the mean sea level is 161 m.

== Neighbourhoods ==
People from the nearby places such as Madurai, Goripalayam, Sellur (Madurai), Narimedu, Anna Nagar, K. K. Nagar, Shenoy Nagar, Simmakkal, Madurai, Nelpettai, Yanaikkal, Madurai, B. B. Kulam, Chinnachokkikulam, visit this temple regularly.

== South facing main deity ==
The main deity is Prasanna Venkatachalapathy who faces towards Southern direction. Normally, in Vaishnavite temples, main deity faces Eastern direction.

== Temple history ==
During the reign of King (Mannar) Thirumalai Naicker, he was a devotee of Lord Vishnu (Shri Venkatachalapathy) in Tiruppathi. He used to have his breakfast after his morning Pooja. His morning Pooja was being done following the Pooja of Lord Venkatachalapathy in Tiruppathi. For that 'Bell mandaps' ('Manikatti Mandapangal' in Tamil) had been constructed by him at various places from Tiruppathi to Madurai. Once the Pooja at Tiruppathi started, the first bell in Tiruppathi was rung and thereafter the other bells following it. And on hearing the sound of the last bell in Madurai, King Thirumalai Naicker to finish his pooja and thereafter to have had his breakfast. On one day, there was no sign of ringing the bells. So he rushed to the spot of Bell mandap nearby his palace in Madurai. On his way, he felt an obstacle which was a statue of an 'anger mode' Anjaneya. He stopped for a while and found an immediate darshan (Prasanna) of Lord Venkatachalapathy there (now called Tallakulam). This made him very astonishing and pleased. So, he decided to build a temple for Lord Venkatachalapathy. So was the construction of it and named 'Arulmigu Prasanna Venkatachalapathy Temple.

== Important temple festivals ==
'Vaikunta Ekadasi', Chitra (Poornami) festival, 'Purattaasi' (Brahmotsav) festival, Tamil New Year, Pongal festival in the month of 'Thai' are some of the important festivals celebrated here in this temple.

== Temple timings ==
From 04.30 a.m. to 12 noon and from 04.30 p.m. to 08.30 p.m., the temple is kept open for public darshan.
