= List of tourist attractions in Coimbatore =

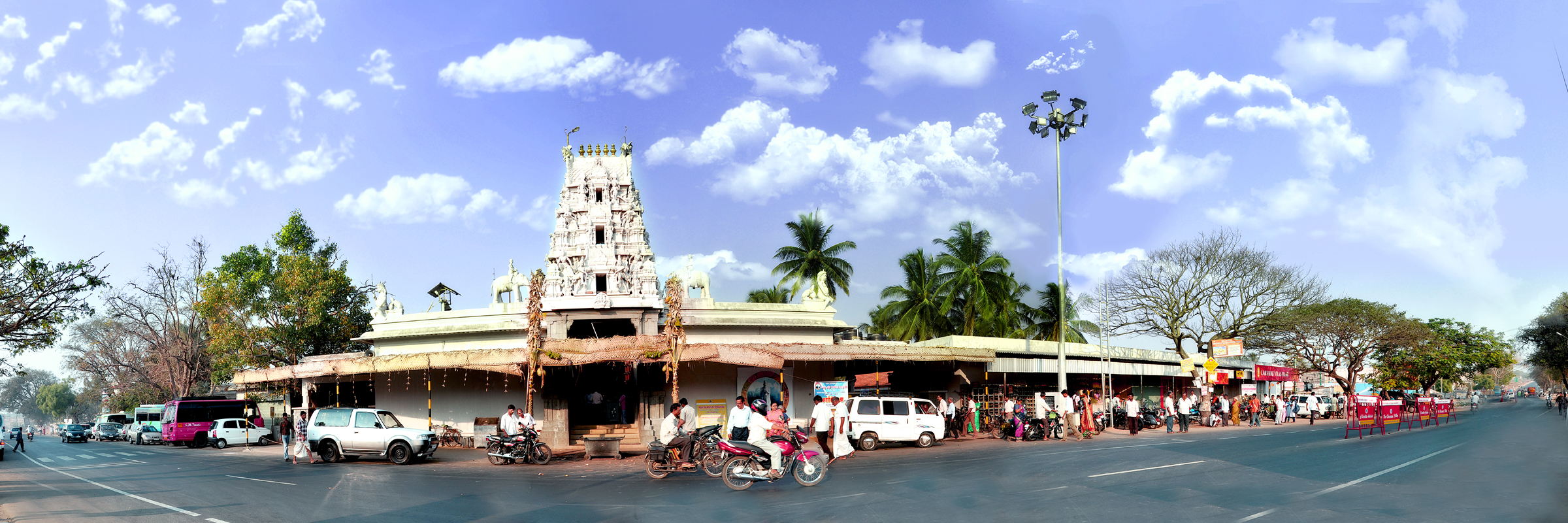
The Eachanari Vinayagar Temple is the key landmark and place of worship in Coimbatore

Coimbatore has many tourist attractions.

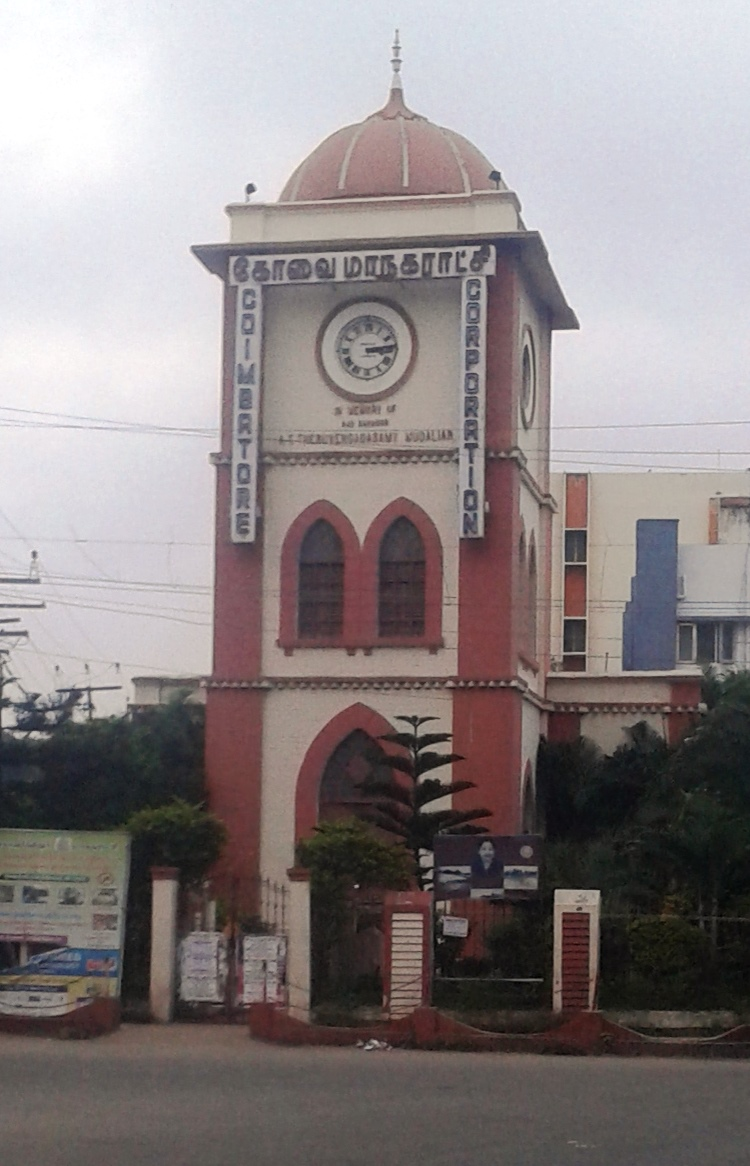
Clock tower installed in memory of A.T. Thiruvenkataswamy Mudaliar in 1877.

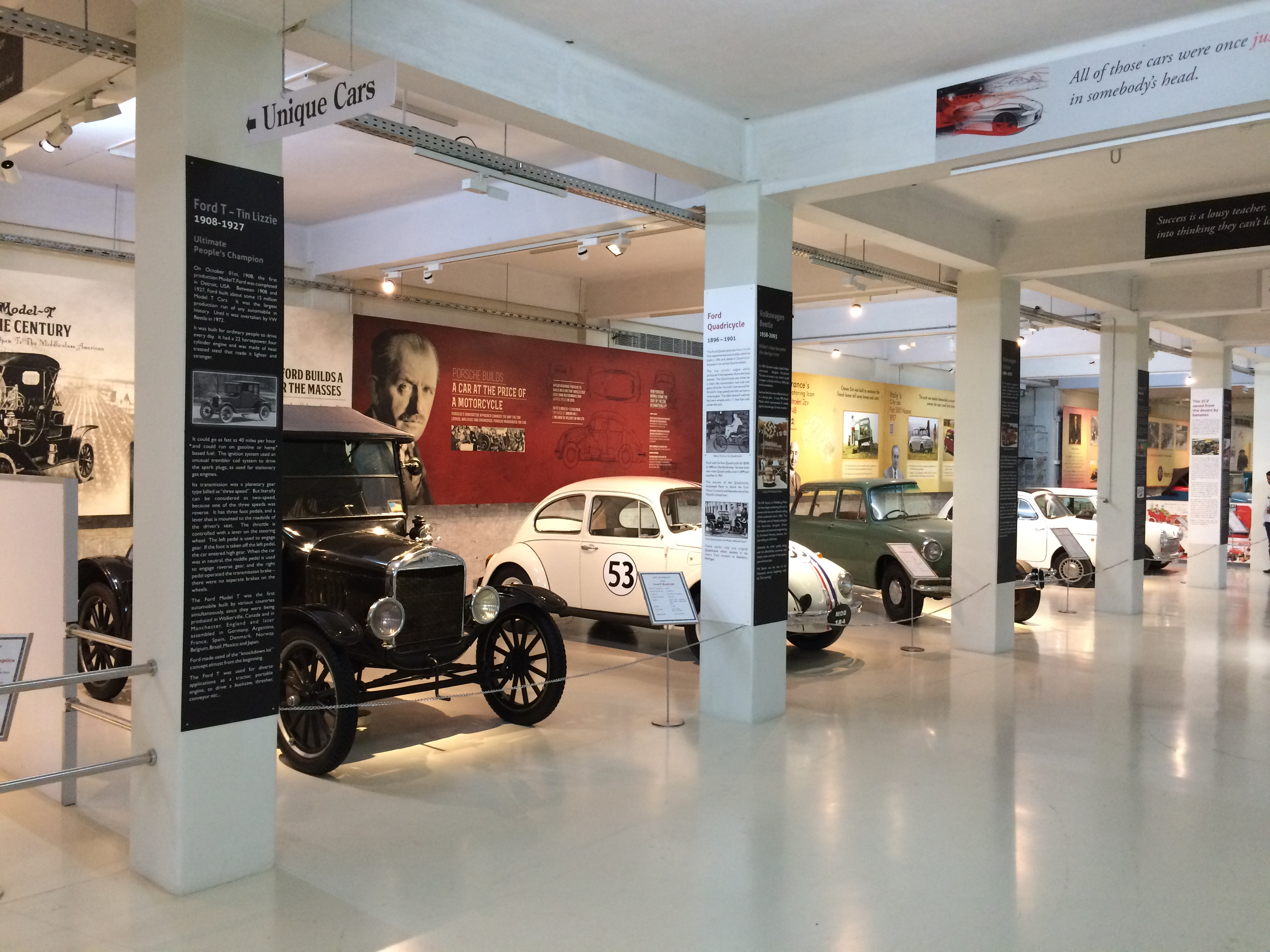
Gedee Car Museum, one of the first vintage and classic car museums in India

.

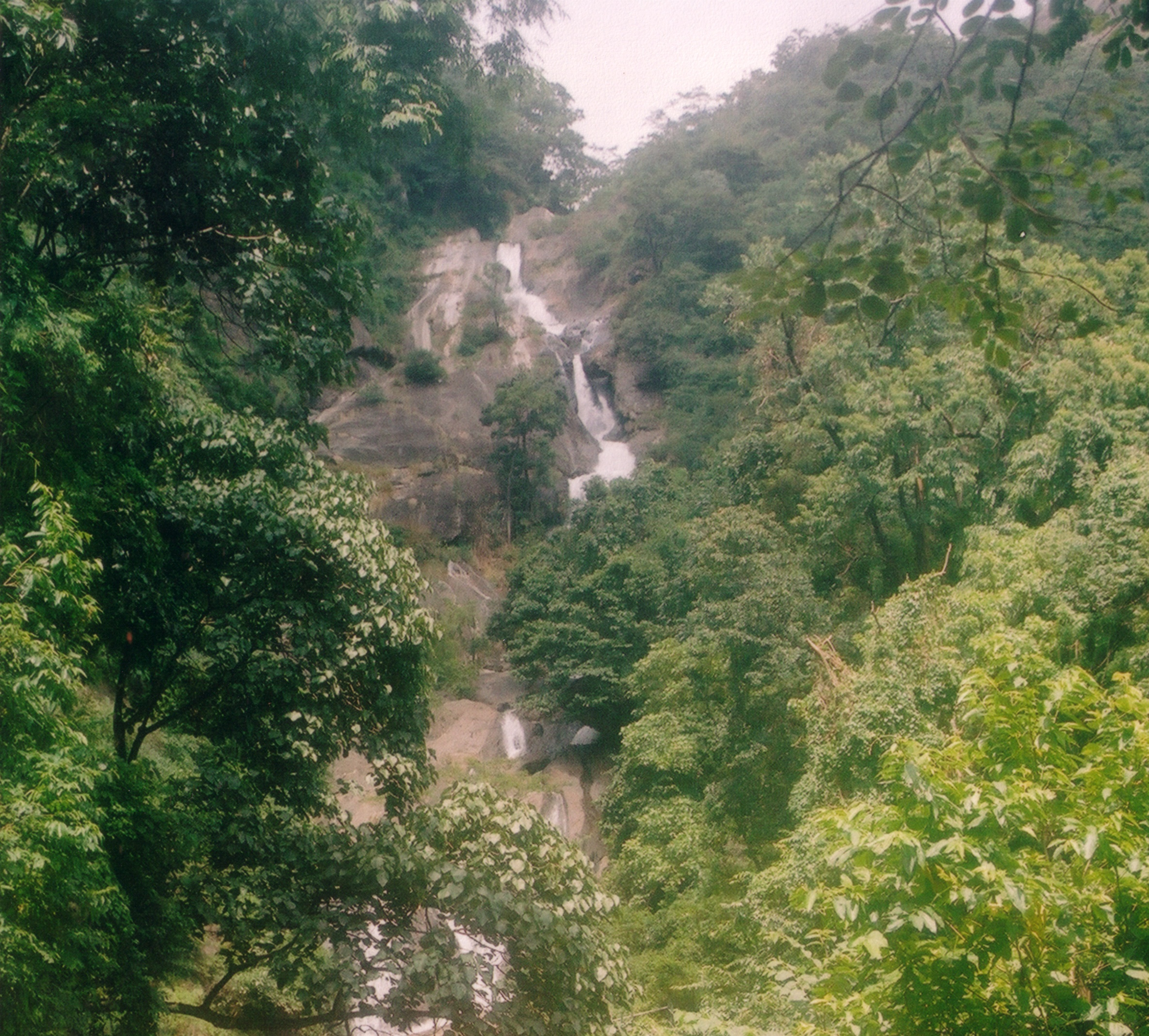
Siruvani Waterfalls

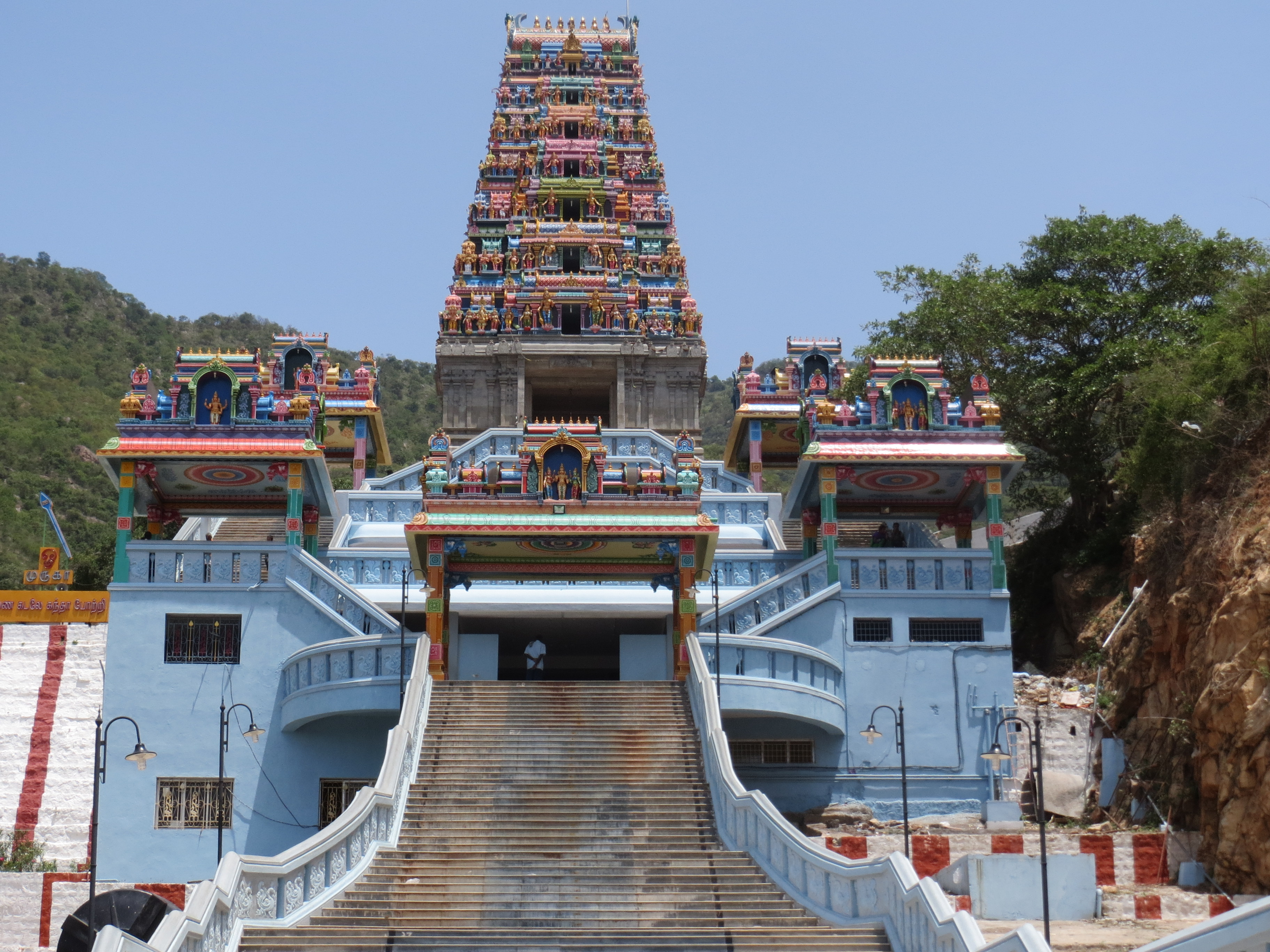
Marudamalai Murugan temple of the 12th century

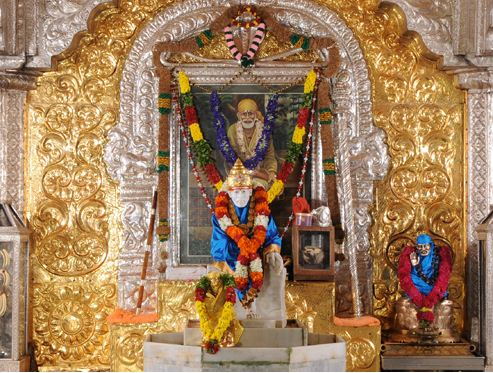
Sri Naga Sai at Sai Mandir in Mettupalayam Road

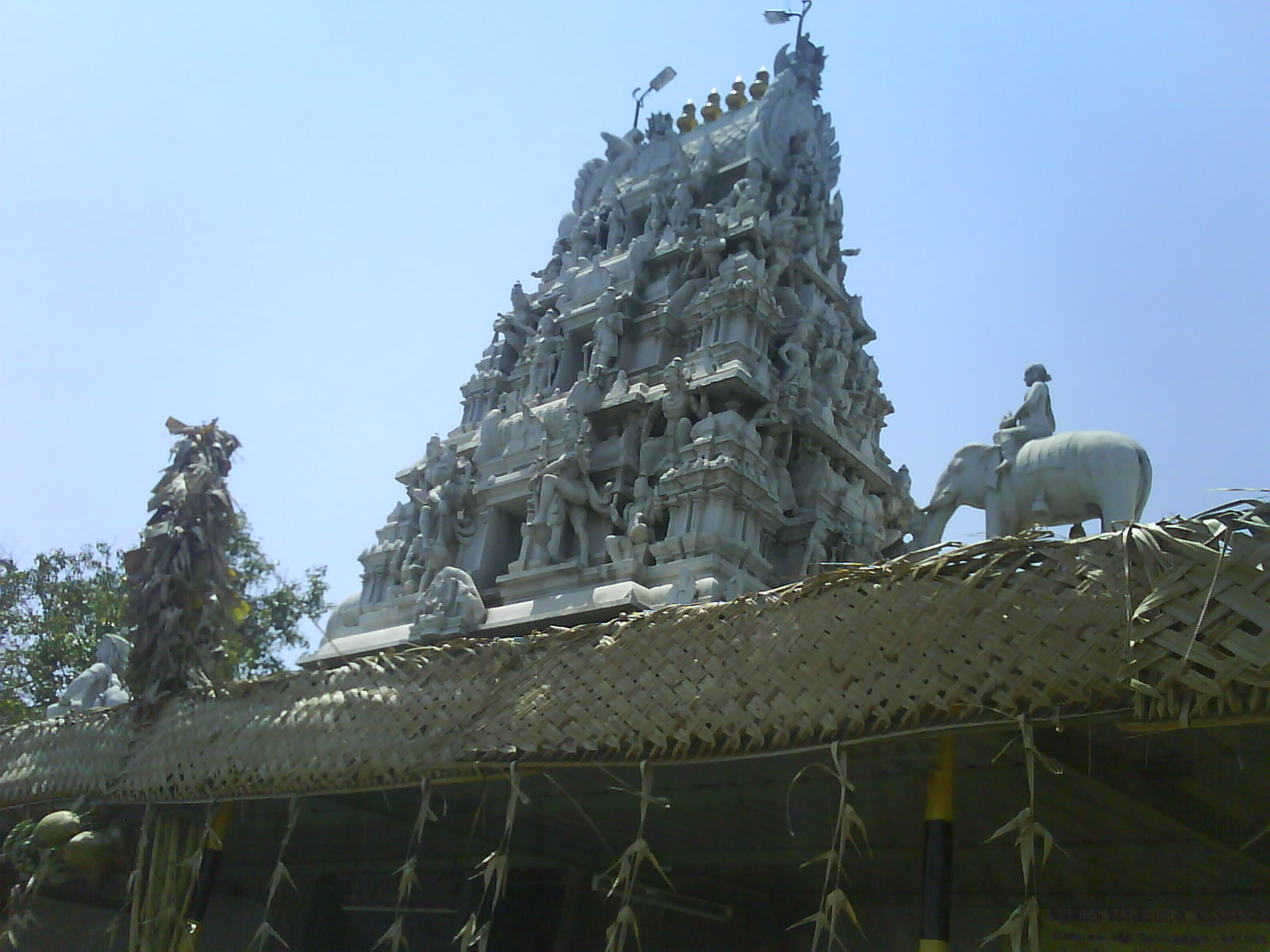
Eachanari Vinayagar Temple

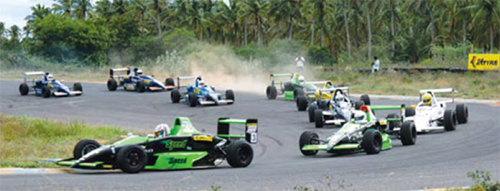
Kari Motor Speedway is India's second modern racing circuit

== Places of historical importance ==
- Vyasaraj Mutt - on Range Gowde street has a Hanuman installed by the seer Vyasaraja of the Vijayanagar Empire in the year 1511. Vyasaraja was an active proponent of Dwaita philosophy and was honoured by his protege King Krishnadevaraya. Vysaraja's stay in the Kongu region is believed to have led the Vijayanagar kings to build a fort in the city.
- Kottaimedu - Literally meaning "Fort mound", is a locality in Coimbatore. This is the location of the former Vijayanagar fort. The fort was destroyed and razed down in the battle Tipu's Armies led by Qamar ud-din defeated the British East India Company in the Siege of Coimbatore in the year 1791.
- Kottaimedu mosque - Built by Tipu Sultan.
- Podanur Junction - One of the first junctions in South India. Established in 1862. Also the place of Gandhi's speeches.
- Town Hall is a heritage building in Coimbatore city, built in 1882 in honor of Queen Victoria, with stone and lime mortar. It is now part of the Coimbatore Corporation Administrative Buildings.
- Coimbatore Central Prison - Freedom fighter V. O. Chidambaram Pillai (VOC) was jailed here between 1908 and 1910. He was under rigourus imprisonment and was yolked to an oil press. This earned him the name Chekkiluththa Chemmal (meaning the great one who pulled the Chekkil (oil press)). The prison has a marble statue of VOC and also preserves the Oil press he was yoked to.
- Delite Theatre (Variety Hall) - In the year 1914, cinema pioneer Samikannu Vincent established South India's first permanent cinema theatre called Variety Hall. The place is now called Delite theatre. Samikannu took his projector and introduced movies to places as far as Lahore, Peshawar, Burma and Afghanistan.
- PSG Sarvajana High School - Rabindranath Tagore visited the school in 1924 and sang the Jana Gana Mana.
- Plague Mariamman Temple - is a 150 year old temple located between Big Bazaar and Raja Streets. Local people believed that the goddess saved them from the plague in 1936. Earlier in 1903, 1909 and 1917, thousands of people had died due to deadly plague outbreak in the city.
- Bulganin Thottam - A farm in the north of Coimbatore visited by Russian leader Bulganin.

== Uniquely Coimbatore ==
The following are Geographical Indication tags associated with Coimbatore city.

- Kovai Cora Cotton sarees - Kovai Kora cotton is a blend of silk and cotton and Kora (found more in the Sirumugai area). The Devanga community are pioneers in weaving Kovai Kora cotton saris. 82 Weaver cooperative Societies in Coimbatore, Tiruppur and Erode are authorised to sell Kovai Kora cotton saris.
- Coimbatore Wet Grinder - The wet grinder owes its creation numerous entrepreneurs in the city.

== Heritage buildings ==
- Clock tower was tower installed at Town Hall in 1877, in memory of A.T. Thiruvenkataswamy Mudaliar.

== Parks ==
- The Botanical garden was established in 1925 and administered by Tamil Nadu Agricultural University (TNAU). The botanical garden is spread over 300 hectares and exhibits many varieties of plants.
- VOC Park & Zoo- a public and zoological garden located in center of the City.
- Gandhi Park - More than a hundred years old. The public park is spread over 5.25 acres, was renovated at the cost of Rs 3.2 crores. The park has gardens, 750m-long walking track, play area for children, fountains and a yoga center.

== Boat Houses ==
- Valankulam Lake Boat House - Ukkadam to Sungam Bypass Road
- Periyakulam Lake Boat House- Ukkadam
- Singanallur Lake Boat House [Not Operational]

== Nature and wildlife ==
- Noyyal River – The township of Coimbatore once was surrounded by the Noyyal River and its canals, tanks, and rivulets. The Noyyal River and its interconnected tank and canal system, believed to have been originally built by the Chalukya Cholas kings.
- Lakes in Coimbatore – Coimbatore's lakes include Valankulam Lake, Krishnampatti Lake, Singanallur Lake, Seevagasintamani Lake, Kuruchi Lake, Perur Lake, Sulur Lake, Ukkadam Periyakulam Lake and Muthannan Lake amongst others.
- Vaideki Falls is a waterfall situated in the outskirts of Coimbatore city about 35 km from Coimbatore.
- Sengupathi Falls is located 35 km (22 mi) from Coimbatore.
- Butterflies - 100 species of butterflies are seen around Coimbatore (complete list) and neighbouring areas. Some of the familiar species are Tamil yeoman, Tamil lacewing, Common banded peacock, Crimson rose and Indian sunbeam.

== Museums ==
- Government Museum showcases many artifacts.
- Ancient Industrial Artifacts Museum is located off Nanjundapuram road. Artifacts from the Old and New Stone Age are displayed. Prized collections include stone tools and gigantic burial urns from that era. The museum also houses antiquities excavated from Boluvampatti (copper bangles, stone beads), Vellalore and Perur (coins, jewellery and shell bangles). Another rare artifact is the stone slab inscription from Udumalpet that lists the rules and regulations to be followed as per the king's order.
- Gass Forest Museum – A museum for forestry established in 1902 by the then conservator of forests, Horace Arichibald Gass. It houses embalmed specimens of rare species of butterflies, birds, and mammals. One can see cultivation methods, model houses, armour of soldiers, and hunting equipment.
- Insect Museum - First of its kind museum in India with collections from as early as 1900. Part of the Agricultural University.
- G.D. Naidu Museum – It has a collection of various scientific devices and gadgets. It has a collection of inventions by Gopalswamy Doraiswamy Naidu, who is also referred as the Edison of India. T One can also see the history of industrialization in Coimbatore.
- Regional Science Center is a science park spread over 6.71 acres (near the road leading to CODISSIA Trade Fair Complex). It has a 5,000 sq ft textile gallery showcasing the textile industry's evolution, a 5,000 sq ft Fun Science Gallery, a 3D theatre for children, a giant globe and a portable mini planetarium.
- Kasthuri Sreenivasan Art Gallery & Textile museum – The facility houses an Art gallery, a Textile Museum, an auditorium and a library. It is located on Avinashi road.
- Tamilnadu Police Museum - Showcases State Police history and collection of arms and other artefacts. Opened in 2018.

== Places of worship ==
=== Temples ===
- Koniamman Temple
- Perur Pateeswarar Temple – An ancient temple on the outskirts of the city, said to have been visited by some of the Nayanmars
- Naga Sai Mandir
- Marudamalai Murugan Temple – A 12th century temple for Murugan or Subramanya, situated in the Marudamalai Hills about fifteen kilometers from Coimbatore.
- Eachanari Vinayagar Temple
- Virundeeswarar Temple in Vadamadurai near Thudiyalur-1300+ years old ancient Shiva temple.
- Mundhi Vinayagar Temple - Asia's largest Ganesh statue temple, is located at Periakulam.
- Ashtamsa Varadha Anjaneyar Temple
- Dharmalinga malai - Shiva temple
- Ranganathaswamy temple, Karamadai

=== Jain temples ===
- Sri Vimal Nath Jain Derasar located on Vysial street. This is the oldest Jain temple in Coimbatore.
- Suparshwanath Jain temple, is located on Range Gowdar street.
- Shankeshwar Parshvanath Bhagwan Jain temple, is located at R. S. Puram.
- Munisuvrat Swetamber Jain Temple, is located at Saibaba colony.

=== Mosques ===
- Kottaimedu mosque - Built by Tipu Sultan in 1776. The mosque was renovated in the year 1901. The Malabar Rebellion (1921) freedom fighters are buried in the mosque premises.
- Athar Jamad Masjid - An expansive 10,000 sq.ft. mosque which was completed in 1904 (construction started in 1860), under the supervision of 52 Athar (perfume) families who migrated from Tirunelveli. Built in Mughal and Italian architecture styles. Visited by Khrushchev during his 1955 visit to Coimbatore with Nehru. Towers are 85 feet high. Can seat 3000 during prayer.

=== Churches ===
- St. Anthony's church - built in 1859 by Fr.De Gelis, and later renovated in 1892. The church is located in Puliakulam.
- St. Michael's cathedral - consecrated in 1867 by Bishop Claude-Marie Dépommier. The church was demolished in 2013 and rebuilt again at a cost of 100 million rupees. It can now accommodate 2500 people compared to the earlier capacity of 200. The new church is known for its painting and stained glass work. It is located on Big Bazaar Street.
- CSI All Souls church - consecrated in 1872 and built at a cost of Rs. 20,000. The church is known for its intricate woodwork. It is an Anglican church in the Gothic style of architecture. It is located on Race course road.
- CSI Christ Church - dedicated in 1910, the church follows the traditional Anglican order of service. The church is located on Trichy road.

== Sports ==
- Kari Motor Speedway is a purpose built auto racing circuit or race track, located in Orratukuppai, Chettipalayam. The track's length is 3.2 km. It was inaugurated in 2003 in memory of former formula race driver S. Karivardha. it is Coimbatore's first and India's second modern racing circuit.
- Indian National Rally Championship - Coimbatore is an important leg of the National Rally Champtionshop. The Coimbatore leg is generally spread over 3 days.
- Nehru Stadium - football stadium and home to the I-league club Chennai City FC.
- Coimbatore Golf Club – This is an 18-hole golf course located in Chettipalayam in Coimbatore. It is a venue for major golf tournaments. The 6973-yard golf course has a par of 72.
- Kovai Hills Golf Academy is part of Kovai Hills, a 1000-acre fully integrated golf-centric township that also has an 18-hole par-72 championship golf course designed by David Hemstock. It is India's first golf academy with a 9-hole, par 3 golf course.
- Equestrian - Youth of the city interested in this sport. Some of the institutions are Equine dreams, United Royal riders, Remix Equestrian International.
- Lyca Kovai Kings - Cricket team representing Coimbatore in the Tamil Nadu Premier League (TNPL).
- Coimbatore Flying Club
- Coimbatore Cosmopolitan Club

== Amusement parks ==
- Black Thunder is a water theme park located in Mettupalayam, 40 km north of Coimbatore city. The park is spread over 65 acres and offers over 49 rides. It is located 40 km from downtown Coimbatore on the Ooty Road. The park is surrounded by the Nilgiris hills.
- Kovai Kondattam is an amusement park located at Siruvani main road, Kalampalyam.
- Maharaja Theme Park is a theme park with multiplex situated at Neelambur, NH47, Avinashi Road.

== Shopping malls ==
- Brookefields Mall
- Fun Republic Mall
- Prozone mall

== Around Coimbatore ==
- Sri Vana Badra Kali Amman Temple Mettupalayam
- Then Thirumalai, Mettupalayam
- Thirumurthyswami Temple
- Masani Amman Temple
- Adiyogi Shiva statue, unveiled by Narendra Modi on Maha Shivaratri, 2017.
- Velliangiri Andavar Temple
- Siruvani Waterfalls and dam are located 49 km from Coimbatore city. The dam was built in 1927. The reservoir at Siruvani was built for Tamil Nadu by the Kerala Government to meet the drinking water requirements of Coimbatore city.
- Anamalai National Park is a protected area located in the Anaimalai Hills of Pollachi, Valparai and Udumalpet taluks of Coimbatore District and Tirupur District. The park and the sanctuary are under consideration by UNESCO as part of the Western Ghats World Heritage Site. It has numerous species of animals (including 5 endangered species), 250 species of birds and 315 species of butterflies.
- Silent Valley National Park is located about 60 km from Coimbatore. It represents one of the last patches of undisturbed rain forest in India.
- Baralikkadu is located about 70 km from Coimbatore.

== See also ==
- Tourism in Tamil Nadu
