= Ungampalayam =

- Village
- Nickname: Noyyal oor
- Location in Tamil Nadu, India Ungampalayam (India)
- Coordinates: 11°2′N 77°50′E
- Country: India
- State: Tamil Nadu
- Region: Kongu Nadu(West Tamil Nadu)
- District: Karur District
- Village Panchayat: 1700
- Talukas: K.Paramati

Population (2011)
  - Total: 210

Languages
  - Official: Tamil
- Time zone: UTC+5:30 (IST)
- PIN: 638151
- Telephone code: 91 (4204)
- Literacy: 40%
- Lok Sabha constituency: Karur
- Vidhan Sabha constituency: Aravakuruchi
- Distance from Chennai: 436 kilometres (271 mi) NE (rail)
- Distance from Bangalore: 366 kilometres (227 mi) N (land)
- Climate: Tropical climate (Köppen)
- Precipitation: 1,050 millimetres (41 in)
- Avg. annual temperature: 28 °C (82 °F)
- Avg. summer temperature: 34.3 °C (93.7 °F)
- Avg. winter temperature: 24 °C (75 °F)

Ungampalayam is a village in the South Indian state of Tamil Nadu.

== Location ==
The village is located in the Tamil Nadu, Karur District, Karur Paramathi Block, Thurkatchi Panchayat. It is located 46 km from Erode, 30 km from Karur, 9 km from Kodumudi and 16 km from Muthur. The village is on the banks of Noyyal River.

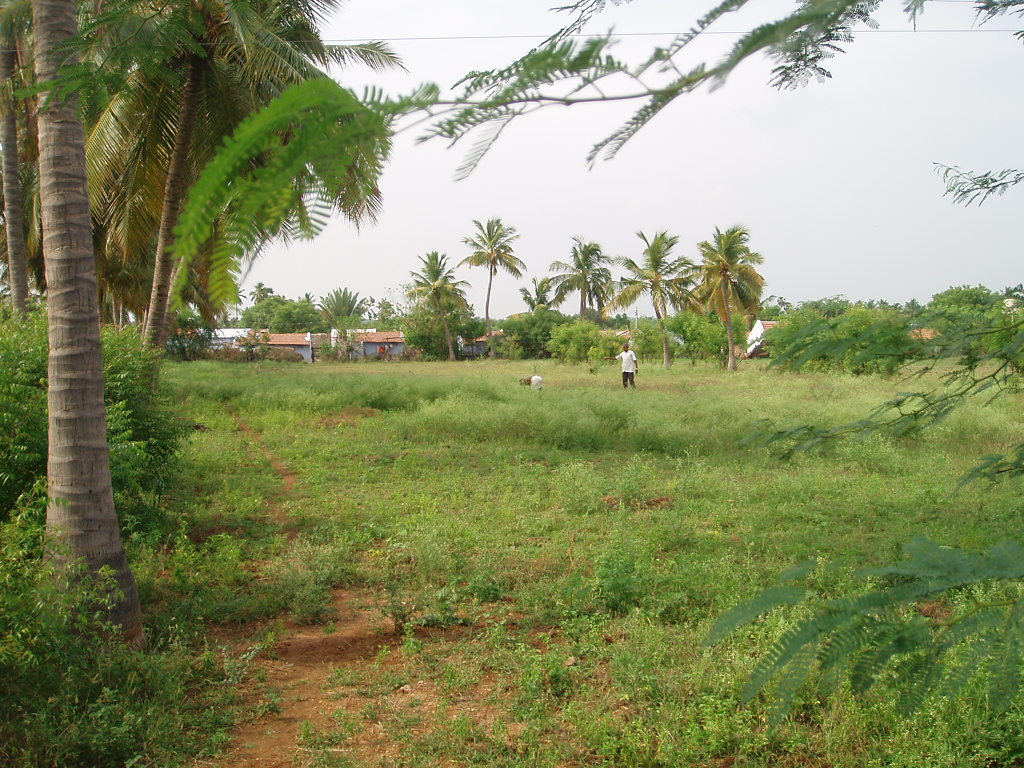
Ungampalayam

The village is named after Ungaan – Stone Carver (Ottan), who had been living there before people move from Varatu Karai near the Village.

== History ==
The Kongu vellalars migrated from the lush, fertile Cauvery delta in Tanjore and Trichy to the wild forests upriver Cauvery. The Chola kingdom which flourished from the 9th to the 13th centuries, needed to expand its land for cultivation.

The delta becomes crowded forcing enterprising people to expand to forest and built villages. They move up river and by their sheer hard work and persistence had survived and created villages in the Kongu region, and they are called Kongu Vellalars ("Farmers of Kongu").

The expansion stated in near 10th century continued as the families and clan expands till 700 years later. In 1700s Maniyan clan people from Mohanur, Namakkal Dist (With deity of Chellandi amman and Navaladi Karuppusamy) in need of resources migrated again from there. They travelled along the River Cauvery and reached River Noyyal, which is Cauvery's tributary.

They got settled near Noyyal River around Thurkatchi – "Reign of Goddess Durga" (Wrongly spelt as Thukkatchi, "Reign of Worry"). They constructed clan deity in Kattampatti for Chellandi amman and Sekkadi Periyasamy. The deity Sekkadi Periyasamy has been installed by a Vaaniyar (Oil miller) sage, so called Sekkadi (Oil pressing place).

These people are called as a new section of Maniyans as Thurkatchi (Thukkatchi) Maniyan Kootam, having clan temple in Kattampatti (2 km). They belong to third section of Maniyan kootam, apart from Mohanur Maniyan and Muthur Maniyan.

== The village ==
The village has deity of Bhagavathi amman and Kuppayi amman for prosperity and protection. The village once spotted with river shore of sand and Neem forest with a fresh fish and clean river. Now it has become sorrow and dumping ground of Industrial effluent and sewages.

The village now accommodates approximately 50 families. People now started living near the farm, building houses there. East side of the village people of unprivileged live in Ungampalayam Muralai. The village is on the south banks of Noyyal river, thus fall under Karur District (Noyyal river is the border).

The village has close relationship with villages around there like Kattur, Karungalkadu, Thukachi, Kattampatti, NariKattuValasu, Puthupalayam, Pillapalayam, Ramanathapuram, Anjur, Valayapalayam, ChinnaValayaPalayam, NallaSelliPalayam, Murgampalayam to mention a few surrounding villages. Bore well water from Pillapalyam is supplied to Ungampalayam, for folks livelihoods.

== Irrigation ==
The agriculture activities are carried out with water from canal from a small dam on the Noyyal river in Karvazhi Village (5 km) called Aathupalayam Dam, which will supply water for 3–5 months. After that people should depend on the Well for the agriculture. About half the year the water scarcity is there. From 2005 to 2008, drought-like conditions existed due to rain scarcity; crop and coconut trees dried away, and most of them died.

Due to the release of stored effluent from the Orathuppalayam Dam, Tirupur District even the small fresh water available from a seasonal river are not stored in the Aathupalayam dam.

== Ecological deterioration ==
The sewages of Coimbatore and Tirupur and industrial effluent from dyeing factories and textile processing plant of Triupur and Coimbatore changed the ecology of the river.

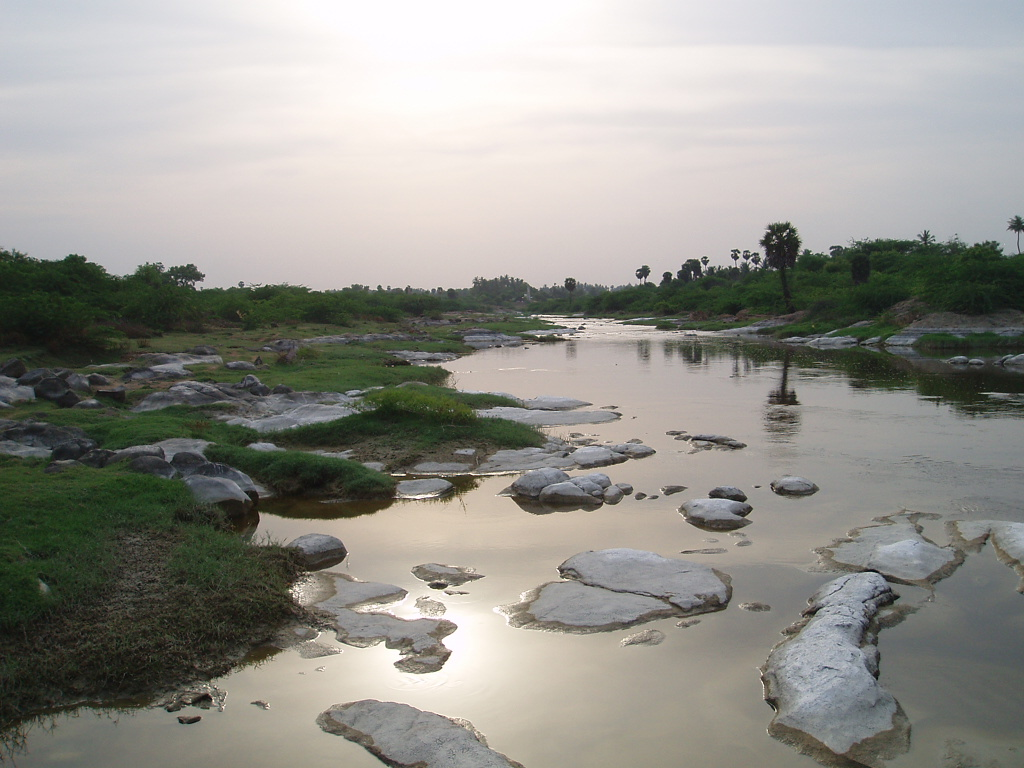
River Noyyal

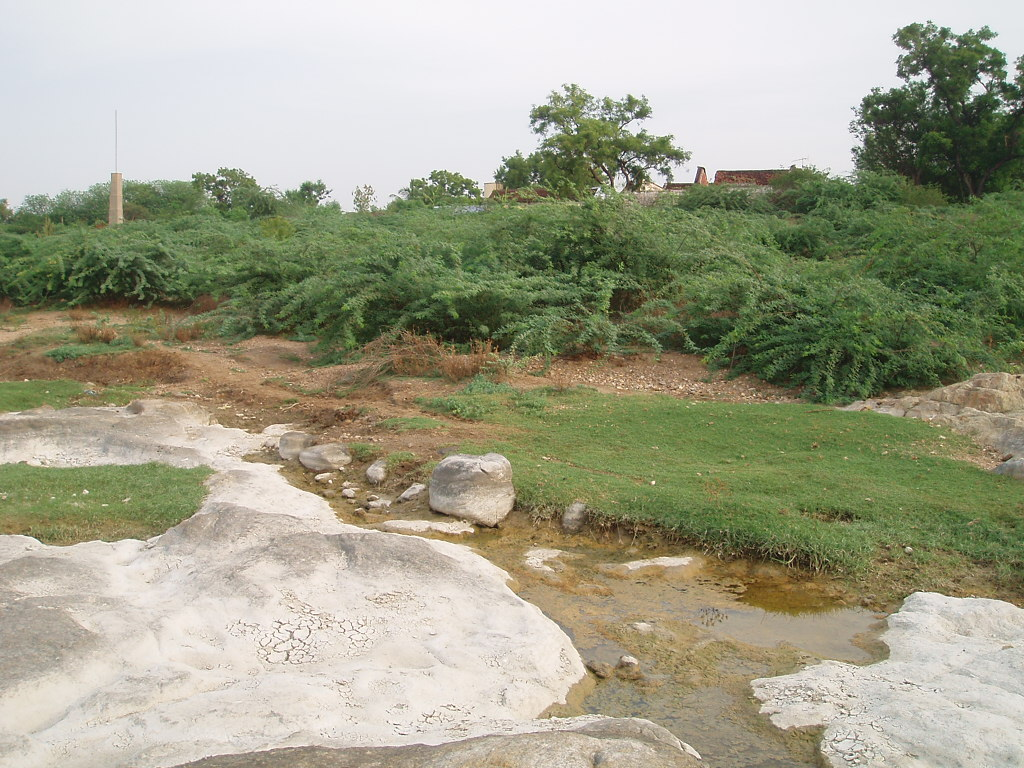
Seemai Karuvel

The river water now running mostly as coloured and even cattle are not to be let drink the water, if came to contact with skin it causes inflammation and allergies to humans.

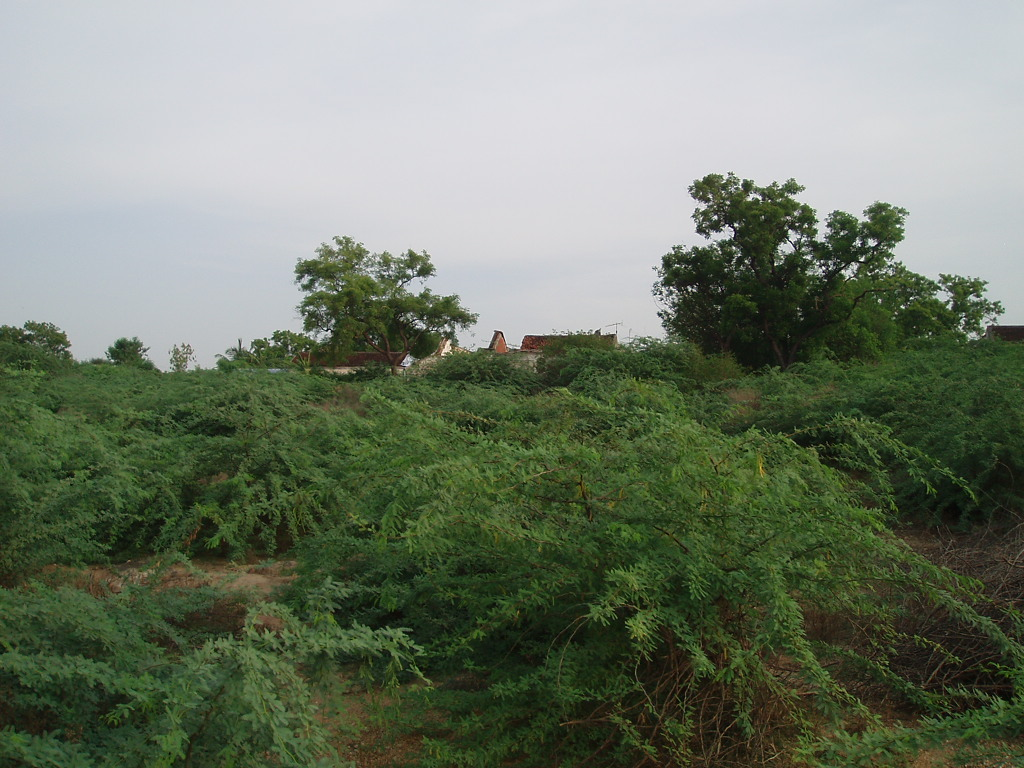
Thorn Infested

People have to depend on the Cauvery water line for drinking and utility water. Before the 1990s people used to swim and this used to be fertile and lush area then.

Now the river is a large sewage and banks are full of the Prosopis juliflora (seemai karuvel, vilayati babul), an invasive thorn bush. The village doesn't command a Tar road and transport is headache to the people living there.

== Livelihood deterioration ==
Begin surrounded by districts of Tirupur, Erode where the road and electricity facilities are well developed, this K.Paramathi block of Karur district look as undernourished desert. Even the bridges built on Noyyal in Anjur (5 km) or Kattampatti (2.5 km) or Thukachi (1 km) are done by people of the village, with a minor contribution from the government.

So with no proper livelihood educated people move to towns, farmers shift to nearby villages with better transport. And young people are moving to Finance business in Kerala and Karnataka. As an irony people go to work in Tirupur, which is the source of the deterioration. From land holding Farmers to Wage workers in mills of Tirupur, thus feeding the market of cheap labor.

On the southwest side a new quarry is started in 2007 called SVBM. These people has created some 2–3 km tar road for their use, there by beneficial to people. There are still problem of the dust sweeping through houses and lands of the villagers due to the quarry.

== Noyyal tears ==
According to the state Pollution Control Board the accumulated pollution loads between 1980 and 2000 are as follows:

Total Dissolved Substances (TDS)	23.54 lakh tonnes
Chlorides	13.11 lakh tones
Sulphates	1.25 lakh tones
Total Solid Substances (TSS)	0.97 lakh tonnes
Chemical Oxygen Demand (COD)	0.90 lakh tones
Biochemical Oxygen Demand (BOD)	0.29 lakh tones
Oil & Grease	0.01 lakh tonnes

A study, called 'Biological Monitoring of Genotoxic Hazards Related to Textile Dyeing Industries,' by the PSG College of Arts and Science in Coimbatore, showed that tadpoles in Noyyal had significant DNA damage and that fish organs were highly contaminated. Groundwater samples they collected revealed amines, which are capable of inducing DNA strand breaks in humans. Another report from the University of Madras (Chennai) notes that the Noyyal is dead, because of inflow of industrial effluents.

A report by the Linkoping University in Sweden notes that till the mid-90s, "Approximately 90 million litres of water was used and discharged from the dyeing and bleaching industry in Tirupur. Virtually all of this was let out without treatment." While common effluent treatment plants have been set up since – treating only a fraction of the 100,000 million litres daily – the damage has been done.

== See also ==
- List of reservoirs and dams in India
- Kodumanal
- Noyyal River
- Orathuppalayam Dam
- Aathupalayam Dam
- Maniyan kootam
