= Siruthuli =

NGO working to rejuvenate water sources in the city of Coimbatore, India

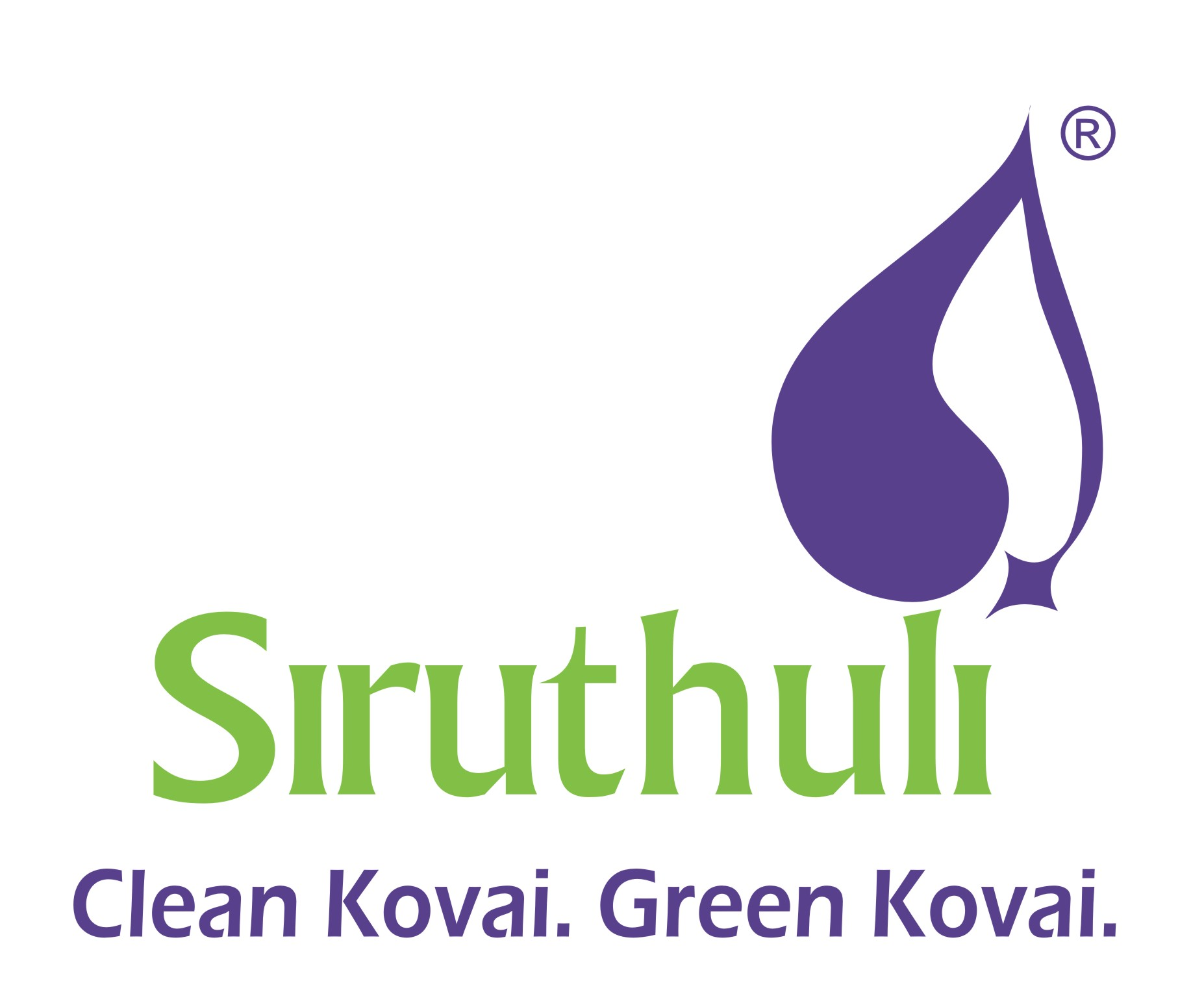
- Type: NGO
- Website: siruthuli.com

Siruthuli is an NGO based in Coimbatore, India which works to rejuvenate the water sources in the city of Coimbatore. Siruthuli means a small drop in Tamil.

== Stated objectives ==
- Reviving the heritage of Coimbatore vis-à-vis its traditional water management system
- Rainwater harvesting to harness rainwater and de-silt ponds, canals and waterways in disuse to raise the ground water level
- Preventing environmental degradation by launching a drive against non-bio degradable wastes
- Mass education programmes to provide awareness to the larger community to protect the environment
- Institutionalizing waste water management and thereby improving sanitation facilities in the community
- Initiating projects for a cleaner and greener environment, like Afforestation drive
- To foster inter-community relationship through a wider participation by the community to build up a strong social solidarity
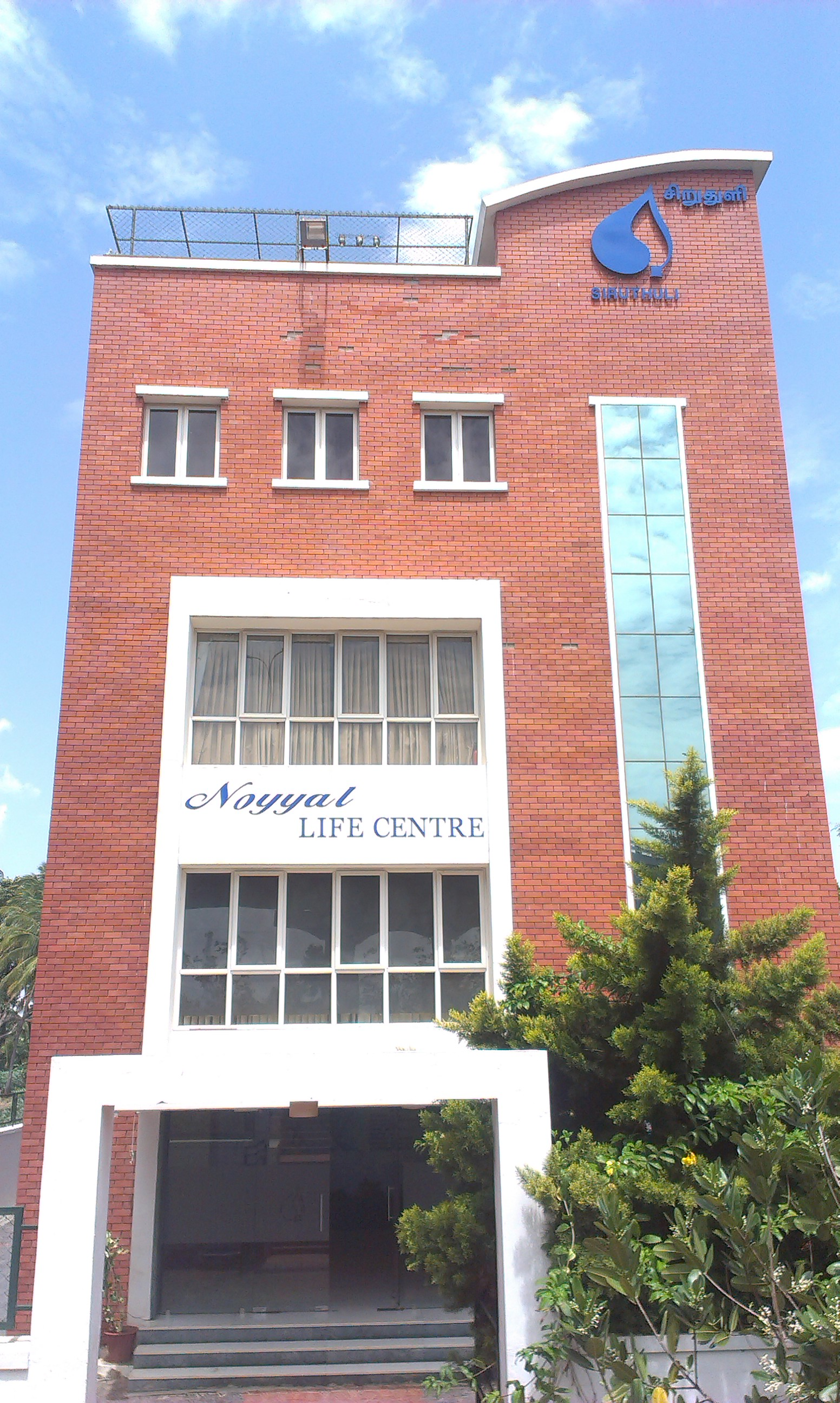
  Headquarter of the non-profit Siruthuli in South Coimbatore near Sungam By-pass flyover.

== Activities ==
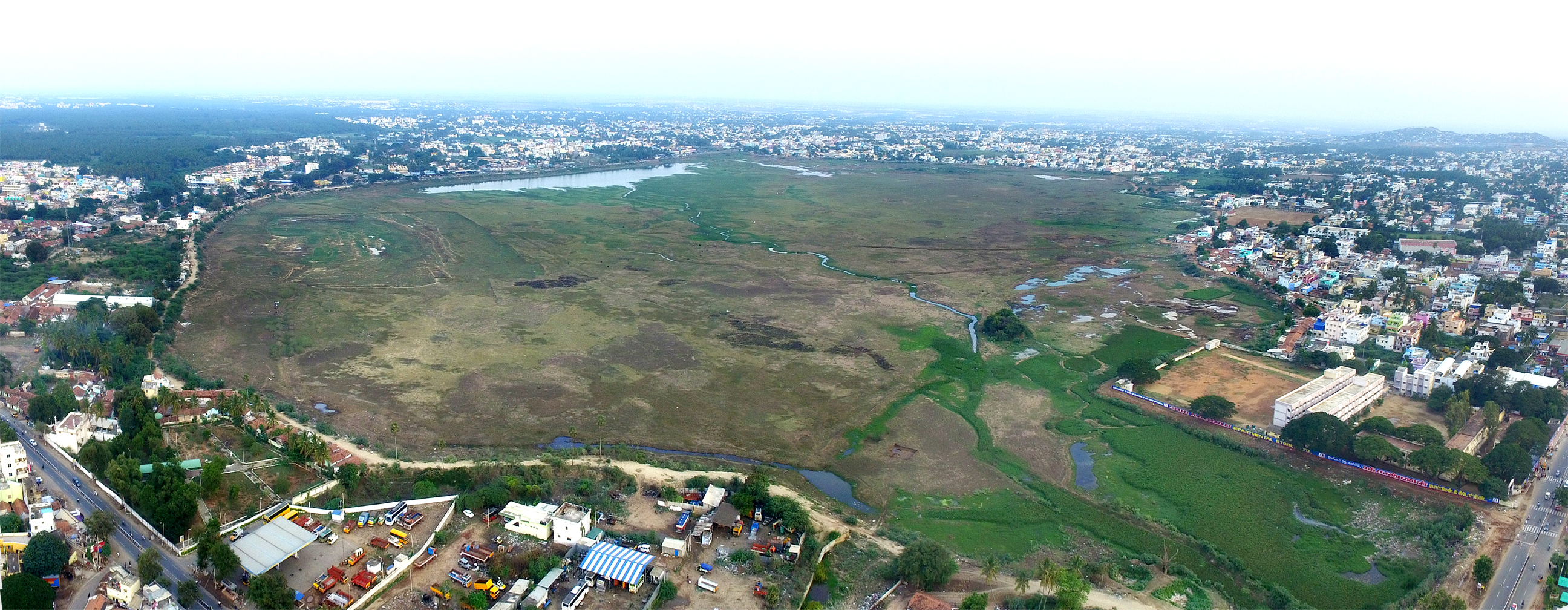
Panorama view of Kuruchi lake from kuniyamuthur side

- Lakes in and around Coimbatore namely, Krishnampathy, Narasampathy, Selvampathy, Kumarasamy, Kurichi Kulam and Periyakulam were desilted and deepened. A Checkdam was also built with help of government funding.
- With the help of the Coimbatore Municipal Corporation, 150 borewells with recharge pits and filter chambers were constructed to harvest the rainwater from roads and the open spaces.
- Water hyacinth was removed from Valankulam tank. Siruthuli will take up processing of 100 MT. of organic market waste daily.
- It also plans to plant and nurture 1000 trees and remove encroachments in Noyyal River.

== Awards ==
- Amruthavarshini Award from Rotary club of Coimbatore - 2015
- Bhoomijal Samwardhan Puraskar - 2008 (Ground water Augmentation Award), by Union Ministry of Water Resources
