= Orathuppalayam Dam =

Dam in Tamil Nadu, India

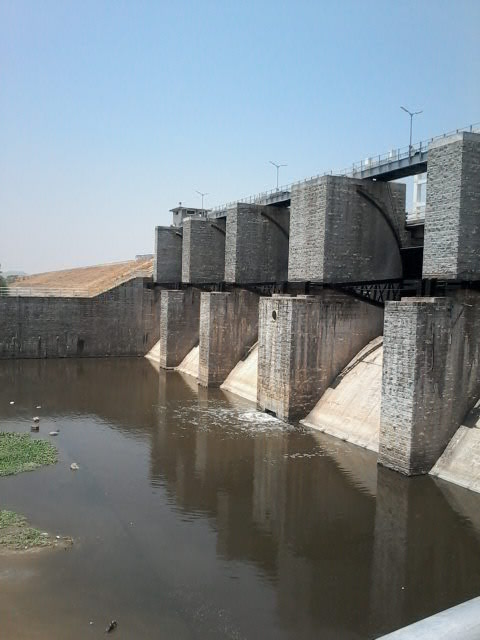

- Location within Tamil Nadu
- Official name: Noyyal Orathuppalayam
- Country: India
- Location: Kangayam, Tirupur District.
- Coordinates: 11°06′31″N 77°32′23″E
- Status: Decommissioned
- Opening date: 1992

Dam and spillways
- Type of dam: Embankment with gravity section
- Impounds: Noyyal River
- Height: 21.7 m (71 ft)
- Length: 2,290 m (7,510 ft)
- Spillway capacity: 2,527 m^{3}/s (89,200 cu ft/s)

Reservoir
- Total capacity: 17,480 m^{3} (14.17 acre⋅ft)
- Surface area: 2.2 km^{2} (0.85 mi^{2})

The Noyyal Orathuppalayam Dam and Reservoir, also called Orathuppalayam Dam, is located on the Noyyal River between Chennimalai and Kangayam in Tirupur District, Tamil Nadu, South India. The dam is situated 16 km (9.9 mi) north of Kangayam and 26 km (16 mi) east of Tirupur.

The dam was built in 1992. It has an ayacut of over 10,000 acres in Tirupur and Karur Districts. It was used by the farmers only for five years as it became a storage tank for textile effluents after that. The farmers, who depended on the dam and river for irrigation, stopped the farm activity in their land.

Due to the sad conversion of Irrigation dam to Effluent tank, the people living down river in the Tirupur, Karur District are negatively affected. From 1992 the deterioration has started and caused migration. Ungampalayam in the K.Paramathi block, Karur district is one such example.

Even the villages near the dam in Chennimalai, Uttukuli area are affected. Kodumanal, famous archaeological site containing Roman coins, potteries and megalithic tombs is severely affected by effluent.

The dam is a major concern for environmentalists because of its polluted waters.

== See also ==
- List of reservoirs and dams in India
- Kodumanal
- Noyyal
- Ungampalayam
- Aathupalayam Dam
