= Ukkadam Lake =

Lake in Ukkadam, India

Ukkadam Periyakulam Ukkadam Lake
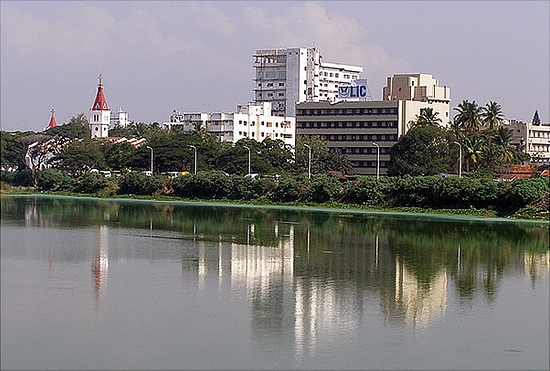

- Location within Tamil Nadu Location within India
- Location: Coimbatore, India
- Coordinates: 10°58′54″N 76°57′17″E
- Primary inflows: Noyyal River canal
- Primary outflows: Valankulam Lake
- Basin countries: India
- Surface area: 1.295 km^{2} (0.500 sq mi)
- Average depth: 5.82 m (19.1 ft)
- Water volume: 1,982,179.262 m^{3} (0.000475550095 cu mi)
- Shore length^{1}: 5.5 km (3.4 mi)
- Settlements: Coimbatore
- ^{1} Shore length is not a well-defined measure.

Ukkadam Lake (Tamil: Ukkadam Periyakulam) is a lake in Ukkadam, Coimbatore, South India. It is spread over an area of 1.295 km^{2} (0.500 sq mi) and has an average depth of 5.82 m (19.1 ft). In 2010, the lake was taken over by Coimbatore Corporation on a 90-year lease from the Public Works Department of the Government of Tamil Nadu.

== Hydrography ==
The lake is fed by canals derived from Noyyal River. The lake also receives water from Selvachinthamani lake located upstream in the north and drain water. The lake has an outlet connecting it with Valankulam lake. The water can be released through four sluice gates located on the south side of the lake.

== Fauna ==
As per a study conducted in 2003–04, the lake had 36 genera of zooplankton including of 8 genera of protozoa and 6 genera of Rotifera with increased eutrophication of the lake. Species Diversity Index of zooplankton population ranged from 1.74 to 3.63 across the year with maximum before the beginning of the summer and end of South-west monsoon.

As per a study on bird diversity conducted in 2013, about 48 species of avifauna belonging to 20 families were recorded. Most species were recorded in March before the start of summer and was the least in the winter months of November and December. Highest bird population was observed in the months of January and February. Various birds including little grebes, painted storks and purple moorhen can be spotted in this lake.

== Fishing ==
Fishing is carried out by local fishermen and enthusiasts. In the 2000s, due to encroachment and the fishes were infected with metals and pathogens from polluted waste water discharged from the sewage. The local fishermen requested the lake to be cleaned up to ensure healthy fish population.

== Environmental concerns ==
The lake became contaminated with effluents from sewage release from the city and was encroached by water hyacinth. In 2010, Coimbatore Corporation unveiled a plan to De-silt the lake and clear the encroachments. The corporation hired external consultants and suggested public-private-partnership model for the development of the lake. In 2013, the de-silting was carried out by the Coimbatore Corporation in association with NGO Siruthuli, Residents Awareness Association of Coimbatore and Vijayalakshmi Charitable Trust. The restoration of the lake was funded partly by the government and partly by private corporations and the activity was carried out with the help of volunteers from public.

== Beautification ==
In 2015, the Coimbatore corporation announced a beautification project at the cost ₹49.5 million (US$510,000). The civic body planned to lay a 1.2 km (0.75 mi) stretch of road exclusively for two-wheelers and beautify the tank bund by installing solar powered lamps and steel fences. The road was inaugurated on June 8, 2015 by the Chief Minister of Tamil Nadu and helped ease traffic congestion in Ukkadam area. It is also known as Marine drive of coimbatore
