= Aathupalayam Dam =

Dam in Tamil Nadu, India

- Location within Tamil Nadu
- Official name: Noyyal Aathupalayam Dam
- Country: India
- Location: K. Paramathi, Karur, Tamil Nadu
- Coordinates: 11°01′42″N 77°49′11″E
- Status: Operational
- Construction began: 1980
- Opening date: 1992

Dam and spillways
- Type of dam: Embankment
- Height: 14 m (46 ft)
- Length: 2,850 m (9,350 ft)
- Spillway capacity: 2,640 m^{3}/s (93,000 cu ft/s)

Reservoir
- Total capacity: 6,660,000 m^{3} (5,400 acre⋅ft)
- Surface area: 1.6 km^{2} (0.62 mi^{2})

The Aathupalayam Dam is situated in Karvazhi Village near Thennilai of K. Paramathi Taluk in Karur District. The parched aycut area has not been receiving supplies as the Aathupalayam reservoir had become a storage tank for Orathuppalayam polluted water flowing down the River Noyyal over the past few years.

The storage facility was meant to harness excess flood water flowing down River Noyyal and draining from the Lower Bhavani Project (LBP) canal to irrigate more than 19,000 acres in Karur District. Usually the excess LBP water flows down the Malayathu Palayam banks only between September and December.

== History ==
The construction work started in 1980 it could be completed only a decade later due to various factors including technical and financial delays leading to cost and time over runs.

However, the joy of the farmers was short lived as by 1995 the reservoir had become a repository of polluted water and sludge carried by Noyyal River from the dyeing and bleaching factories in Tiruppur and Coimbatore regions.

== Present ==
After the aycutdars repeatedly represented to the State government to bring the reservoir to proper use, a plan was executed to block the polluted waters of Noyyal River from entering the reservoir and allowing the LBP canal water to drain into the reservoir by constructing a check dam and work has almost been completed.

But the inlet canals, reservoir bed and other sites have silted up heavily for want of proper maintenance over the past 20 years. The sluices and shutters have been damaged heavily and have fallen prey to nature's vagaries.

== See also ==
- List of reservoirs and dams in India
- Noyyal
- Ungampalayam
- Orathuppalayam Dam
