= VOC park and zoo =

V O Chidambaranar park and zoo
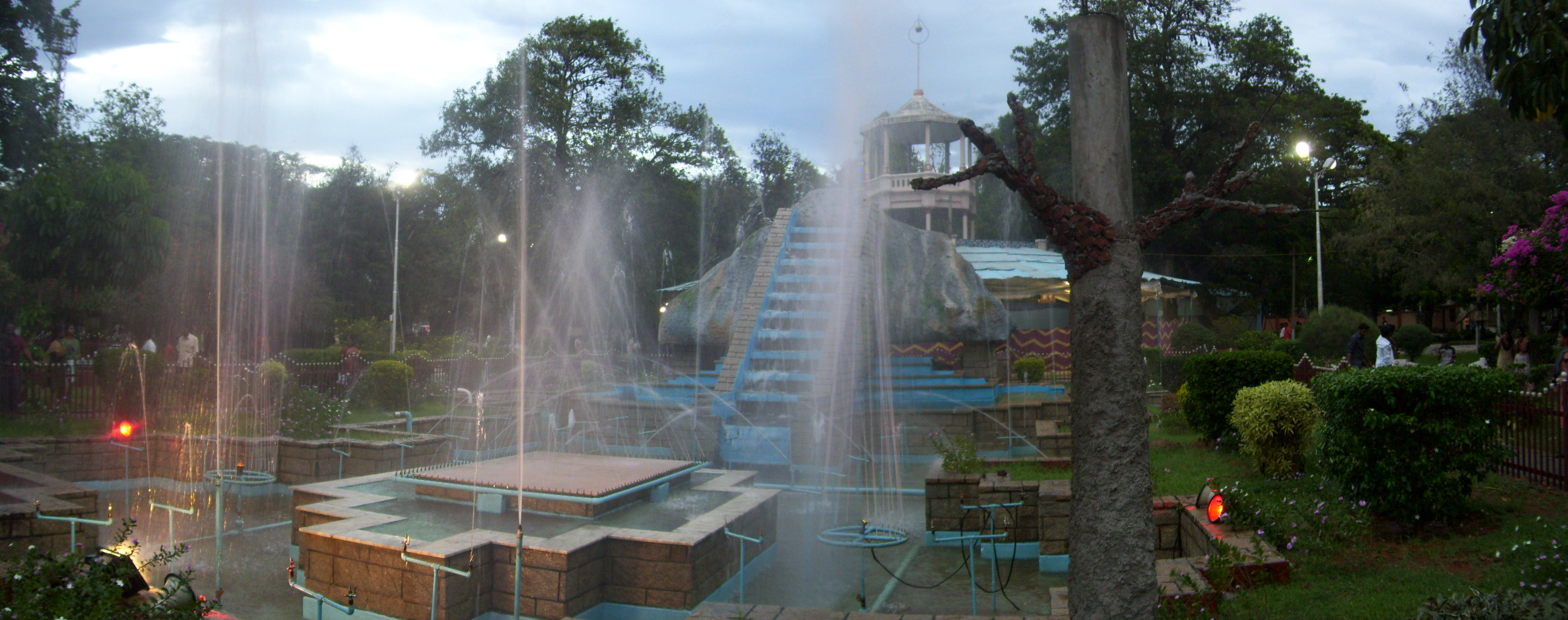
- VOC park
- Interactive map of V O Chidambaranar park and zoo
- 11.005718°N 76.970914°E
- Location: Coimbatore, Tamil Nadu, India
- Land area: 4.5 acres (1.8 ha)
- No. of animals: 543
- Memberships: CZA
- Website: coimbatore.nic.in/tourism.html

V O Chidambaranar park and zoo (abbreviated VOC park) is a zoological garden and amusement park located in Coimbatore, Tamil Nadu, India. As of 2013, the park houses around 890 animals including 335 birds, 106 mammals and 54 reptiles. The park is named after freedom fighter V O Chidambaram Pillai and is managed by Coimbatore city Corporation.

== Park and grounds ==
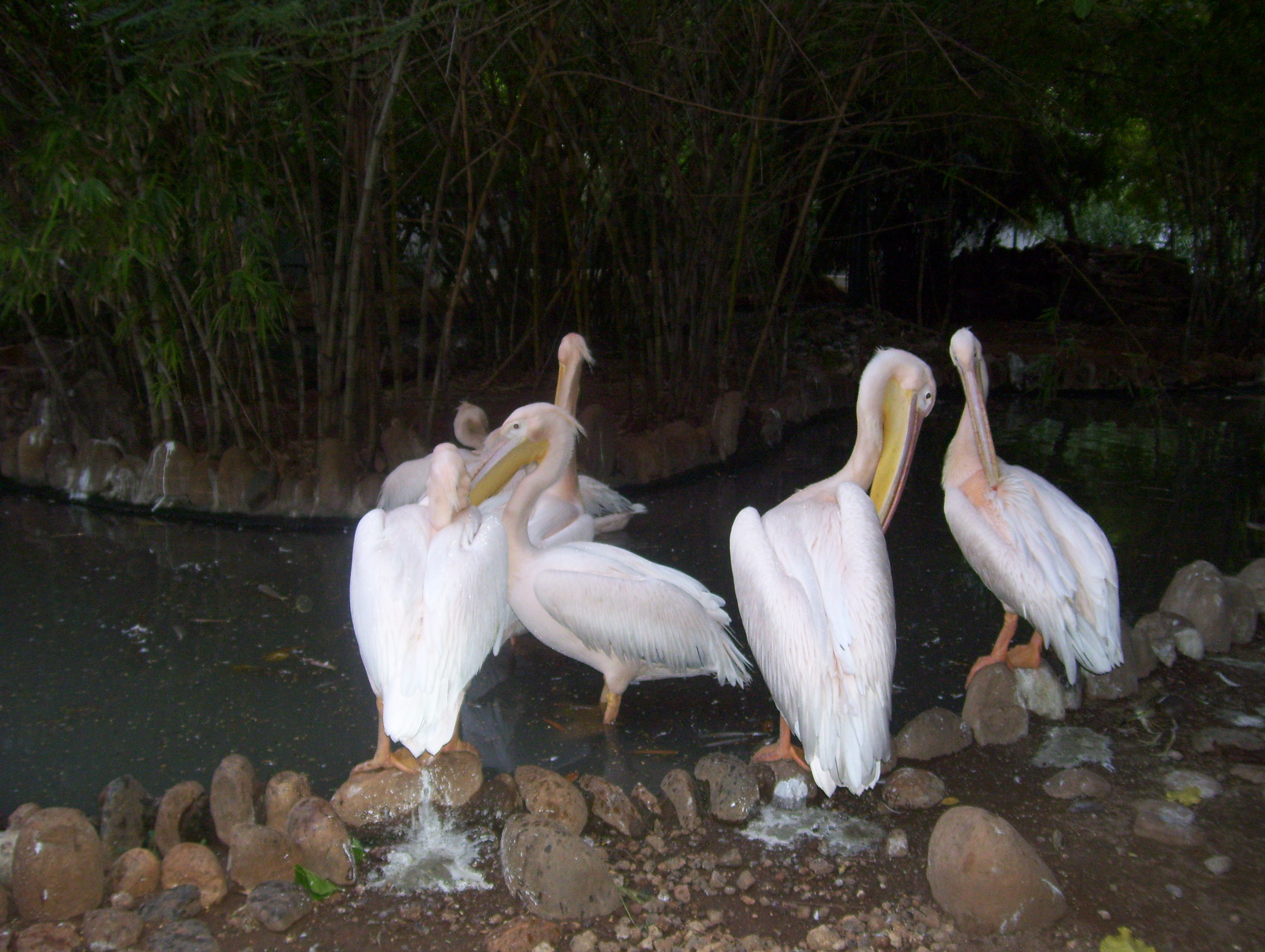
Pelicans at the zoo

There is a park, children's play area and ground associated with the zoo. The park also has a toy train, Jurassic Park and aquarium. The grounds are used for conducting fairs and events including the annual Independence day and Republic day celebrations. The park has over 200 species of trees including Sandalwood. A rosy pelican hatchling was born in the zoo after 14 yrs, this species is known to have a low fertility rate.

== Opening Timing ==
The park opened from 4.00PM To 7.30PM on weekdays and 10.00AM to 7.30PM on weekends. Tuesday is Holiday. The zoo is currently temporarily closed for visitors.

== Exhibits ==
The park has 29 species of mammals, birds including rosy pelican, Sarus Crane, Adjutant Stork, night heron and reptiles.

Animals at the park as of 31 March 2017 include:

Group	Number of species	Number of animals
Mammals	07	96
Birds	16	381
Reptiles	06	66
Total	29	543

== Gallery ==
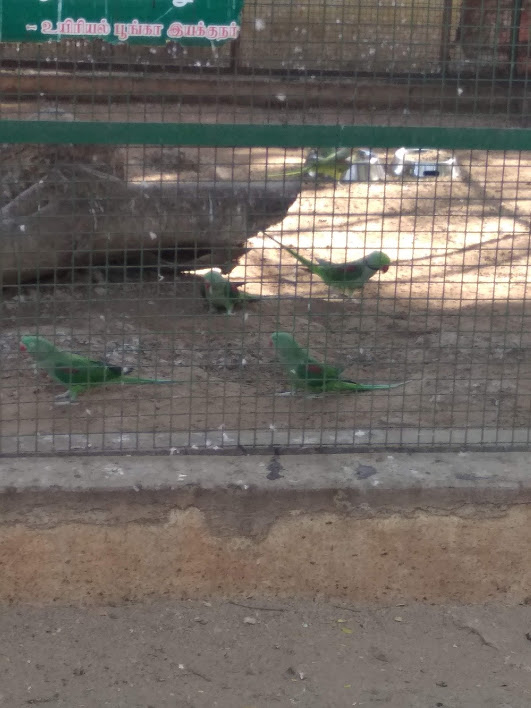

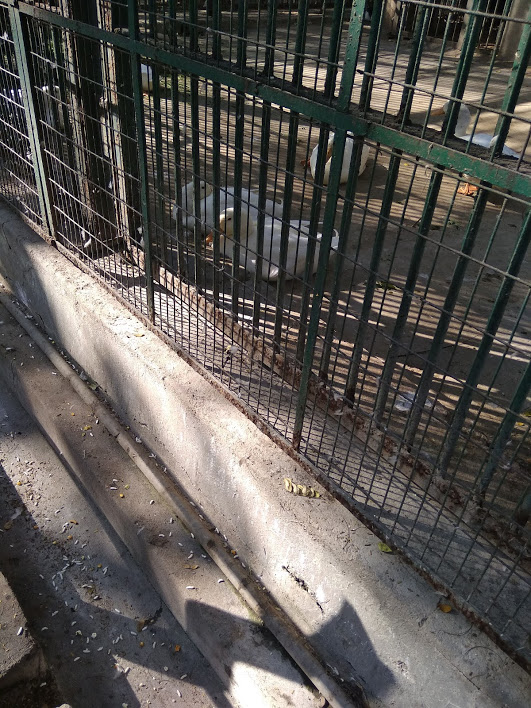

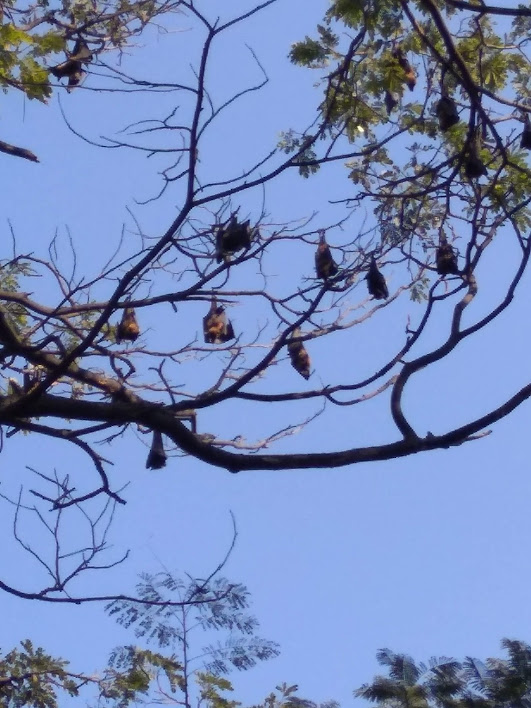

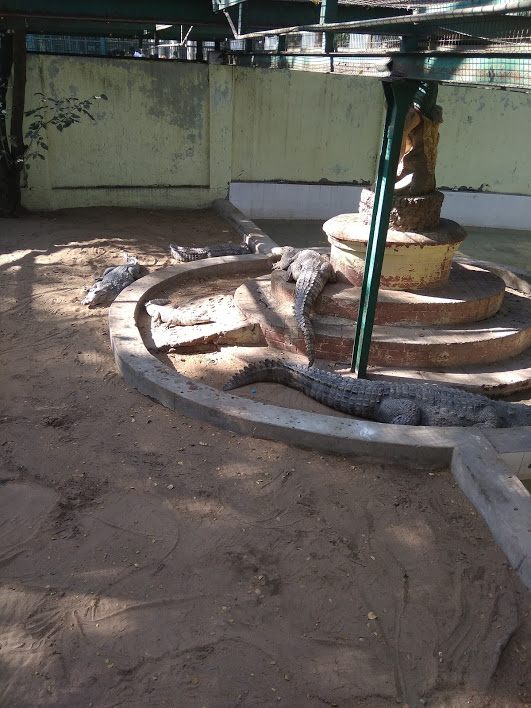

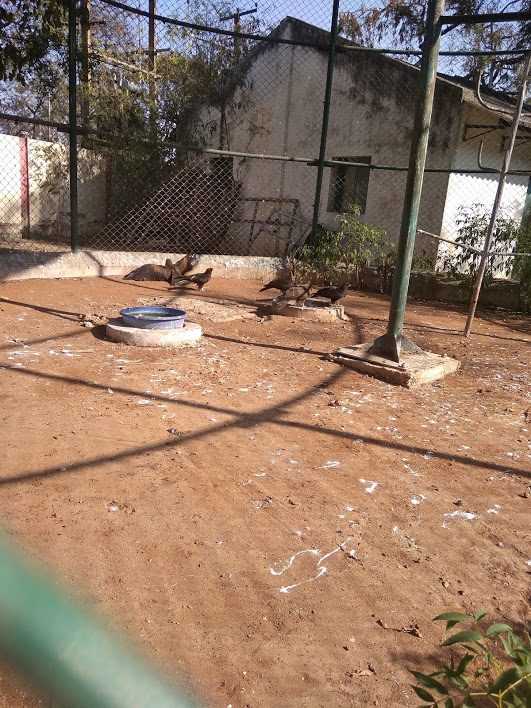

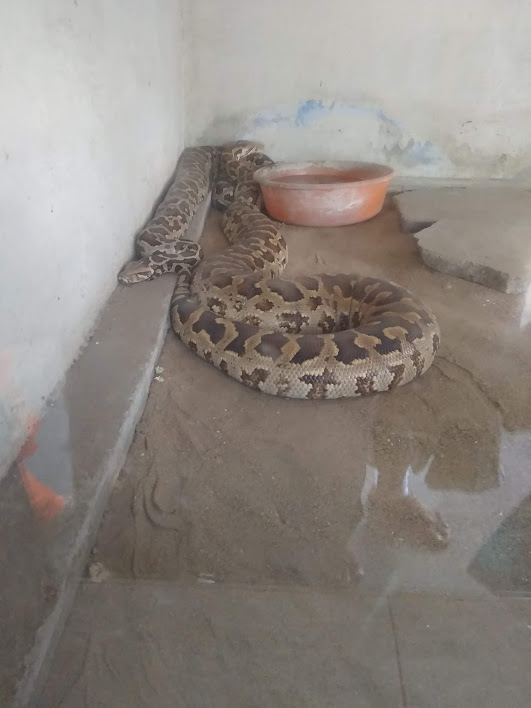

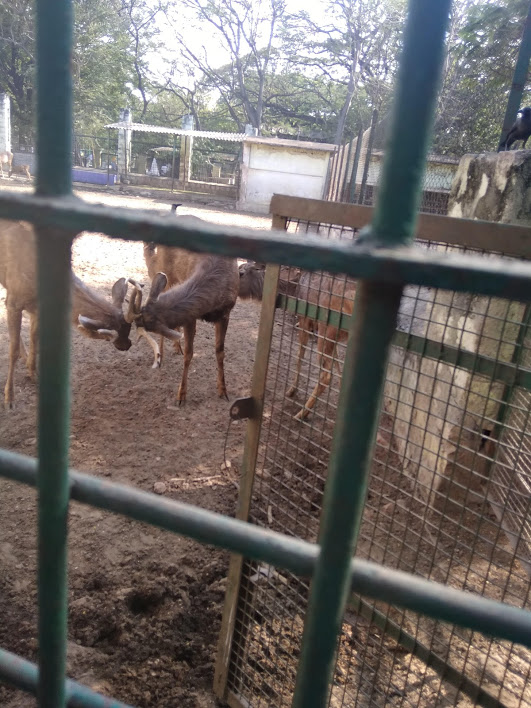

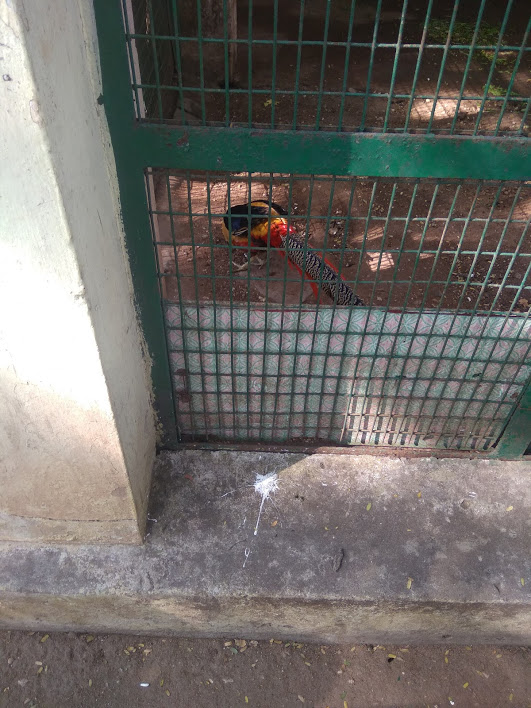

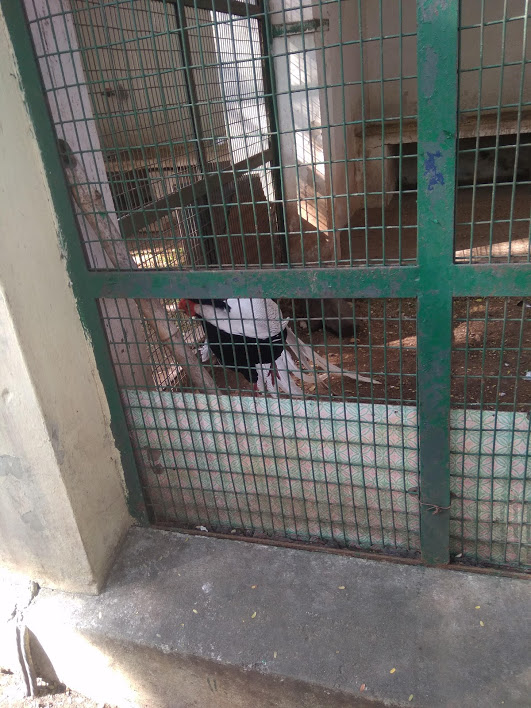

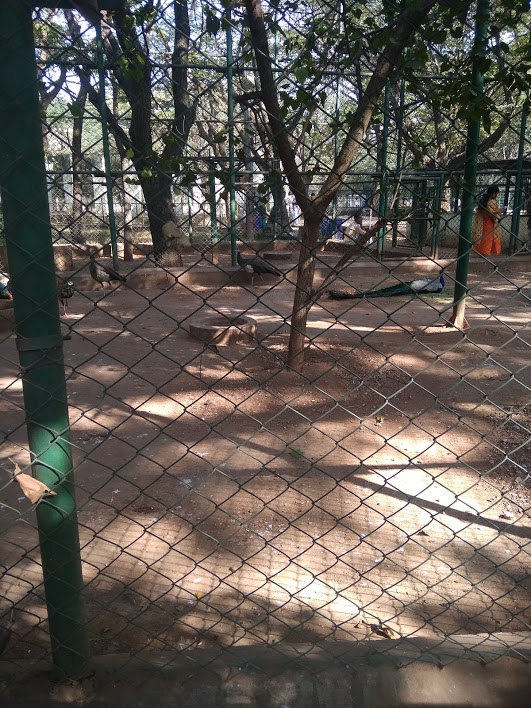

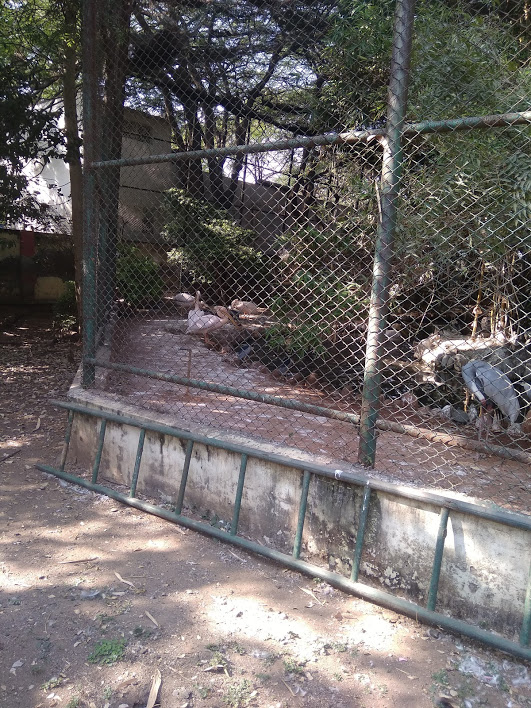

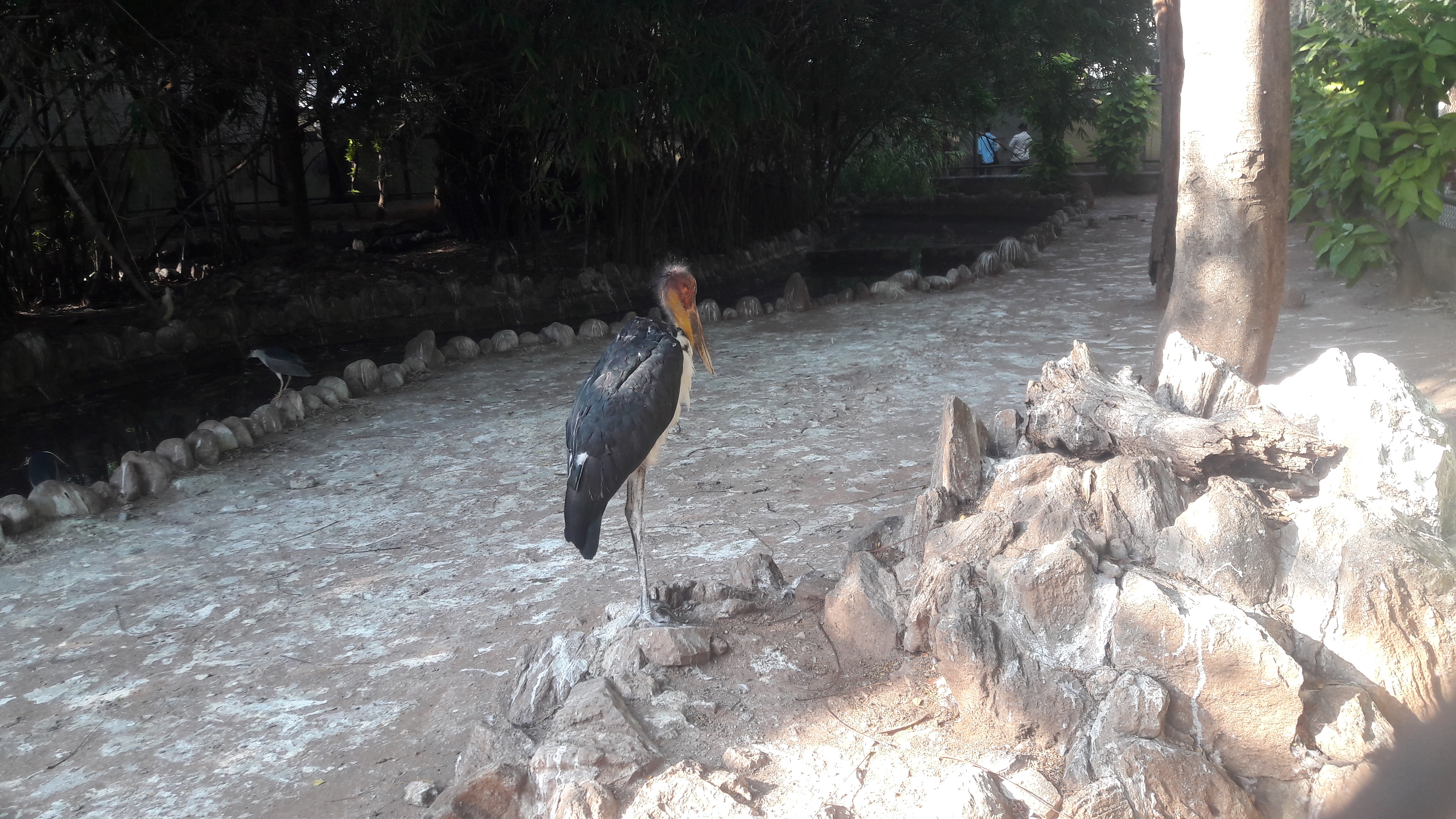
White ibis in VOC zoological garden, Coimbatore

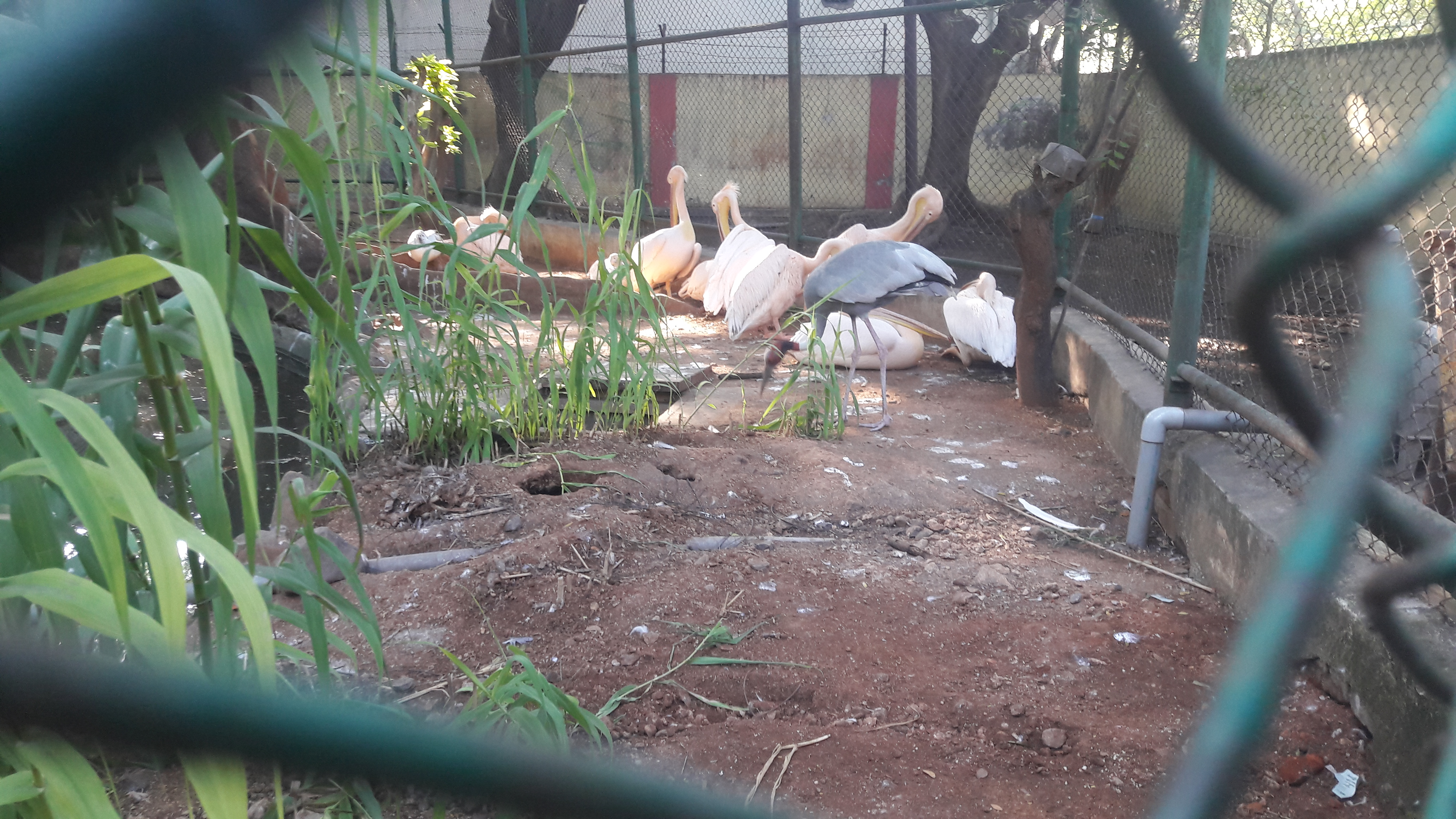
Great white pelican and white necked stork in VOC zoological garden, Coimbatore

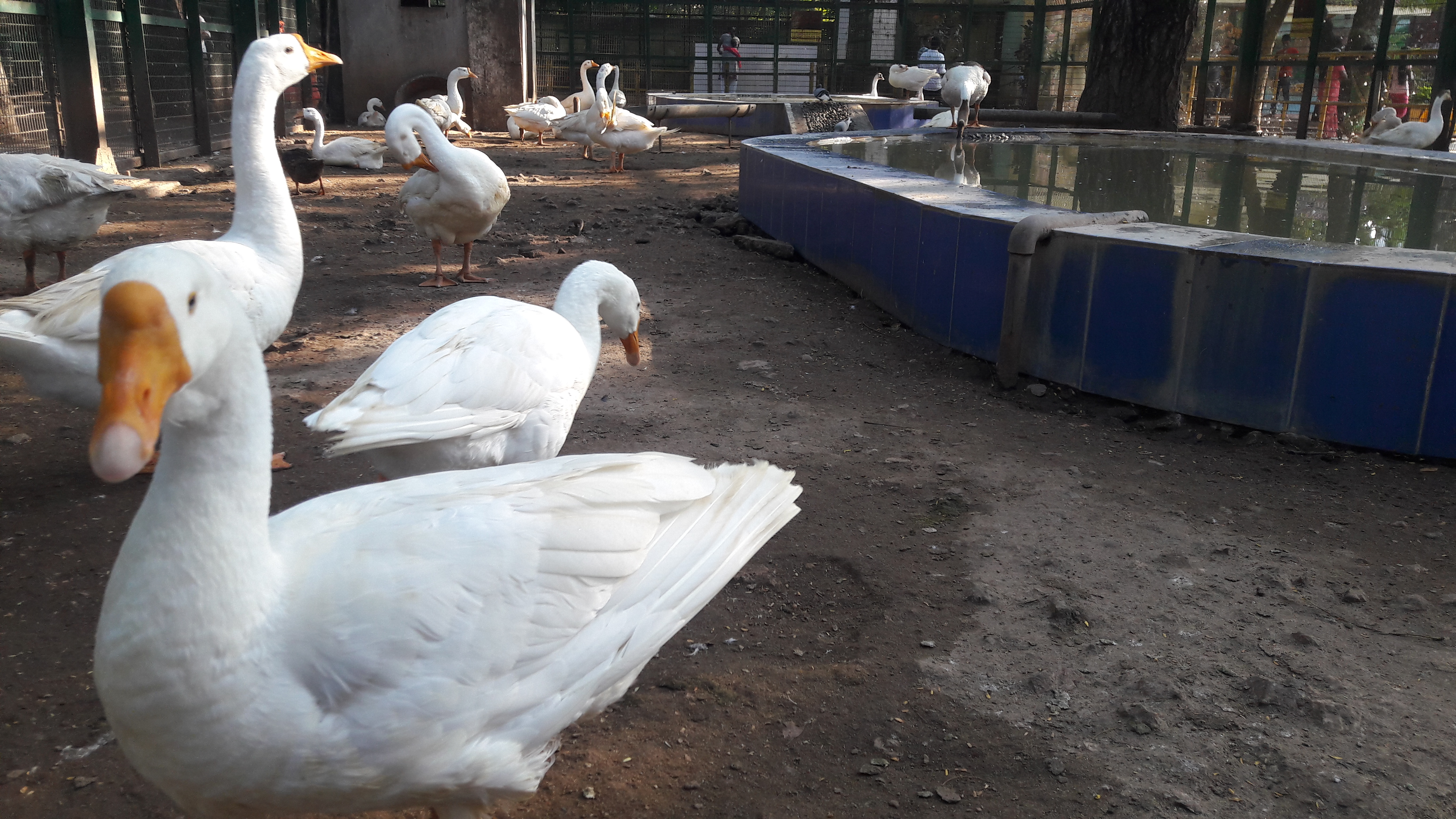
Goose in VOC zoological garden, Coimbatore

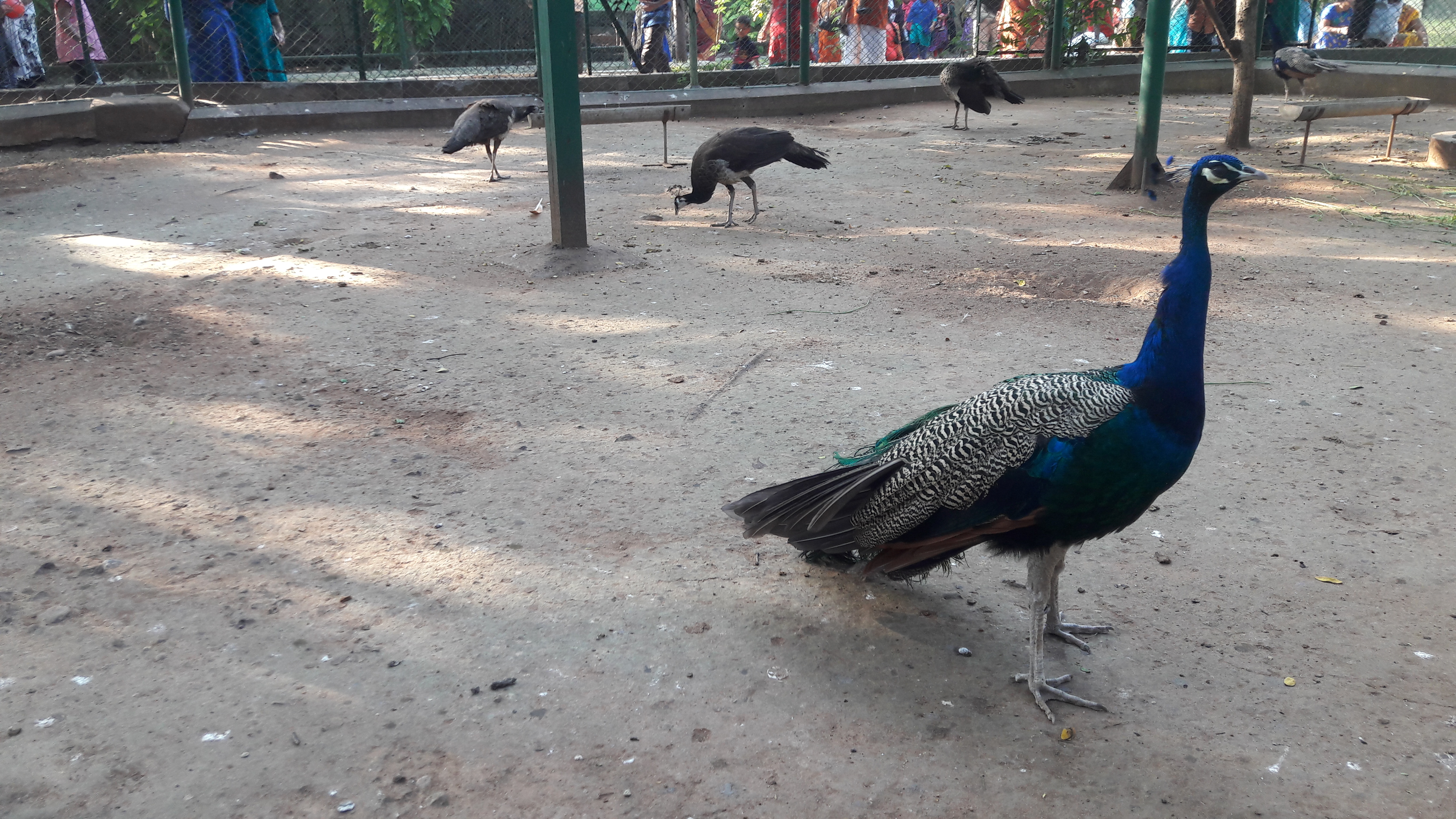
Peacock in VOC zoological garden, Coimbatore

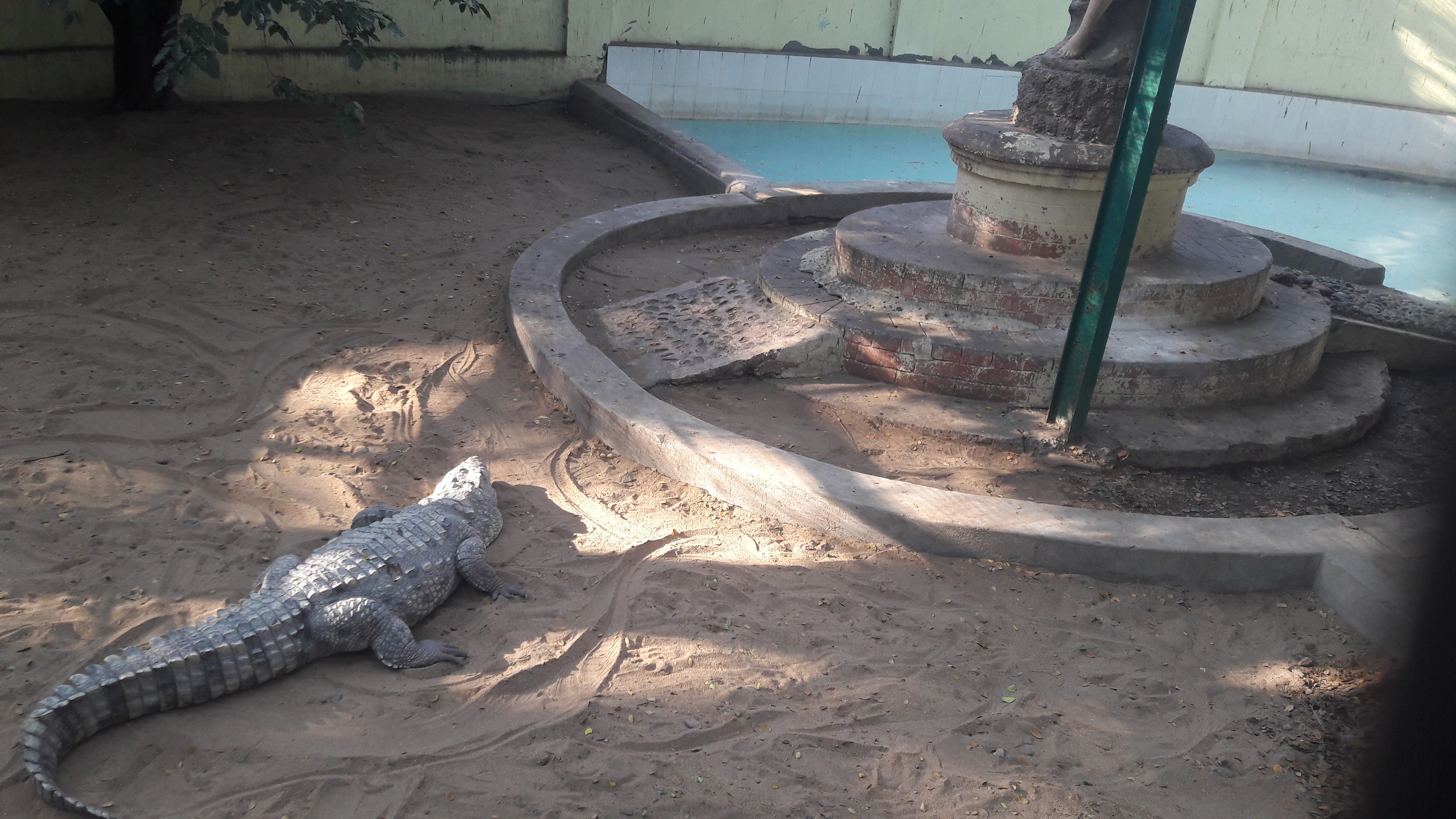
Mugger crocodile in VOC zoological garden, Coimbatore

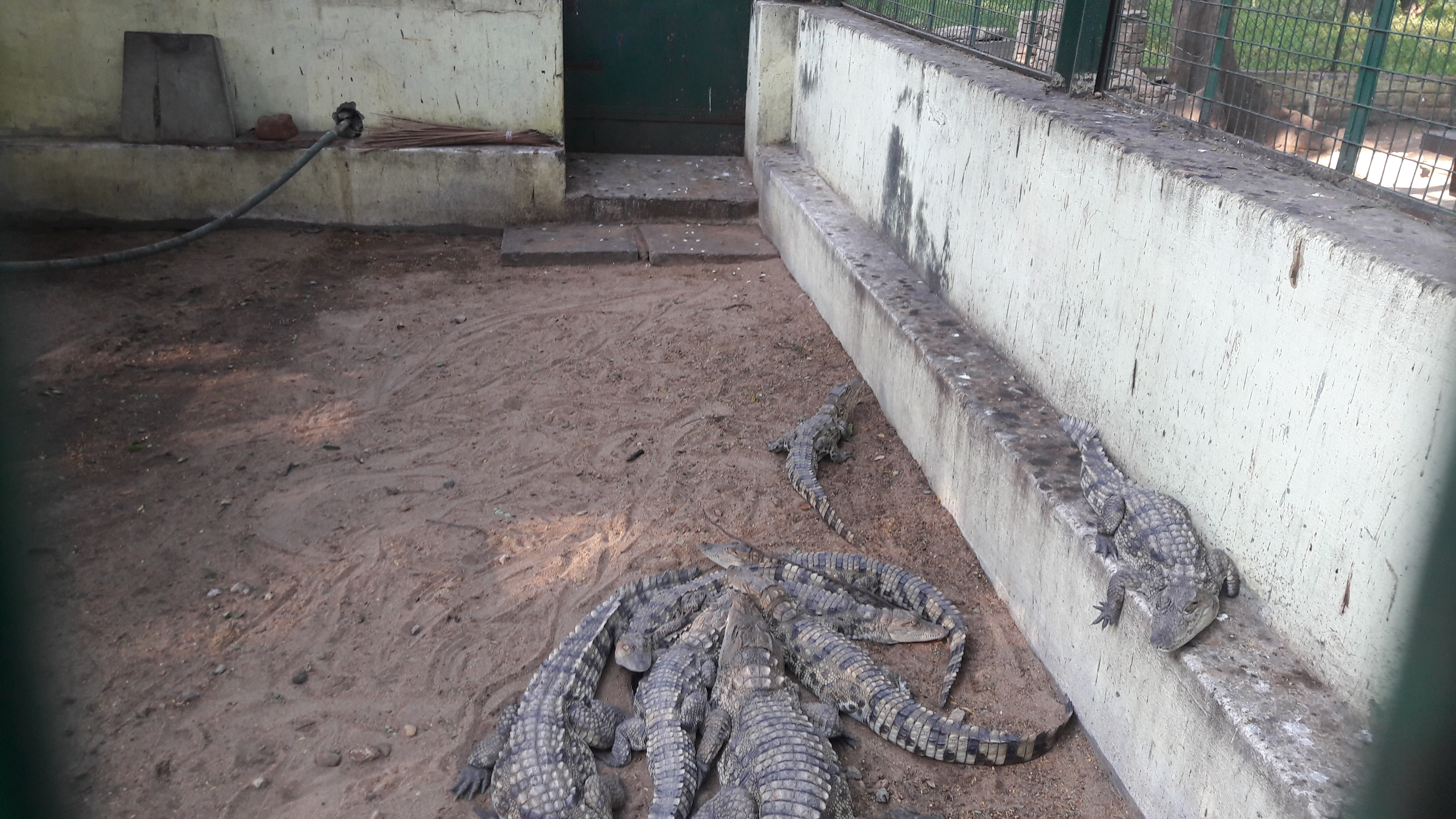
Baby mugger crocodile in VOC zoological garden, Coimbatore

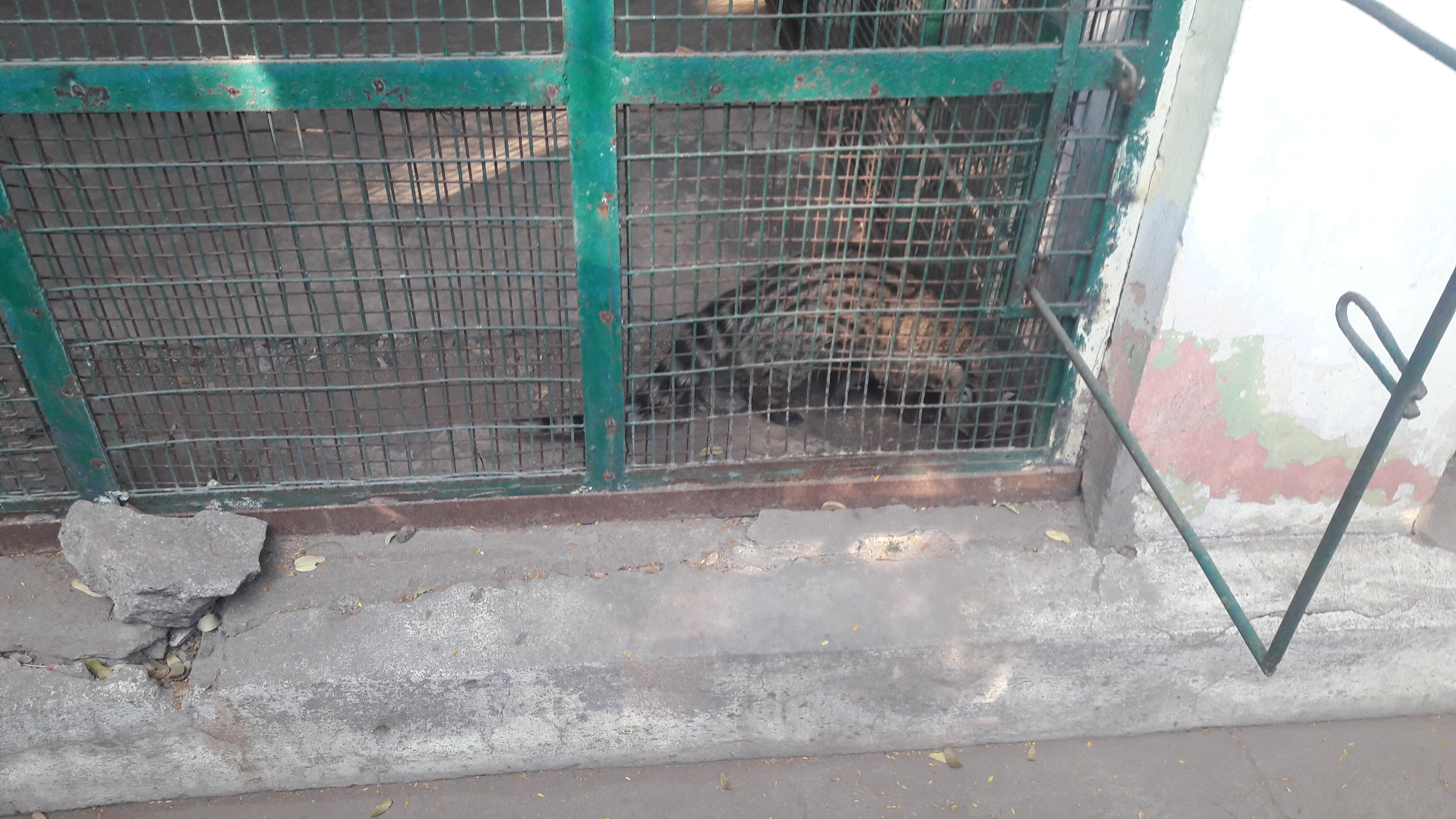
Civet in VOC zoological garden, Coimbatore

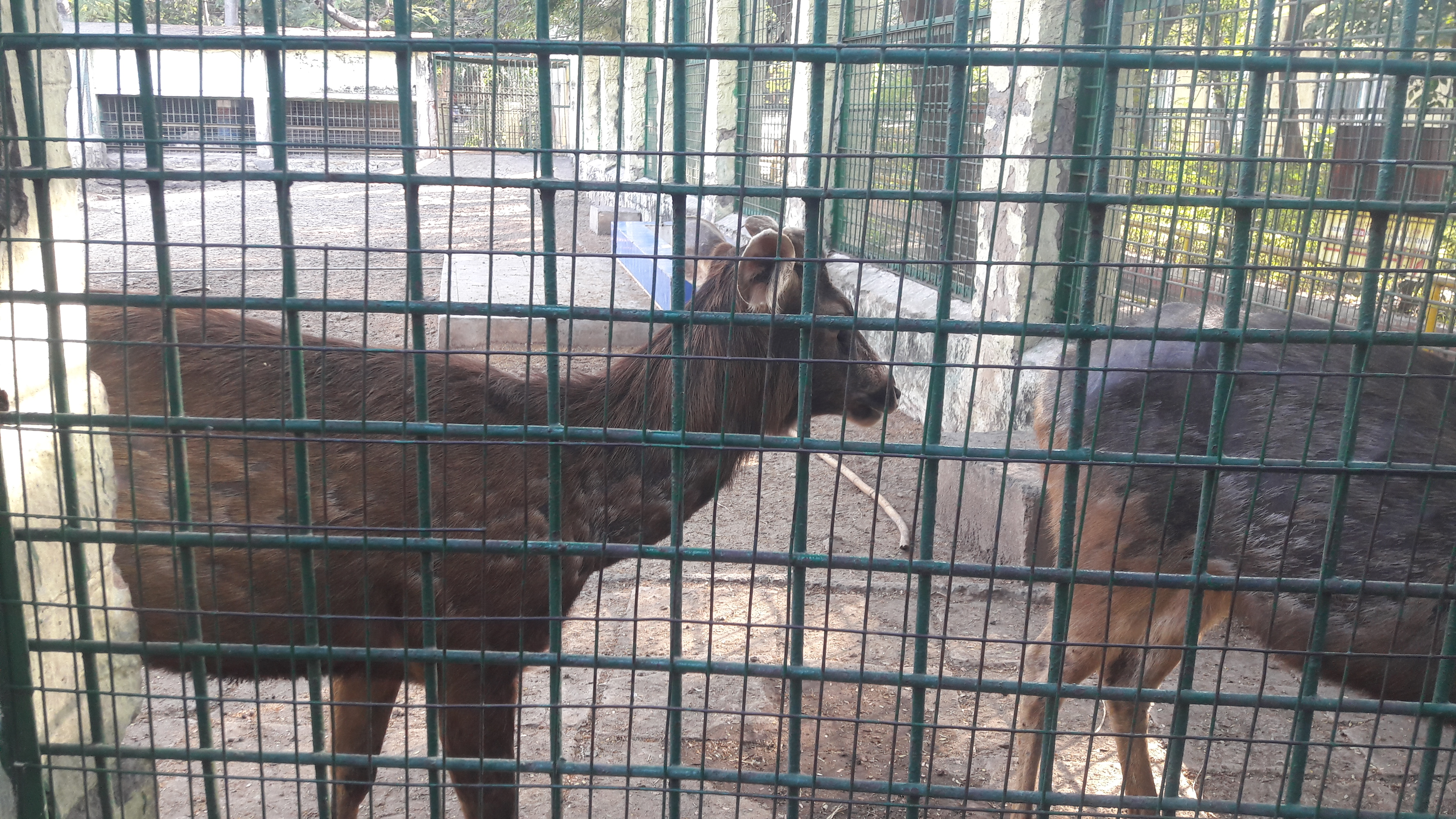
Male Sambar deer in VOC zoological garden, Coimbatore
