= Kodumanal =

Village in India

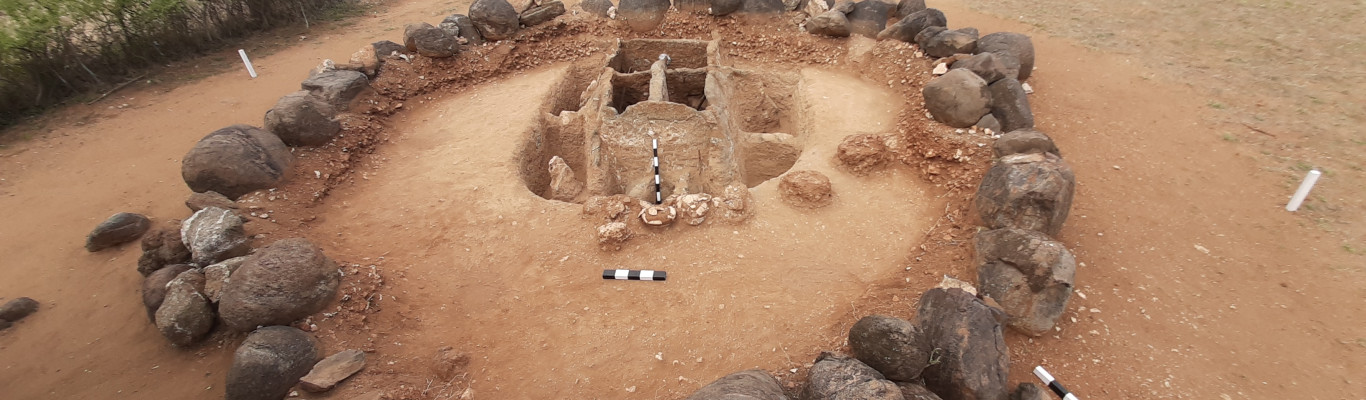

- Location in Tamil Nadu, India
- 11.0125°N 78.16°E
- Location: Erode, Tamil Nadu, India

Kodumanal is a village located in the Erode district in the southern Indian state of Tamil Nadu. It was once a flourishing ancient trade city known as Kodumanam, as inscribed in Patittrupathu of Sangam Literature. The place is an important archaeological site, under the control of the State Archaeological Department of Tamil Nadu. It is located on the northern banks of Noyyal River, a tributary of the Cauvery.

== The ancient city ==
The inhabitants of this destroyed ancient city of Chera dynasty were highly skilled craftsmen, who were specialized in making beads and high-quality iron. The place is referred to in Sangam literature as an important industrial centre that had links with the Chola port city of Kaveripoompattinam, now called Poompuhar.

== Roman trade route ==
The city played a major role in Indo-Roman trade and relations, as the ancient city is located on the mid-way of a Roman trade route, linking Muziris port on the Malabar Coast with the Kaveripoompattinam (Puhar) Port in the Coromandel Coast.

== Iron and metal ==
The iron and steel furnaces and iron artefacts produced in these places revealed the technical advancement made by the iron smelters around 500 BC. The excavated sword bit contained spheroidal graphite phase and forge welding of high-carbon cutting edge. This place was once celebrated for its trade in precious stones like garnet, carnelian, lapis lazuli, sapphire and quartz. The people of this city were experts in manufacturing the finest iron.

== Collections ==
Excavations uncovered ancient iron objects such as arrow heads and swords. They also produced Roman artefacts, iron melting furnaces, beads, shell bangles and pottery with the Tamizhi scripts (from the habitation deposits and burials). Other artifacts uncovered during the excavation of this site include roulette pottery, Roman silver coins, and gold and silver spirals. A bronze statue of a lion and the iron melting furnaces were important to deciphering the site's history.
