= Dharmalinga Malai =

Shiva temple in Tamil Nadu, India

Coordinates: 10.904582°N 76.932626°E

Dharmalinga Malai is a Shiva temple on top of a hill near Coimbatore, in the state of Tamil Nadu, India. Lord Dharmalingeswaraswamy, the temple deity, is a Swayambumurthi (self-manifested). The temple is located 13 km south of Coimbatore city. The temple is situated in Marappalam, Madukkarai in Coimbatore District.

There are nearly 800 steps to reach the top of the temple.

== Chitra Poornima festival ==
Devotees undertake Girivalam - circumambulating around the hill on Poornima - full moon days. Around 35 to 40 thousand devotees undertake Chitra poornima Girivalam - circumambulating around the hill.

== Other festivals ==
Annadhanam will be given to devotees on all full moon and Pradosha days. Bajans are sung in the temple during the whole night of Maha Shivrathri in March - April.

Pradosha, new moon days are observed with special poojas and aradhanas. Annabishekam is performed on Aipasi Poornima day and on Thaipoosam in October- November, and January - February respectively.

== Gallery ==
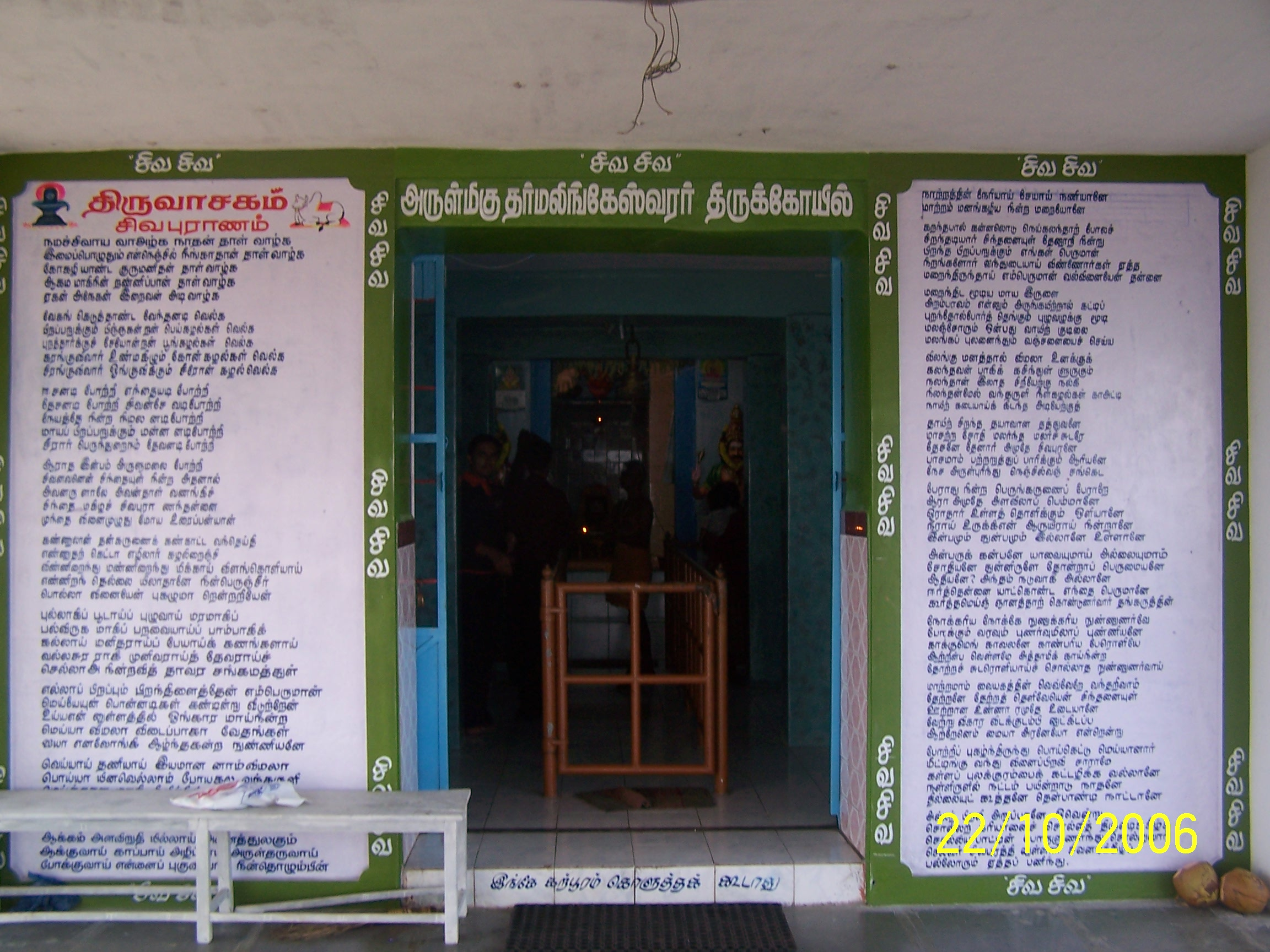
Dharmalingamali Temple

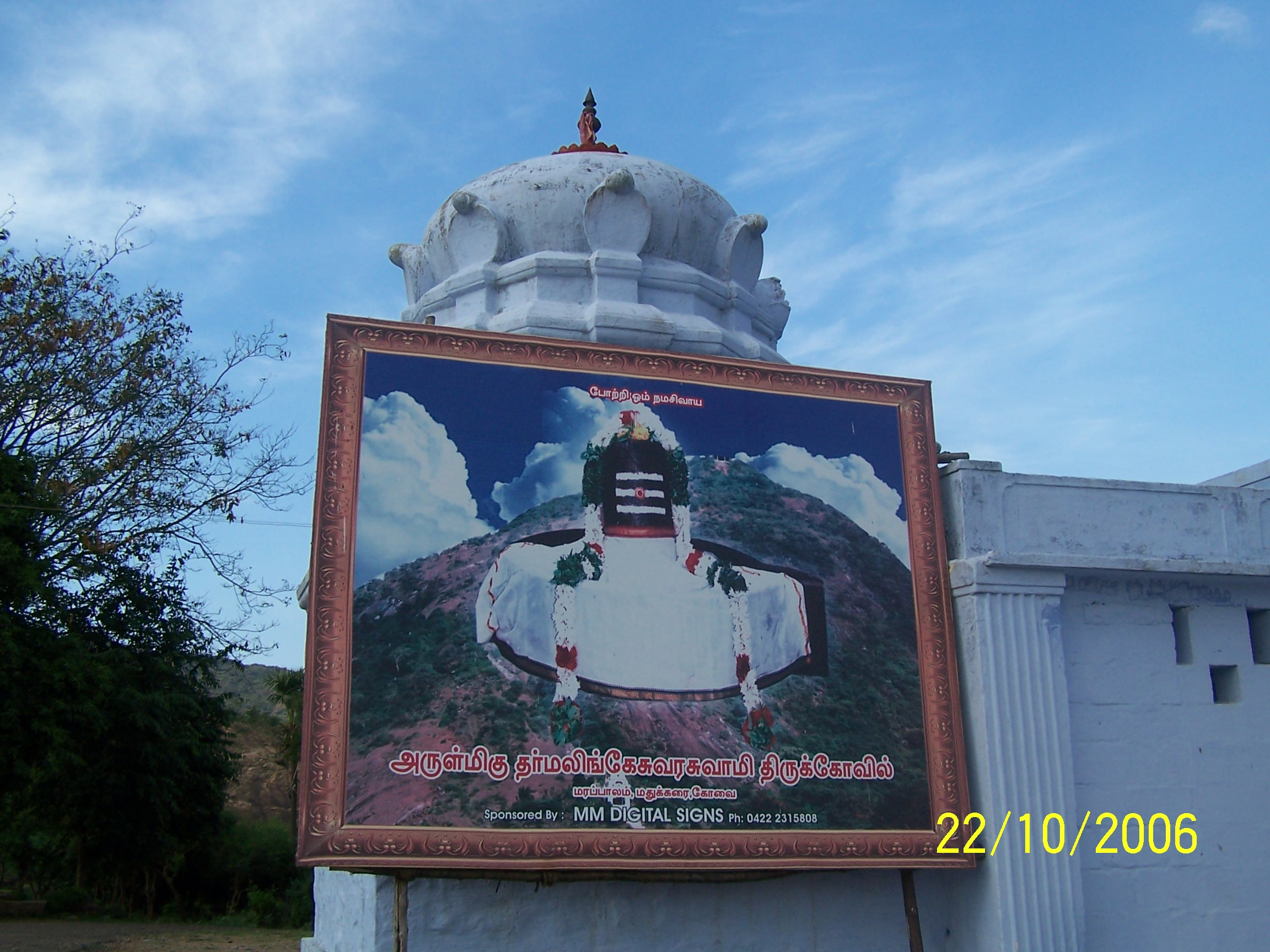
Dharmalingamali Adivaram

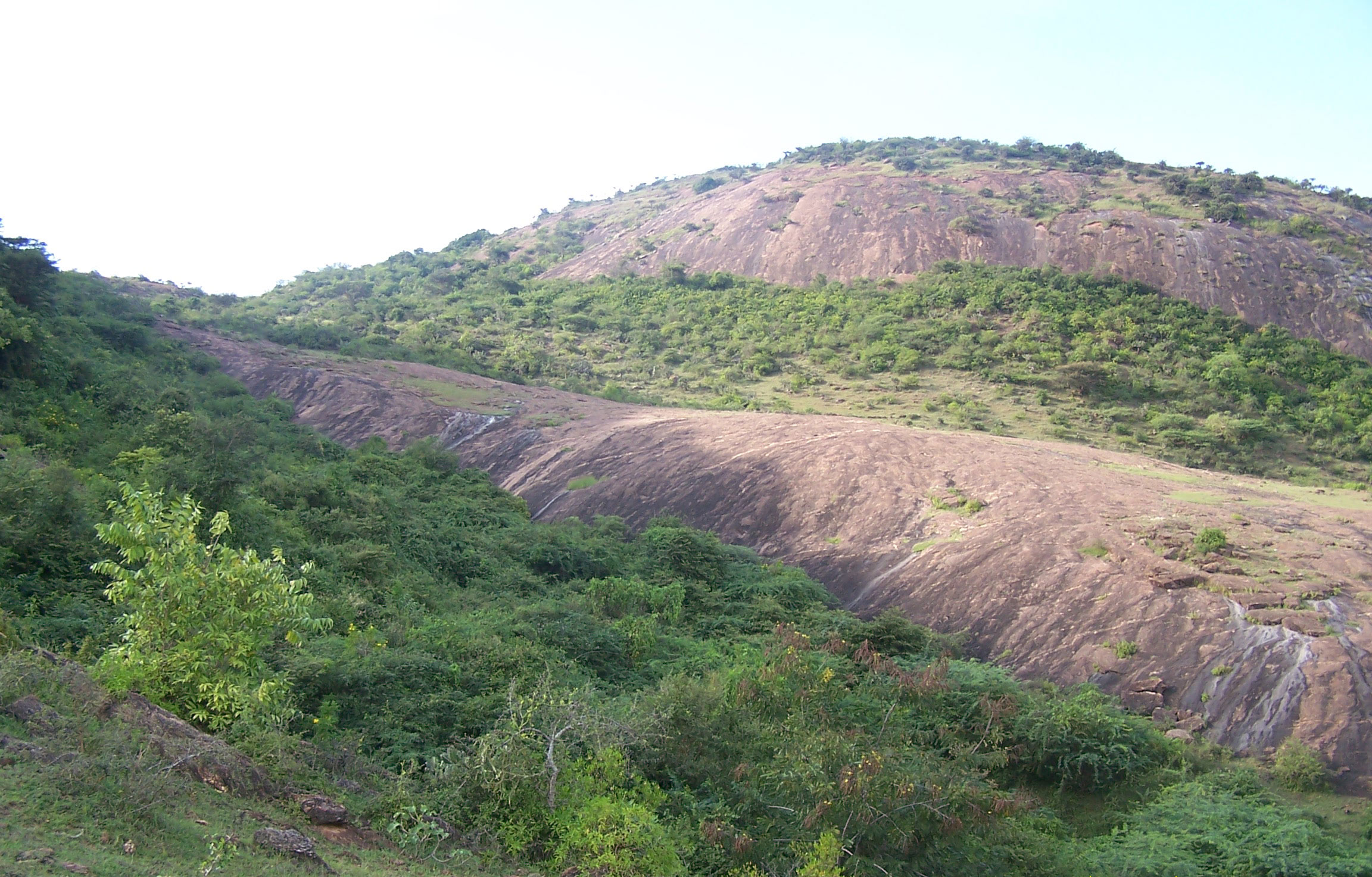
View from dharma lingamalai

== Connectivity ==
Lots of government and private buses are there from Gandhipuram and Ukkadam bus stand to Marappalam, some of bus route nos- 3, 3B, 96, 48, 3E. the nearest railway station is the Madukkarai railway station.
