= Thirumurthyswami Temple =

Hindu temple in Tamil Nadu, India

The Thirumurthyswami temple is a Hindu temple dedicated to Ammalingeswarar situated at the foothills of the Thirumurthy Hills at a distance of 96 kilometres from Coimbatore and 21 kilometres from Udumalaipettai. There is a stream running close by the temple and a waterfall located at a distance of 1 kilometre from the temple where devotees take a bath.
