= Naga Sai Mandir =

Sri Naga Sai Mandir
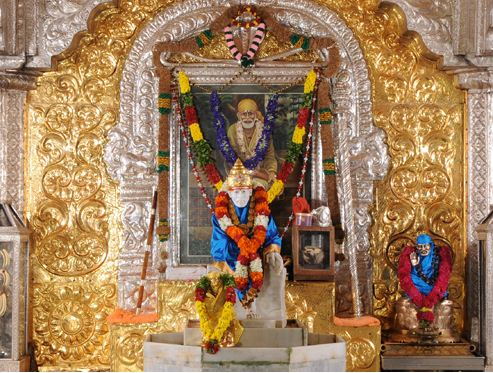
- Image Of The Deity

- Location within Tamil Nadu

Religion
- Affiliation: Hinduism
- District: Coimbatore
- Deity: Shirdi Sai Baba
- Festival: Ramnavami Day for 9 days Darshan Day on 7 January Maha Samadhi Day for 10 days Guru Poornima

Location
- Location: Mettupalayam Road, Coimbatore
- State: Tamil Nadu
- Country: India
- Interactive map of Sri Naga Sai Mandir
- Coordinates: 11°01′38″N 76°57′02″E

Architecture
- Type: Tamil architecture
- Completed: 1939

Website
- http://www.srinagasai.com

Sri Naga Sai Mandir is a Hindu temple dedicated to the Indian Spiritual Master Shirdi Sai Baba in Coimbatore in the Indian state of Tamil Nadu.

== History ==
In 1939, Sn. H.H.B.V. Narasimha Swamiji, Sri. C.Varadaraja Ayyah, Sri A.V. K. Chari started the Sai movement in Coimbatore.

The temple was established in 1939. The Institution named for Sri Saibaba Mutt was put up darsana of the Devotees. Swamiji entrusted the center to the care of Sri. A.V. K. Chari. In 1942, the late Sn. C.Varadaraja Ayyah donated around one acre of land on Mettupalayam Road, and Thatched Shed was evicted from the donated land meant to house the Sri Sai Baba Mission- later named Sri Sai Baba Madam. The place was opened for worship to everyone regardless of class, creed, caste or religion. The Sai Baba Madam was the meeting ground of Sai Devotees in and around Coimbatore. Sai Bhajans were held regularly on Sundays and Thursdays.

A marble statue of Shirdi Sai Baba was installed by Sathya Sai Baba (the Indian guru thought to have been the reincarnation of Shirdi Sai Baba himself) on February 26, 1961. This was the first time that Sathya Sai Baba formally installed an idol of Shirdi Sai Baba for daily worship.

The temple is called Naga Sai Mandir after a story told by Shirdi Sai Baba’s followers of a snake, Nãga, that rose from the flowers in the garden to listen to Shirdi Sai when he was giving darshan to devotees before disappearing.

=== Advent of 'Sri Naga Sai' ===
Historical of the shrine of Sri Naga Sai ( Shirdi Sai As Sri Naga Sai in Coimbatore):

“On the evening of Thursday, January 7, 1943, a miracle happened. A shining and lustrous Cobra, small in size but possessing an unusually large hood with the divine marks of Tripundra, Shanka and Chakra, appeared before Baba’s picture while the Bhajan was playing to the accompaniment of drum cymbals and other instruments with all the lights on. The Naga stood in a pose of worship fully entranced in Baba Music! The waving of lights, and aratis had no effect on the Cobra. People who had formed a crowd of a few hundred, stood there in awe and wonder at the sight of the Naga with its spread hood. There was no fear of the snake; the proverb, “even a battalion of soldiers of valour shiver at the sight of a cobra,” was proven wrong then. Men young and old, women and children began to pour into the spacious land of the Bhajan Madam by the thousands to witness the Naga that lingered in the same spot for 17 Hours. Baba bhaktas began to shower basket after basket of flowers in worshipful reverence of the Naga. The Cobra was nearly submerged in a mound of flowers but even then, he was immobile were performed for the Naga.

On the second day of Naga’s onset, a photographer came to take a photo of the Naga in its majesty but it was submerged under heaps of flowers. No one had the courage to go near the spot where the cobra was lodged and clear away the flowers. The only course open to them was to pray. The Naga jumped out of the heaps of flowers and appeared for the photograph as if in answer to the prayers of the multitude. All who witnessed the sight were sure for the first time that it was on the week of Sai Baba. The devotees then prayed with fervor and faith to the Naga to clear out and enable them to resume their routine worship of Baba in the Madam. Then the immobile Naga showed sign of movement and went around Sri Sai Baba’s picture and slowly slithered out into the open and disappeared into the bushes where later an ant-hill (a snake’s natural habitat) appeared."

Advent of 'Sri Naga Sai' was published in Holy Shri Sai Satcharita Tamil Chapter 35.

The place where the Naga disappeared from is held as ‘Holy Ground’ by devotees and from that day onward Shirdi Sai Baba in Coimbatore has been worshiped as “Sri Naga Sai”. The Shirdi Sai Baba ( Sri Naga Sai ) marble statue of the deity, was installed and consecrated on February 26, 1961 by Sri Sathya Sai Baba"

== Sacred Stick ==
The temple holds a stick was used by Shirdi Sai Baba, brought from Shirdi. The Holy stick is used to bless all devotees who visit the shrine.

== Golden Chariot ==
Sri Naga Sai Trust Holy Shrine of Shirdi Sai Baba to have a Golden Chariot ( Thanga Ther ) with a Golden Idol of Sai Baba in the world and was dedicated to Baba on 6 June 2007. The Chariot comes around the prakaram once in a week on Thursdays at 8.00pm.

== Dhuni ==
The Sacred Dhuni flame has been brought from Bangalore Mandir which got the original Dhuni flame from shirdi. The udi from the dhuni is given as prasadam to all the devotees. this udi has the power to cure all diseases.

== The Sri Naga Sai Trust ==
The temple is managed and maintained by Sri Naga Sai Trust and consists of the following:

- Sri Naga Sai Mandir
- Sai Baba Vidyalayam Middle School
- Sai Deep Kalyana Mandapam
- Free Homeopathy Clinic
