= Noyyal River =

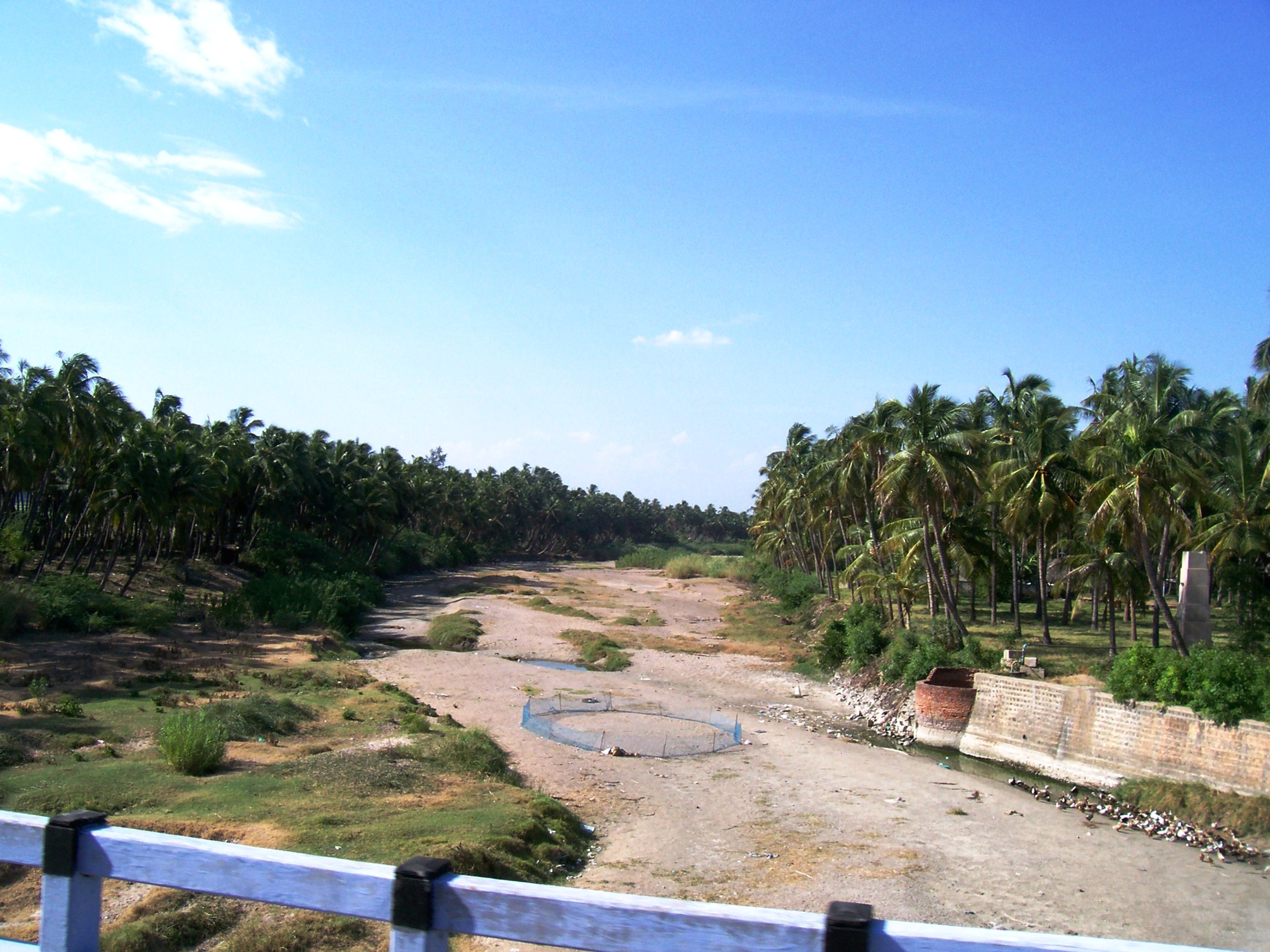
- Noyyal River bed

Location
- Country: India

Physical characteristics
- Source
  - location: Western Ghats in Tamil Nadu
- Mouth
  - location: Kaveri
- Length: 180 km (110 mi)
- Basin size: 3,500 km^{2} (1,400 sq mi)

Noyyal is a 180 km (110 mi)–long seasonal river in Western Tamil Nadu, India. It is a tributary of the Kaveri river. The river rises in the Vellingiri hills, a division of the Nilgiri Biosphere Reserve, in the Western Ghats, and flows westwards through the cities of Coimbatore, and Tirupur, before draining into the Kaveri at Noyyal in Karur district. The river basin covers an area of 3,500 km^{2} (1,400 sq mi), which consists of 1,800 km^{2} (690 sq mi) of cultivable lands. This stretch has 23 dams and 32 tanks. It provides drinking water for millions of people in Tamil Nadu, India.

The river is seasonal, and dependent on the monsoon. An extensive tank system has been developed to store the river water and the overflow during monsoon. There are several check dams, and two larger dams–Aathupalayam and Orathuppalayam. Flowing through major urban areas, the river is highly polluted and faces significant ecological concern.

== History ==
Noyyal is a sacred river for the Tamils. The word 'Noyyal' means 'one who is relieved of diseases'. It is referred to as Kanchimanadi in the Tamil text Perur Puranam. Its present name refers to the name of the point where it pours into the river Kaveri, changed in 1750 AD. The Noyyal River and its interconnected tank and canal system is believed to have been built by the Cholas, as a system of water transport, and storage. This system helped in maintaining unchanged water levels under the ground. Excess water was conveyed to the storage tanks, which also helped in refilling the spring water. After urbanisation, storage tanks were drastically removed and only 11 remained.

== Course ==
The river rises in the Vellingiri hills in the Western Ghats, and flows westwards towards Coimbatore. After passing through Tirupur, and covering a total distance of 180 km (110 mi), Noyyal joins the Kaveri river at Noyyal in Karur district. The river is seasonal and fed by monsoon. Tributaries and rivulets include Cheyyar, Kausika, and Periar, which join the river during its course.

From the source, the river valley consists of kankar soil for a stretch of 25 km (16 mi) to a depth of 60 m (198 ft). It extends from the origin of the river to the Ukkadam Lake in Coimbatore.

== Water storage ==
The Noyyal River system has an extensive network of canals, and tanks. Surplus water from the river spilled into the canals and were channeled to the tanks, preventing flooding, and was used to replenish the ground water and for utilisation later. However, the system was neglected and the number of functional water bodies has reduced to eleven by 2003. This has had a profound effect on agriculture in the region.

There are two major dams–Orathuppalayam (near Chennimalai) and Aathupalayam (near Vellakoil), which were commissioned with the aim of irrigating about 20,000 acres of land in Tirupur and Karur districts. The Orathuppalayam dam has been decommissioned and acts as effluent storage tank. There are about 23 check dams.

== Pollution ==
As a result of its course through major urban areas, the river Noyyal, and is polluted with several heavy metals. Samples of water and a freshwater crab species collected from the river have revealed presence of heavy metals such as copper, lead, zinc and cadmium. The level of bioaccumulation of studied materials was found to be higher in the crabs in Noyyal river than the tributary Chinnar. Another reason for pollution is the huge concentration of textile units in Tiruppur releasing industrial effluents into the river.. Despite several litigation and court orders, which ordered the closure of such units, the river continues to be polluted. The Government of Tamil Nadu announced a project to prevent pollution in July 2018. Alkalinity in the river is more than the permissible amount for drinking water fixed by the Bureau of Indian standards. In Coimbatore, the Noyyal river transformed into a "frothing disaster". Several projects have been undertaken to restore groundwater level even after the implementation of Zero Liquid Discharge
