= Place names in India =

Place names in India are usually in Indian languages. Other languages include Portuguese, Dutch, English and Arabic.

Since Indian Independence, several Indian cities have adopted pre-English names, most notably Chennai (formerly Madras), Mumbai (formerly Bombay), Kolkata (formerly Calcutta), Bengaluru (formerly Bangalore), Visakhapatnam (formerly Waltair), and Pune (formerly Poona).

== Common place names ==
Most place name suffixes denote after prominent geographical features, such as rivers and lakes. Others are named after personalities such as kings or historical figures. Although Hindu history was a main influence, Islamic and Christian influences are present, particularly in central and northern India.

- -abad - "city" - from Persian ābād (آباد)
- -garh - "fort, castle" - Hindi gaṛh (गढ़)
- -nagar, -nagara, -nagaram - "town" - from Sanskrit nagara (नगर)
- -prayag, -prayaga - "confluence" - from Sanskrit prayāga (प्रयाग)
- -pore, -pur, -pura, -puram - "city" - from Sanskrit pura (पुर) Cognate with Ancient Greek πόλις f (pólis) and Lithuanian pilis.
- -pattinam, -pattanam, -patnam - “harbour” - from the Tamil word for sea portal towns
- -kot, -kota, -kote, -kottai - “fort” - from Tamil "*kōṭ-ai"
- -palli, -halli, -palle - "hamlet" - from Proto Dravidian "*paḷ-"
- -oor, -uru, - "village" - from Tamil "*ūr-"

== Anglicized names ==
Some anglicized names have been officially changed to reflect native pre-colonial spellings. The names of the cities, towns, and villages are usually in Indian languages, while most street names carry English names. Examples: Washermanpet, George Town, Chennai

== Variations ==
Certain names have variations in different languages. Oor/Ooru is a common Dravidian name which means a place, also known as Oor in Tamil and Malayalam, whereas it is called Ooru in Telugu and Kannada.

=== Andhra Pradesh and Telangana ===
Common suffixes include, -ooru, -palli, -pudi, -peta, etc.

Suffix	Meaning	Etymology	Examples
-abad	city	Urdu آباد < Persian ـآباد/آباد < Middle Persian ʾp̄ʾt' (ābād, “populous, thriving, prosperous”). < Proto-Iranian *āpāta-, < Proto-Indo-European *peh₂- (“to protect”)	Hyderabad, Secunderabad, Nizamabad
-bagh	town	Urdu باغ ("garden") < Persian باغ bâğ < Middle Persian 𐭡𐭠𐭢 (bāɣ, “garden, orchard”) < Proto-Indo-Iranian *bʰāgá- (“portion, share, allotment”) < Proto-Indo-European *bʰeh₂g- (“to divide, distribute, allot”)	Suryabagh, Nausena Baugh
-cherla	town	Telugu చర్ల (charla "town")	Macherla, Chengicherla
-guda/-gudem/-gudemu	village	Telugu గూడ (gūḍa "village. hamlet") < Telugu గూడెం (gūḍem) గూడెము (gūḍemu)	Tadepalligudem, Galigudem, Dumbriguda
-kot/-kota	fort	Telugu కోట (kōṭa "fort, fortress") < Proto-South-Dravidian *kōṭṭay ("fort, castle).	Samalkot, Kasimkota, Sriharikota
-nagar/-nagaram/-nagaru	town	Telugu నగర్ (nagar), నగరం (nagaraṁ), నగరు (nagaru) < Proto-South-Dravidian *nakar ("town, city").	Karimnagar, Mahabubnagar, Vizianagaram,
-ole/-olu	town	Anglicized Telugu -ole < Telugu ఓలు (ōlu "town") < Old Telugu ప్రోలు (prōlu "city, town")	Ongole, Nidadvolu
-ooru/-oor/-ore/-ur/-uru	village	Anglicized Telugu -ore < Telugu ఊరు (ūru "village") < Proto-Dravidian *ūr ("village, habitation")	Guntur, Nellore, Chittoor, Eluru, Anantapur
-palem/-palemu/-palle/-pallem/-pallemu/-palli	village	Telugu పాలెం (pāleṁ), పాలెము (pālemu), పల్లె (palle), పల్లెం (palleṁ), పల్లెము (pallemu) < Telugu పల్లి (palli "village") పల్లీ (pallī "village") < Proto-Dravidian *paḷḷi ("(small) village")	Maddilapalem, Peddapalli, Madanapalle, Nadimpalle
-patnam/-patnamu	port city	Telugu పట్నం (paṭnaṁ "patnam")	Vishakhapatnam, Machilipatnam, Krishnapatnam
-pedu			Yerpedu
-pudi	village	(Old?) Telugu పుడి (pudi "village")	Kuchipudi
-pur/-puram/-puramu/-puri	city	Telugu పూర్ (pūr) పూరం (pūraṁ) పూరము (pūramu) పూరి (pūri) < Sanskrit पुर (pura) < Proto-Indo-European *pl̥h₁- (“stronghold”)	Markapur, Hindpur, Atchutapuram
-put/-puttu	village	Telugu పుట్టు (puṭṭu "village, put") < Proto-Dravidian (?)	Manchingiput, Jalaput,
-seema	region	Telugu సీమ (sīma "region, kingdom") < Sanskrit सीमा (sīmā "border, region")	Konaseema, Rayalaseema
-vada/-wada	area, place	Telugu వాడ (vāḍa "area, place")	Vijayawada, Vemulawada
-vaka/-waka	town	Telugu వాక (vāka "town")	Gajuwaka, Hanumanthavaka
-valasa	town	Telugu వలస (valasa "town, migration")	Thangarapuvalasa, Palavalasa

=== Arunachal Pradesh ===
Namdapha National park, Roing, Tezu, Sakteng Wildlife sanctuary, Namsai, Parsurum Kund, Bhairabkunda, Khonsa, Jairampur, Bhismaknagar, Changlang, Hawai, Nampong, Koloriang, etc.

=== Assam ===
Suffix	Meaning	Etymology	Examples
-gā̃o	village	Sanskrit (ग्राम, grāma)	Bongaigaon, Chaygaon, Morigaon, Nagaon
-hāṭ/hāṭī	market	Sanskrit (हाट, hāṭa)	Guwahati, Jorhat, Moranhat
-pāṛā	neighbourhood	Sanskrit (पद्र, padra)	Bilasipara, Goalpara, Rangapara
-pur	settlement	Sanskrit (पुर, pura)	Badarpur, North Lakhimpur, Tamulpur, Tezpur

=== Gujarat ===
Common suffixes
Suffix	Examples
-padra	Vaṭapadra, Vaḍapadra
-vadra	Jaravadra, Phalavadra
-pallī/-pallīkā	Ābhīrapallī, Āśāpallī
-valī/-valli/-vallikā	Kacchāvalī
-sthalī	
-hrada	
-draha	Vaṭa-draha
-sara	Jaṁbu-sara
-pāṭaka	Aṇahila-pāṭaka
-vāṭaka	
-ijya/-ijja	Avayānijya,, Karkijja
-vasaṇa	Caṇḍāvasaṇa
-vasahikā/-vāsaka	
-vāḍā	Ādhivāḍā
-vaḍa	
-pura/-purī/-nagara/-paṭṭana	Ānandapura, Nāndipurī, Girinagara
-siddhi/-sāḍhi	

=== Karnataka ===
Common endings are Ooru, Palaya, Halli, Pete, Seeme. Less common are prefixes such as Sri.

Suffix	meaning	Common place names
Bhavi	well	Arabhavi, Sulibhavi, Bilebhavi, Nagarbhavi, Thondebhavi
Gud	habitation	Nanjangud, Handigud
Halli	village	Kanchamaranahalli, Arehalli
Keri	colony	Madikeri, Tallikeri
Kote	fort	Bagalakote, Jangamakote
Ooru/uru	village	Bengaluru, Mysuru, Mangaluru, Chikkamagaluru, Kitturu. Emmiganuru,
Pete	town	Chikkupete, Hosapete
Nagara	town	Vijayanagara, Jayaprakashanagara
Pura	city	Kundapura, Narasimharajapura, Kanakapura

=== Kerala ===
Common suffixes include Angadi, Athani, Ur, Cheri/Shery, Kulam, Kad, Nad, Pally, Kode/Code, Kara, Mangalam, Kal, Puram, Kunnu, Parambu/Paramba and Puzha.

Suffix	Meaning	Common place names
Ur	Shire	Nilambur, Tirur, Thrissur, Kannur, North Paravur.
Cheri/Shery	Street	Thalassery, Cherpulassery, Kalpakanchery, Manjeri, Thamarassery, Kozhenchery.
Nad	Village	Eranad, Kuttanad, Wayanad, Thondernad.
Kulam	Pond	Ernakulam, Kunnamkulam, Kayamkulam, Mararikulam, Mankulam, Unnikulam, Punnayurkulam, Muthukulam.
Angadi	Market Street	Parappanangadi, Tirurangadi, Pazhavangadi, Melangadi.-
Athani	Porter's rest	Athani, Puthanathani, Karinkallathani
Kad	Forest	Puthukkad, Purakkad, Thalakkad, Palakkad, Vadakkekad.
Kunnu	Hill	Kottakkunnu, Vallikkunnu, Konathukunnu, Kudappanakunnu, Pulinkunnoo.
Parambu/Paramba	Ground/Plot	Thaliparamba, Koothuparamba, Madathiparambu, Kizhuparamba, Thunchan Parambu.
Puzha	River	Alappuzha, Muvattupuzha, Thodupuzha, Cherupuzha, Noolpuzha.

- Kode/Code - Kozhikode, Puthucode, Alamcode, Areekode, Veliyankode.
- Kara - Mavelikkara, Edakkara, Mullurkara, Anakkara, Ramanattukara.
- Mangalam - Kunnamangalam, Chathamangalam, Kunhimangalam, Chendamangalam, Enadimangalam,

Chadayamangalam,

- Pally - Karthikappally, Puthuppally, Kanjirappally, Vadanappally, Pulpally.
- Kal - Kottakkal, Chirakkal, Pothukal, Pulikkal, Edamulackal.
- Puram - Thiruvananthapuram, Malappuram, Angadipuram, Sivapuram, Kadampazhipuram.

=== Maharashtra ===
Common suffixes include Pur, Ner, Gav, Abad, Khed, Oli, Wadi, Nagar, Tur, Vali, and Ra.

- Pur - Nagpur, Solapur, Chandrapur, Kolhapur, Badlapur, Achalpur, Ballarpur, Pandharpur, Malkapur, Indapur, Jaysinghpur, Tulijapur, Murtijapur, Shirpur, Shirampur
- Ner - Sangamner, Jamner, Parner, Amalner, Saoner, Ner
- Gaon - Jalgaon, Malegaon, Khamgaon, Kopargaon, Tasgaon, Majalgaon, Shegaon, Koregaon, Varangaon, Chalisgaon
- Abad - Aurangabad, Osmanabad, Khultabad, Dharmabad, Daulatabad
- Khed - Sindkhed, Jamkhed, Mudkhed, Narkhed, Gangakhed, Umarkhed
- Oli - Gadchiroli, Hingoli, Dapoli, Saoli, Sakoli, Wagholi, Biloli, Khopoli, Padoli
- Wadi - Hinjawadi, Vaibhavwadi, Kurduwadi, Sanaswadi, Sawantwadi, Wadi, Yewalewadi, Ghulewadi, Darewadi
- Nagar - Ahmednagar, Rajgurunagar, Ulhasnagar, Urjanagar, Shivajinagar
- Tur - Latur, Patur, Partur, Jintur
- Vali - Borivali, Kandivali, Karivali
- Ra - Bhandara, Rajura, Nandura

=== Orissa ===
In Odisha (formerly known as Orissa) common suffixes are Pur, Garh, Gada.

Suffix	Meaning	Common Place names
Pur	City	Sambalpur, Berhampur, Rairangpur, Subarnapur, Puri
Garh	Fort	Bargarh, Debagarh, Sundergarh, Nayagarh

=== Tamil Nadu ===
In Tamil Nadu, common suffixes are Oor, Nagaram, Puram, Kudi, Cheri, Paakkam, Pattinam, Palayam, Kaadu, Pettai, Mangalam, Seemai, Naththam, Palli and Kuppam. One common prefix is Thiru. The majority of names are in Tamil language. Telugu and Kannada place names can be seen in border areas. Sanskrit names are found because of the historical relationship of Sanskrit with Hinduism.

Suffix	Meaning	Common Place names
Oor/ur/ore	Village	Ambattur, Thanjavur, Karur, Hosur, Tirupur, Coimbatore, Vellore.
Kaadu	Forest	Yercaud,
Pattinam	Coastal area	Nagapattinam
Patti	Village	Kovilpatti, Andipatti,
Palli	Jain Temple	Thiruchirapalli
Puram	ectal	Kanchipuram, Ramanathapuram, Viluppuram
Nagaram	City	Vanagaram
Ni	bee	Theni
Kal	paving stone	Namakkal
Kudi	settlement	Karaikkudi, Paramakudi, Thoothukkudi
Palayam	Camp	Gobichettypalayam, Mettupalayam
Madai	Lock	Karamadai, Ettimadai, Kallimadai
Odai/Odu	River	Erode, Chithode
Thurai	settlement	Alandurai, Perundhurai, Sengathurai
Adam	settlement	Ukkadam, Palladam, Kundadam
Mutthur	Pearl City	Thondamuthur, Kuniyamuthur
Pudur	New Town	Ondipudur, Kovaipudur
Nallur	Good Town	Singanallur, Sholinganallur
Kadavu	Pass	Kinathukadavu, Manakadavu
Kurichi	valley	Kallakurichi, Modakurichi
Medu	Upper city	Kasimedu
Pettai	Town	Udumalpet, Parangipettai
kodu	line	Thiruchengodu
Pakkam/Vakkam	Portcity	Valasaravakkam, Madipakkam
Padi	Settlement	Vysarpadi, Tharangambadi,
Koil	Temple	Vellakoil, Nagarkoil
Kottai	Palace	Pudukottai, Gandarvakottai, Pattukottai
Chery/Serry	Coastal town	Pondicherry, Velacherry
Giri	Hill	Krishnagiri, Nilagiri
Kulam	Pound	Vilathikulam, Sathankulam
Mangalam	Settlement	Sathyamangalam
Samudram	Settlements	Ambasamudram, Balasamudram

=== Tripura ===
Common suffix include -mura.

suffix	meaning	common places
assa		Ambassa, Bagbassa
bari	house	Churaibari, Jolaibari
chhara	stream	Laxmanchhara, Nabinchhara, Karaichhara, Bagaichhara, Dhanichhara, Sanichhara
mura		Teliamura, Sonamura
pur		Udaipur, Amarpur, Madhupur,
nagar	town or city	Ampinagar, Dharmanagar, Jubarajnagar

=== West Bengal ===
Common suffix include -mura.

suffix	meaning	common places
abad		Murshidabad
bari	house	Churaibari, Jolaibari
tala		Maheshtala, Taratala
pur		Durgapur
nagar	town or city	Bidhannagar

== Global Indian influence in place names ==
In the Indianised cultures outside India, places were given Sanskritised names to make them sound more noble. Examples include:

- Ayutthaya in Thailand, named after Ayodhya, Rama's hometown.
- Bandar Seri Begawan, the capital of Brunei, named after "bhagavān", a title for gods. "Seri Begawan" was used as a title for Sultan Omar Ali Saifuddien III after he abdicated from the throne.
- Jayapura in Papua, Indonesia named from two Sanskrit words Jaya meaning "victorious" and Pura meaning "town". The name was given by the first president and founding father of the country, Sukarno.
- Yogyakarta in Java, Indonesia named after the city of Ayodhya in India, the hometown of Sri Rama. "Yogyakarta" means "fit to prosper".
- Siak Sri Indrapura in Sumatra, Indonesia named after the disbanded Sultanate of Siak Sri Indrapura. "Indrapura" means "town of Indra".
- Nakhon Si Thammarat in Thailand, from the Pali words "nagara srī dhammaraja", or "city of the lord and king who rules by dharma".
- Putrajaya in Malaysia, which means "victorious prince" or "victorious son".
- Singapura, which means "lion city" named by prince Parameswara from Palembang, South Sumatra present Indonesia

=== Indonesia ===
Indonesia, as a hugely Sanskrit and Indic-influenced country, contains many Sanskrit-named cities and placements:

- kota - "city", from Tamil kōṭṭam (கோட்டம், "town") — e.g. Kota Pinang, Lima Puluh Kota Regency, Kotabumi, Kotabaru, Kotamobagu, Kotawaringin, etc.
- negara - "state", from Sanskrit नगर (nagara) means "country" in Indonesian. The word Nagari is also a term used in West Sumatra referring to "village".
- pura - "town", from Sanskrit पुर (pur) — e.g. Jayapura, Siak Sri Indrapura, Amlapura, Sangkapura, Semarapura, etc. In Indonesia, pura also refers to a Hindu temple.

=== Malaysia ===
- kota - "city", from Tamil kōṭṭam (கோட்டம், "town")
- negeri - "state" or "country", from Sanskrit nagarī (नगरी, "city")

=== Myanmar (Burma) ===
- pura (ပူရ) - "city", from Pali pura (ibid.)
- thamokdaya (သမုဒ္ဒရာ) - "ocean", from Sanskrit samudra (ibid.)
- thiri (သီရိ) - "splendour", from Pali siri (ibid.)
- wadi (ဝတီ) - "endowed with," from Pali vatī (ibid.)

=== Thailand ===
- nakhon (นคร) [ná(ʔ).kʰɔ̄ːn] - "city"
- buri (บุรี) [bū.rīː] - "town"
- samut (สมุทร) [sàmùt] - "sea"
- si (ศรี) [sǐ] - "lord"

== See also ==
- Renaming of cities in India
- List of Indian cities on rivers
- Oikonyms in West and South Asia
