= Karamadai Block =

Karamadai block is a revenue block of Coimbatore district of the Indian state of Tamil Nadu. This revenue block consist of 17 panchayat villages.

== List of Panchayat Villages ==
They are,

SI.No	Panchayat Village
1	Bellathi
2	Bellepalayam
3	Chikkadasampalayam
4	Chikkarampalayam
5	Chinnakallipatti
6	Illuppanatham
7	Irumborai
8	Jadayampalayam
9	Kalampalayam
10	Kemmarampalayam
11	Marudur
12	Mooduthurai
13	Nellithurai
14	Odanthurai
15	Thekkampatti
16	Tholampalayam
17	Velliangadu
