= Jadayampalayam Pudur =

Coordinates: 11.2929991°N 76.9494865°E

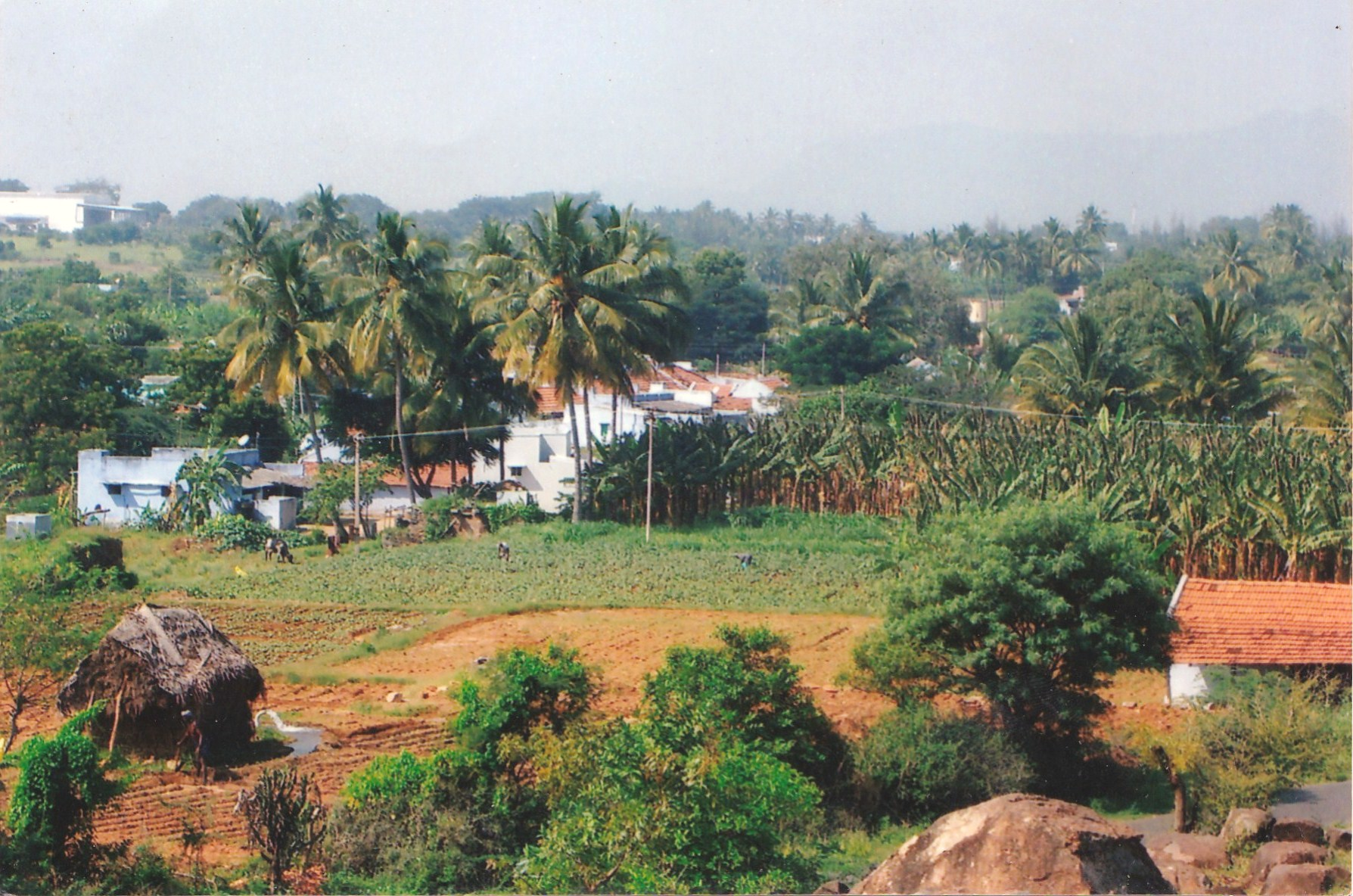

Jadayampalayam Pudur is a small village, located 4 km from Mettupalayam town, on Mettupalayam-Tirupur state highway 80. The village become very famous because of its residential development. A major landmark is a small hillock popularly known in Kannada (spoken by majority of people in this village) as "Kallal Mokke" meaning "mound made of stones". There is an abandoned stone quarry which is always with water even in dry season attracting birds and insects. It is a great spot for watching birds with some rare birds being spotted in this surrounding. The famous Tamil movie Aattukkara Alamelu was partially filmed here

== Transportation ==
TNSTC Bus (Number 19) goes through Jadayampalayam Pudur. Taxi/Auto services are available from Mettupalayam, Sirumugai and Karamadai.

== Airport ==
Coimbatore (Manchester of South India) is 38 km by road from Jadayampalayam Pudur. The nearest airport is Coimbatore International Airport which has regular (Air timings) flights from New Delhi, Kolkata, Mumbai, Ahmedabad, Bangalore, Calicut, Chennai, Cochin, Hyderabad, Thiruvananthapuram, Jammu, Pune, Bangkok, Kuala Lumpur, Bahrain, Kuwait, Muscat, Sharjah, Abu Dhabi, Colombo, Dubai, Doha, Singapore, etc.

== Railway station ==
Mettupalayam railway station is the nearest railway station. Blue mountain or Nilgiri Express, super past train, goes chennai daily. Mettupalayam passenger train connects Coimbatore City junction.
