= Kurumbanur (Mettupalayam) =

Kurumbanur (Mettupalayam) குரும்பனூர்
- Village
- Interactive map of Kurumbanur (Mettupalayam)
- Coordinates: 11.280187°N 76.927458°E
- Country: India
- State: Tamil Nadu
- Region: Mettupalayam Taluk
- District: Coimbatore
- Time zone: +5.30GMT
- PIN: 641305

Kurumbanur (also spelled Kurambanoor) is an agricultural village located in the outskirts of Mettupalayam in the Coimbatore district of Tamil Nadu. Located in the foothills of Nilgiri hills, this village forms a part of transitional landscape between Coimbatore plain and the Western Ghats mountain ranges.

== Location ==
Kurumbanur is approximately 3.7 km from the city centre of Mettupalayam. It lies about 36 km north of Coimbatore and approximately 55 km southeast of ooty making it the one of the settlements along the route to the Nilgiri mountains. The village is well connected by road via regional highways network. The nearest railway station is Mettupalayam railway station, which is located 4 km away from the village. The nearest airport is Coimbatore International Airport, which is around 37 km from village, serving both regional and international destinations.

== Nearby Attraction ==
Kurumbanur is approximately 2–4 km from the Black Thunder Water Theme Park, one of Tamil Nadu's largest theme parks situated on Mettupalayam-Ooty road.

== See also ==
- Mettupalayam
- Black Thunder
