= Kembanur =

- village
- Location in Tamil Nadu, India Kembanur (India)
- Coordinates: 11.24263°N 76.90045°E
- Country: India
- State: Tamil Nadu
- District: Coimbatore

Government
  - Type: Panchayati raj (India)
  - Body: Gram panchayat

Languages
  - Official: Tamil
- Time zone: UTC+5:30 (IST)
- PIN: 641104
- STD Code: +91-4254
- Vehicle registration: TN-40

Kembanur is a small village which is located in Marudur panchayat next to Coimbatore city, Tamil Nadu, India. It is located near Mettupalayam. The Pin code of Kembanur is 641104 and postal head office is Karamadai. Cities close to Kembanur include Coonoor, Coimbatore, Udhagamandalam and Sathyamangalam.

== Demographics of Kembanur ==
The local languages are Tamil and English.
