= Geography of Coimbatore =

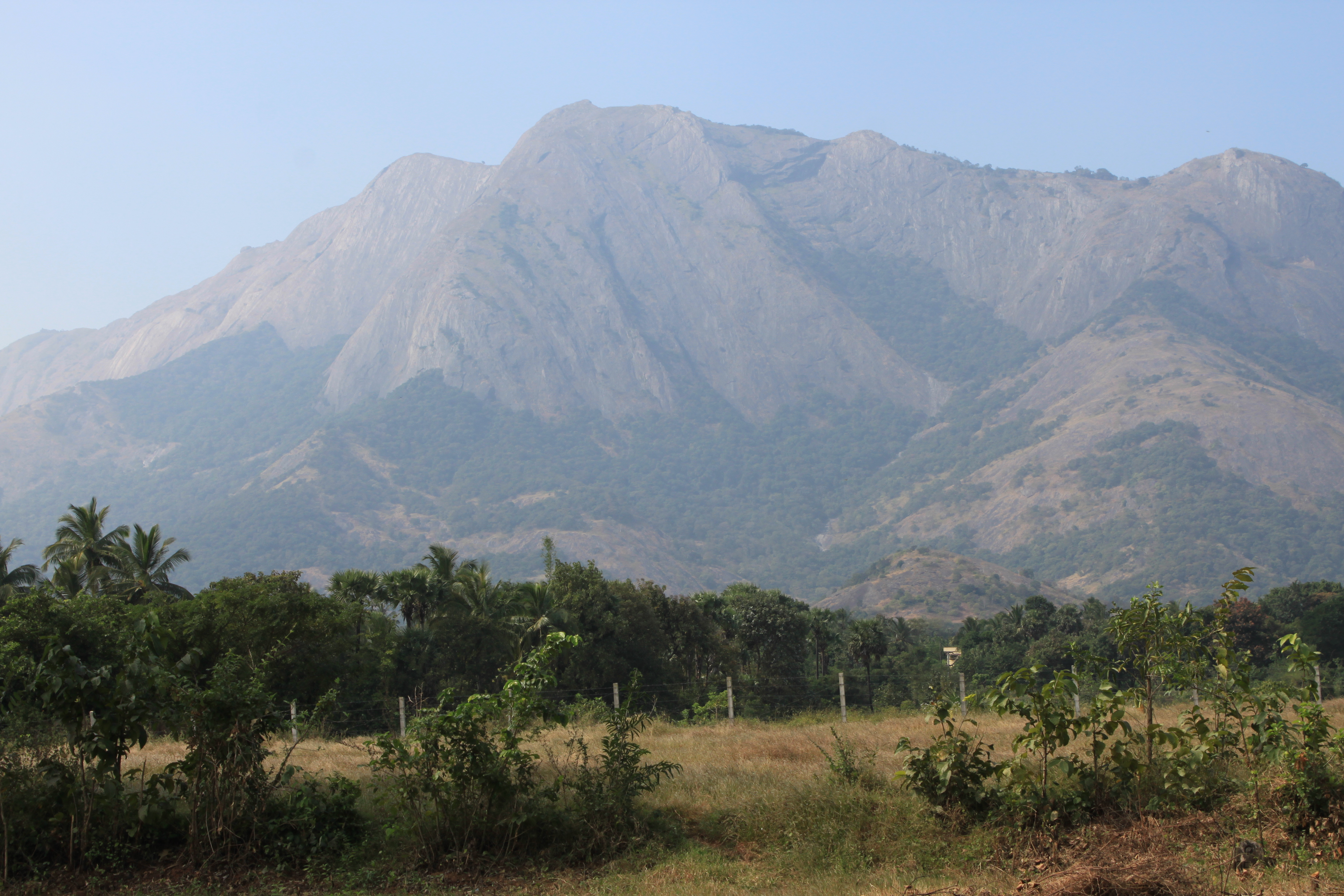
The Western Ghats along the Palakad-Coimbatore National Highway

Coimbatore is the second largest city in the Indian state of Tamil Nadu. It is situated in the western corner of Tamil Nadu, a short distance from the border with the neighbouring state of Kerala, and is surrounded by the Western Ghats on all sides.

== Location ==
Coimbatore is located at 11.0161°N 76.971°E. The city is at a distance of 490 kilometres (300 mi) south-west of Chennai, 190 kilometres (120 mi) south of Mysore, 330 kilometres (210 mi) south of Bangalore. The border with Kerala is just 25 kilometres (16 mi) from Coimbatore.

== Physical features ==
It is surrounded by the Western Ghats mountain range on the West and North, with reserve forests (and the Nilgiri Biosphere Reserve) on the northern side. The Noyyal River runs through Coimbatore and forms the southern boundary of the corporation. The city sits amidst Noyyal's basin area and has an extensive tank system fed by the river and rainwater. The eight major tanks / wetland areas of Coimbatore are Singanallur, Valankulam, Ukkadam Periyakulam, Selvampathy, Narasampathi, Krishnampathi, Selvachinthamani and Kumaraswami tanks. Sanganur pallam, Kovilmedu pallam, Vilankurichi-Singanallur Pallam, Karperayan Koil pallam, Railway feeder roadside drain, Trichy-Singanallur Check drain and Sanganoor pallam are some of the streams that drain the city.

Kousika River starts from Kurudi Hill in Coimbatore. Bhavani River (approx. 20 km) and Noyyal River run north and south of Kousika River.

The eastern side of the Coimbatore district, including the city, is predominantly dry. A western pass to Kerala, popularly referred to as the Palghat Gap, provides its boundary.

== Coimbatore Forest Division ==
Coimbatore district is richly endowed with hills, forests, rivers and wildlife. The Western Ghats of the district are the home of rivers such as Bhavani, Noyyal River, Aliyar, Siruvani which provide the drinking water and irrigation water for the people and farmers of Coimbatore. The forests of Coimbatore district spread over an area of 693.48 km^{2} against district area of 7433.72 km^{2}. The forests are responsible for the cool weather, the green landscape and clean air of the district. The forest tract falls between 10°37’ and 11°31’ North latitudes and 76°39’ and 77°5’ East longitudes. The greater part of the Coimbatore forest division is situated in southward extending Western Ghats, with the North-western parts forming the lower Ranges of the Nilgiris. The Coimbatore forest division is part of the Nilgiri Biosphere Reserve (NBR) and also forms part of the Core Zone of the NBR.

The forest of Coimbatore are administered by two forest divisions. South of Palghat Gap lies the Anamalai Wildlife Sanctuary, which has been designated as Tiger Reserve during 2008. North of Palghat lies the Coimbatore forest division.. This division is bounded on the North and North West by Sathiyamangalam, Erode, Nilgiris North and Nilgiris South Forest Divisions, and on the west and South-west by Palghat Forest division of Kerala State.

The Coimbatore Forest Division maybe broadly divided into following segments based on geographical variance.

- The Nilgiris Slopes Reserved Forests
- Plain Forests around Mettupalayam
- The Velliangadu Valley
- The Naickenpalayam Valley.
- The Thadagam Valley
- The Bolampatty Valley
- The Walayar Valley.

== Fauna ==
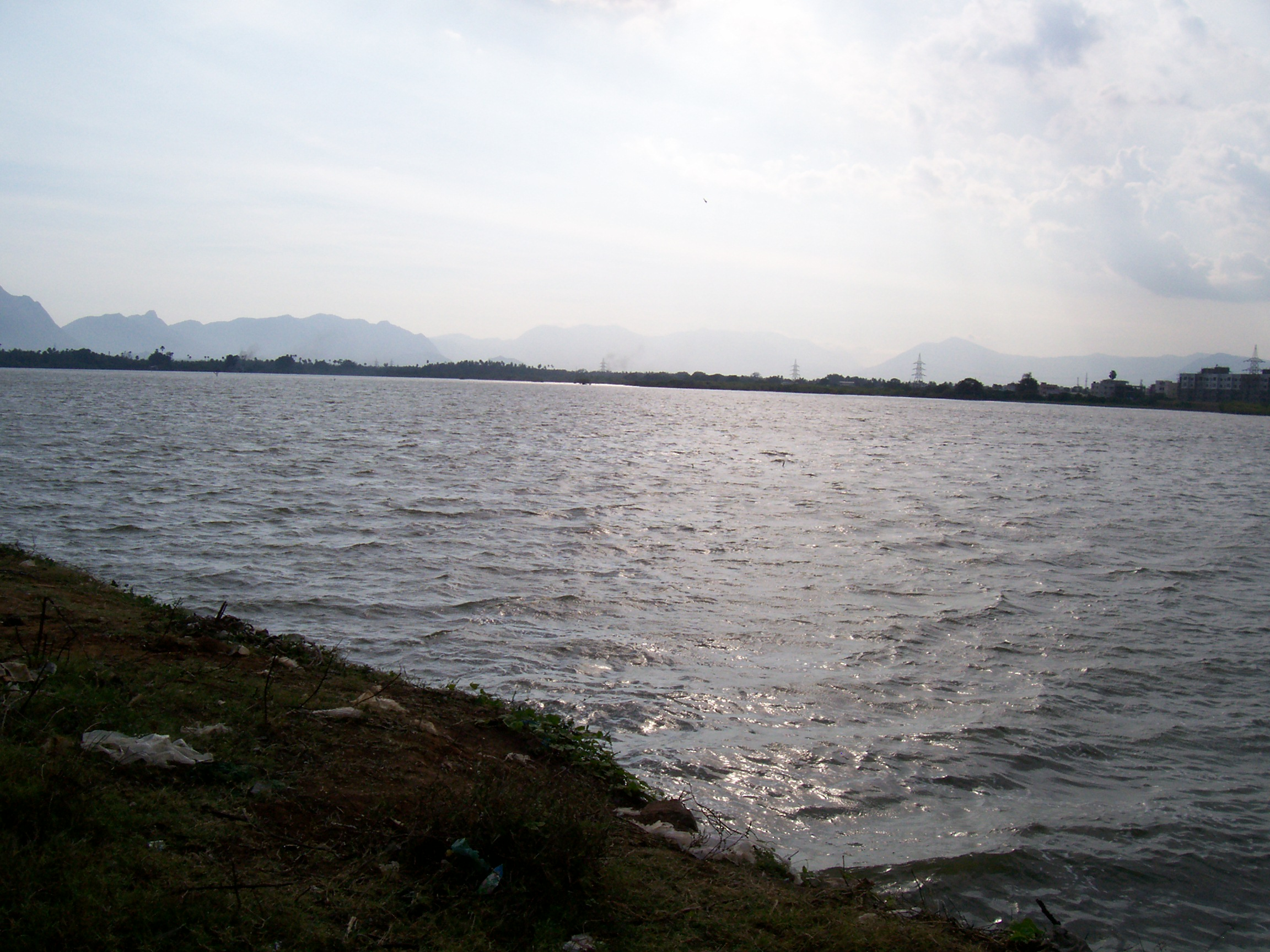
Ukkadam Biglake

Because of its close proximity to the Western Ghats, the district is rich in fauna. The Coimbatore urban wetlands harbours around 116 species of birds. Of these, 66 are resident, 17 are migratory and 33 are local migrants. Spot-billed Pelican, Painted Stork, Open Billed Stork, Ibis, Spot-billed Duck, Teal, Black Winged Stilt are some of the migratory birds that visit Coimbatore wetlands regularly.

== Flora ==
The Nilgiris slope of the Mettupalayam range is rich in sandalwood trees and bamboo. They vary from rich tropical evergreen forests of Punachi range to jungles of shrubs in southern ranges. Apart from the high altitude regions of Western Ghats, most of the forest area has come under Lantana invasion. The locals refer to it as Siriki Chedi.
