= Naduvilathani =

Village in Palakkad District, Kerala, India

Naduvilathani is a small village located in Malappuram and Palakkad Districts in Kerala. It is located between the villages of Poovathani and Karinkallathani, which is how it received its name. It is located about 600 meters away from Karinkallathani and the NH213.
