= N. Sunil Anand =

Indian politician (born 1973)

Member of the Tamil Nadu Legislative Assembly
- Incumbent
- Assumed office 11 May 2026
- Preceded by: A. K. Selvaraj
- Constituency: Mettupalayam

Personal details
- Party: Tamilaga Vettri Kazhagam

Nagarajan Sunil Anand (born 1973) is an Indian politician from Tamil Nadu. He is a member of the Tamil Nadu Legislative Assembly from the Mettupalayam Assembly constituency in Coimbatore district, representing the Tamilaga Vettri Kazhagam.

== Early life and education ==
Anand is from Mettupalayam, Coimbatore district, Tamil Nadu. He is the son of Nagarajan. He is self employed. He completed his Class 10 at Mahajana Higher Secondary School, Mettupalayam in 1990 and dropped out of the same school while in Class 11 in 1991. He declared assets worth Rs.31 crores in his affidavit to the Election Commission of India. He had no criminal cases recorded against him. His ancestors, originally from Karnataka, settled in Tamil Nadu and he is the only Kannadiga in the Tamil Nadu Assembly. BC Lingaiah, his maternal grandfather, was a former mayor of Mysuru.

== Career ==
Anand won the Mettupalayam Assembly constituency representing the Tamilaga Vettri Kazhagam in the 2026 Tamil Nadu Legislative Assembly election. He polled 75,564 votes and defeated his nearest rival, S. M. T. Kavitha Kalyanasundaram of the Dravida Munnetra Kazhagam, by a margin of 7,768 votes.
