= Nanjundeswarar Temple, Karamadai =

Nanjundeswarar Temple
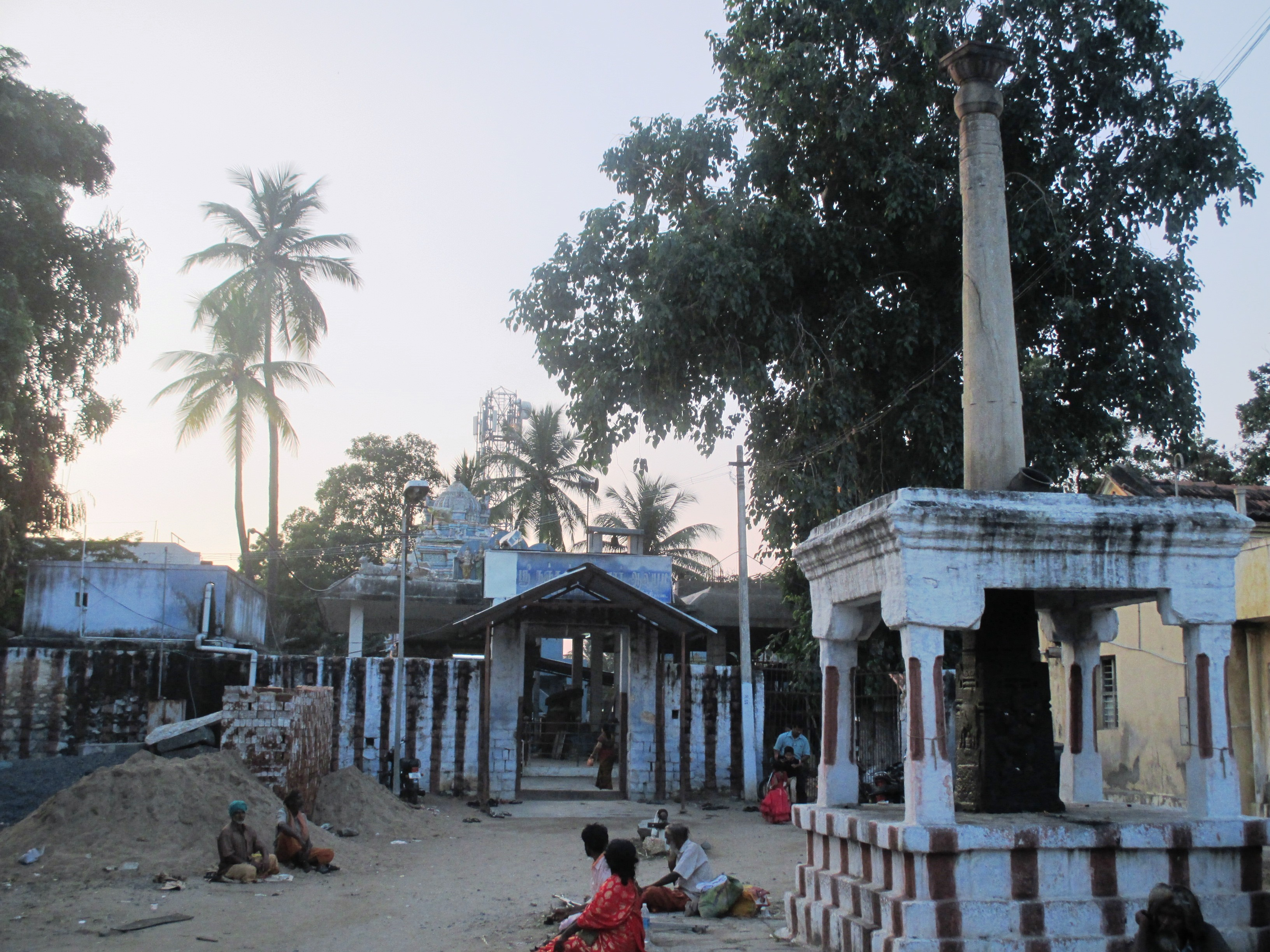

- Location in Tamil Nadu

Religion
- Affiliation: Hinduism
- District: Coimbatore
- Deity: Nanjundeswarar(Shiva) Ulaganayagi (Parvathi)

Location
- Location: Karamadai
- State: Tamil Nadu
- Country: India
- Coordinates: 11°14′31″N 76°57′36″E

Architecture
- Type: Dravidian architecture

Nanjundeswarar Temple is a temple dedicated to the Hindu god Shiva in Karamadai, a village in Coimbatore district in the South Indian state of Tamil Nadu, It is located 96 km from Erode. Constructed in the Dravidian style of architecture, the temple is believed to have been built during the 16th century CE. In this temple, Shiva is worshipped as Nanjundeswarar and his consort Parvathi as Ulaganayagi.

The temple is open from 6 am – 12 pm and 4–8:30 pm on all days except during new moon days when it is open the full day. Four daily rituals and three yearly festivals are held at the temple, of which the Shivaratri festival during the Tamil month of Vaiakasi (May–June) and Annabishekam in Aippasi (October–November) being the most prominent. The temple is maintained and administered by the Hindu Religious and Endowment Board of the Government of Tamil Nadu.

== Legend and history ==
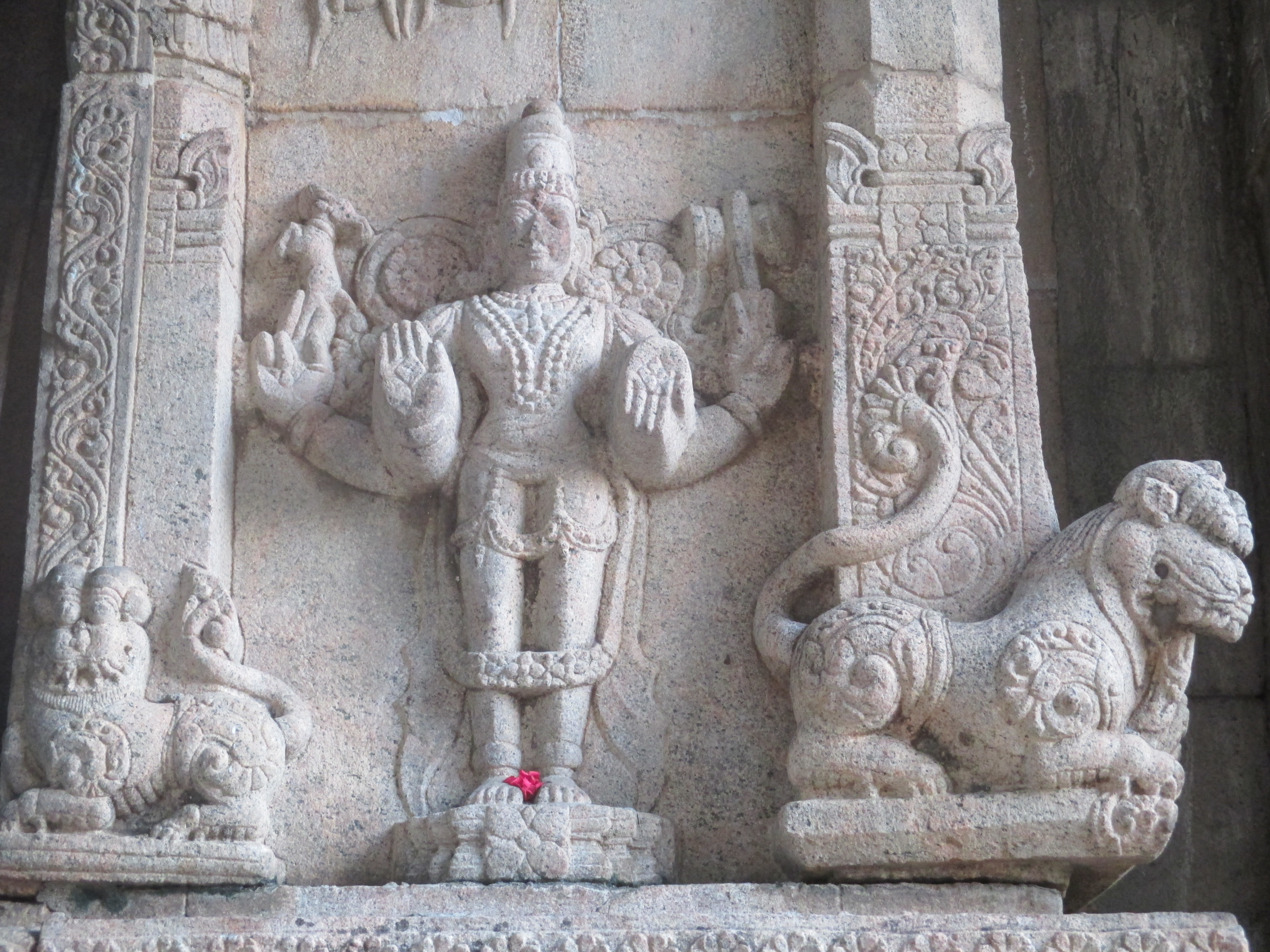
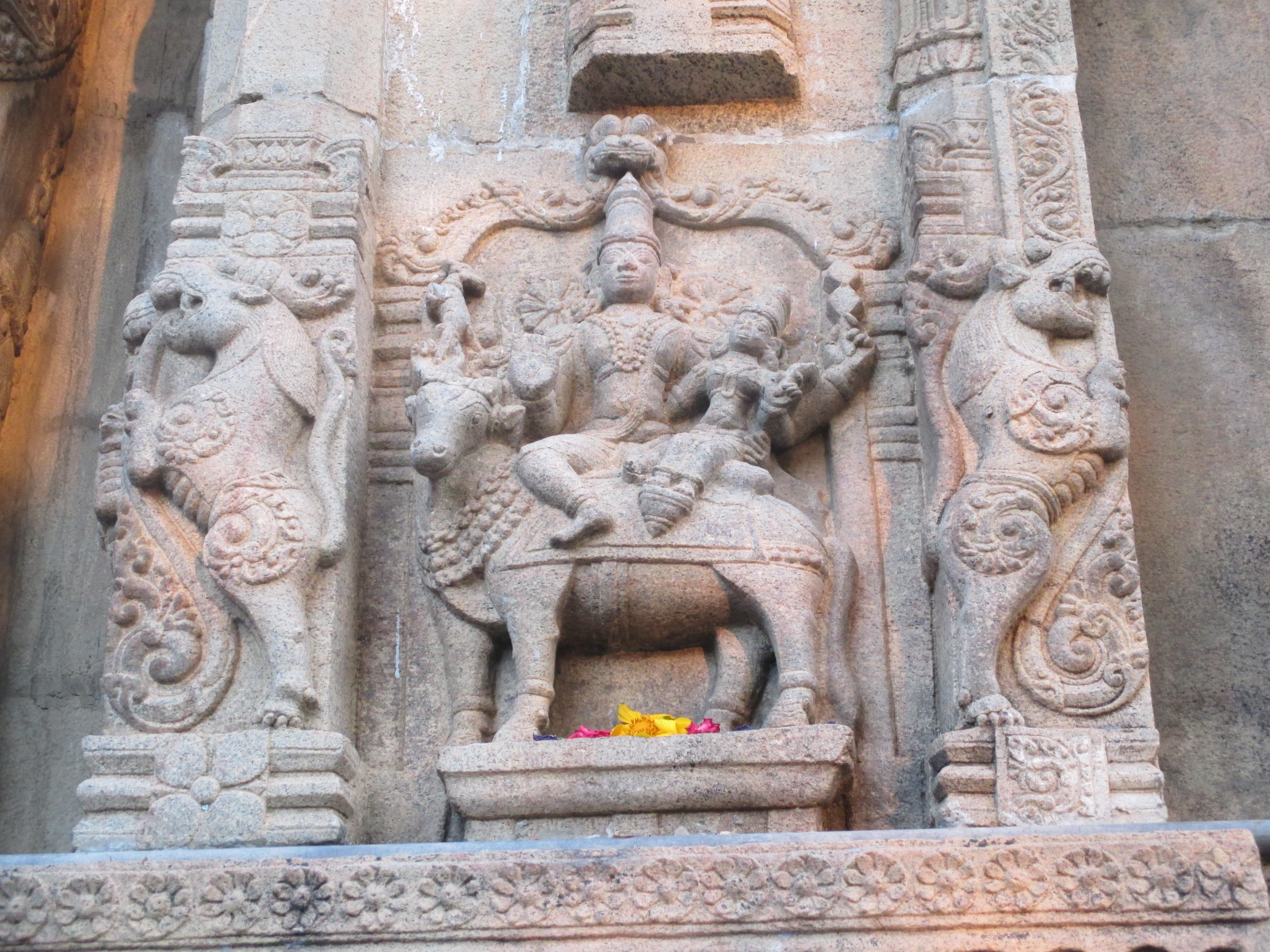
Design of Vishnu and Vrishaparudar

As per another legend, there was a fight between the Devas and Asuras (demon) during the churning of Ocean of Milk for Amrita, the ambrosia. Asuras were able to overpower Devas at one point of time and the Devas sought the rescue from Vishnu. Vishnu appeared as Mohini to lure the asuras and gave them empty pot. While churning the ocean of milk, there were a lot of divine elements like Kamadhenu that appeared. During one part of the churning, poisonous gases began to emanate and both the asuras and devas were seeking rescue from Shiva in his abode at Kailasa. Shiva appeared and drank the poison and while gulping the contents, Parvathi grabbed his throat and the poison remained in his throat. Since Shiva drank the poison (called Nanju), he came to be referred as Nanjundeswarar.

While the exact history of the temple could not be ascertained, the copper plate inscriptions in the temple from 1479 indicate grant of village named Poosarpalaym to the Brahmins. The endowment was made by Iswara Deva Raja, the general of Krishnadeva Raya. In modern times, the temple is maintained and administered by the Hindu Religious and Endowment Board of the Government of Tamil Nadu.

== Architecture ==
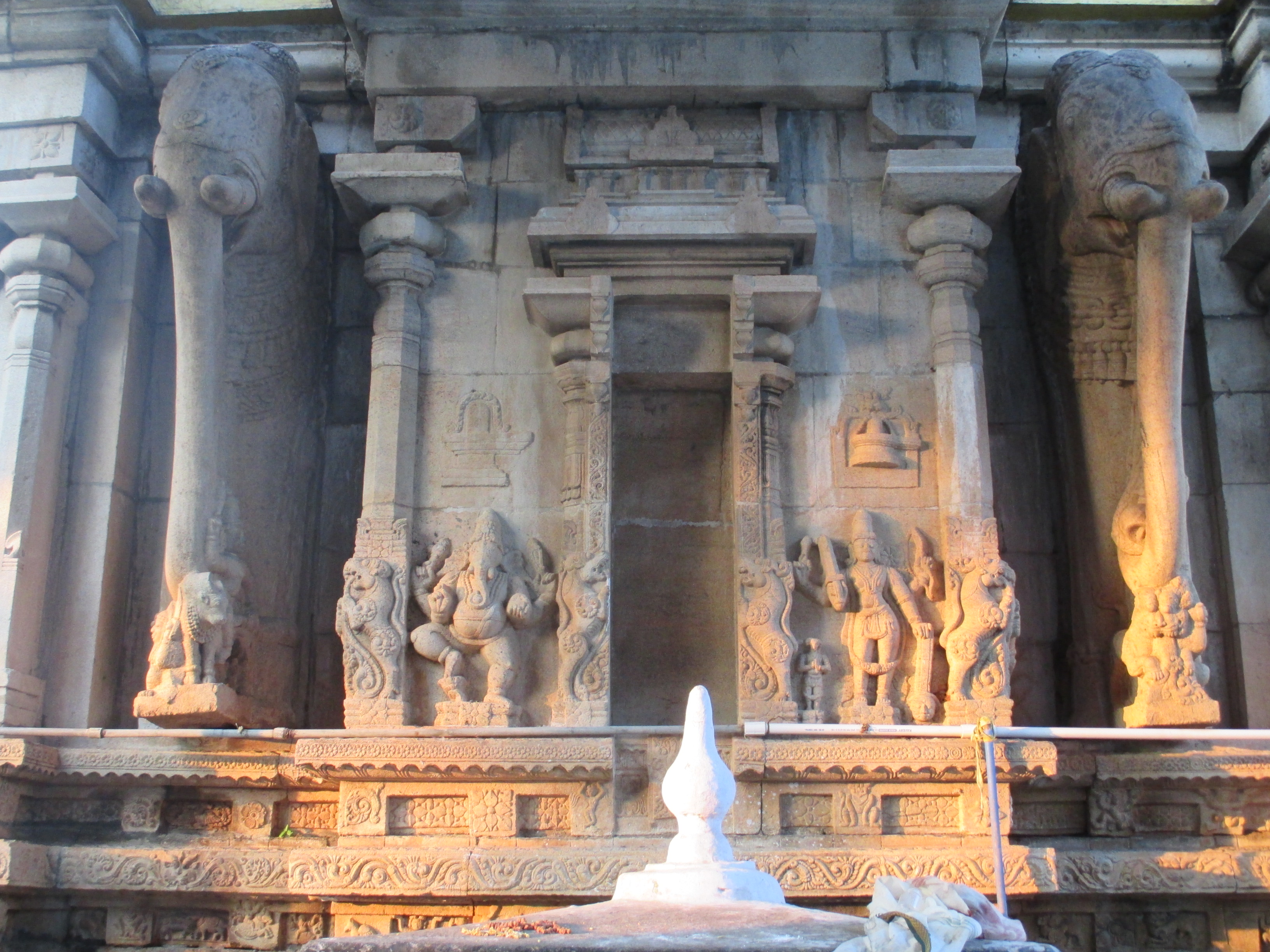
Designs in the walls around the sanctum

A granite wall surrounds the temple, enclosing all its shrines. The temple has a five-tiered rajagopuram, the gateway tower. The sanctum of the temple is believed to have been carved out in a single stone. The image of Nanjundeswarar in the form of Lingam is housed in the sanctum. It is made of granite and appears red in colour. The northern part of the temple houses the image of Ulaganayagi, the consort of Nanjundeswarar. The vimana, the shrine over the sanctum of Nanjundeswarar is similar to the ones in North Indian temples, with a spiral structure. The metal image of Chandrasekara is unique that the full image of Ganga is sculpted unlike the other temples where Shiva is sported with crescent alone. The shrine also houses the images of Vinayaka, Subramanya, Veerabhadra, Rishabandika, Palani Andavar, Mahishasuramardini, Anjaneya and Nataraja on the walls. Shiva in one of the sculptures is portrayed as a hunter, while Parvathi as a dancer. The Vinayaka idol is sported with one of his legs bent, while image of Kali is sported with a dancing posture. There are sculptures depicting Machavallabha emerging out of fish, soldier armed with sword and a goat worshipping Shiva. There are also sculptures of live creatures like cow, goat, elephant, swan, fish, snake, yali, horse, pig, tiger and bull. Similar to the Meenakshi Amman temple, there are six 6 ft (1.8 m) elephants guarding the sanctum of Nanjundeswarar. There are miniature sculptures of Rishabaruda, Balasubramanya, Kali, Brahma and Lakshmi Narayana on both sides of the elephants. The image of Subramanya is sported with twelve arms.

== Festival ==
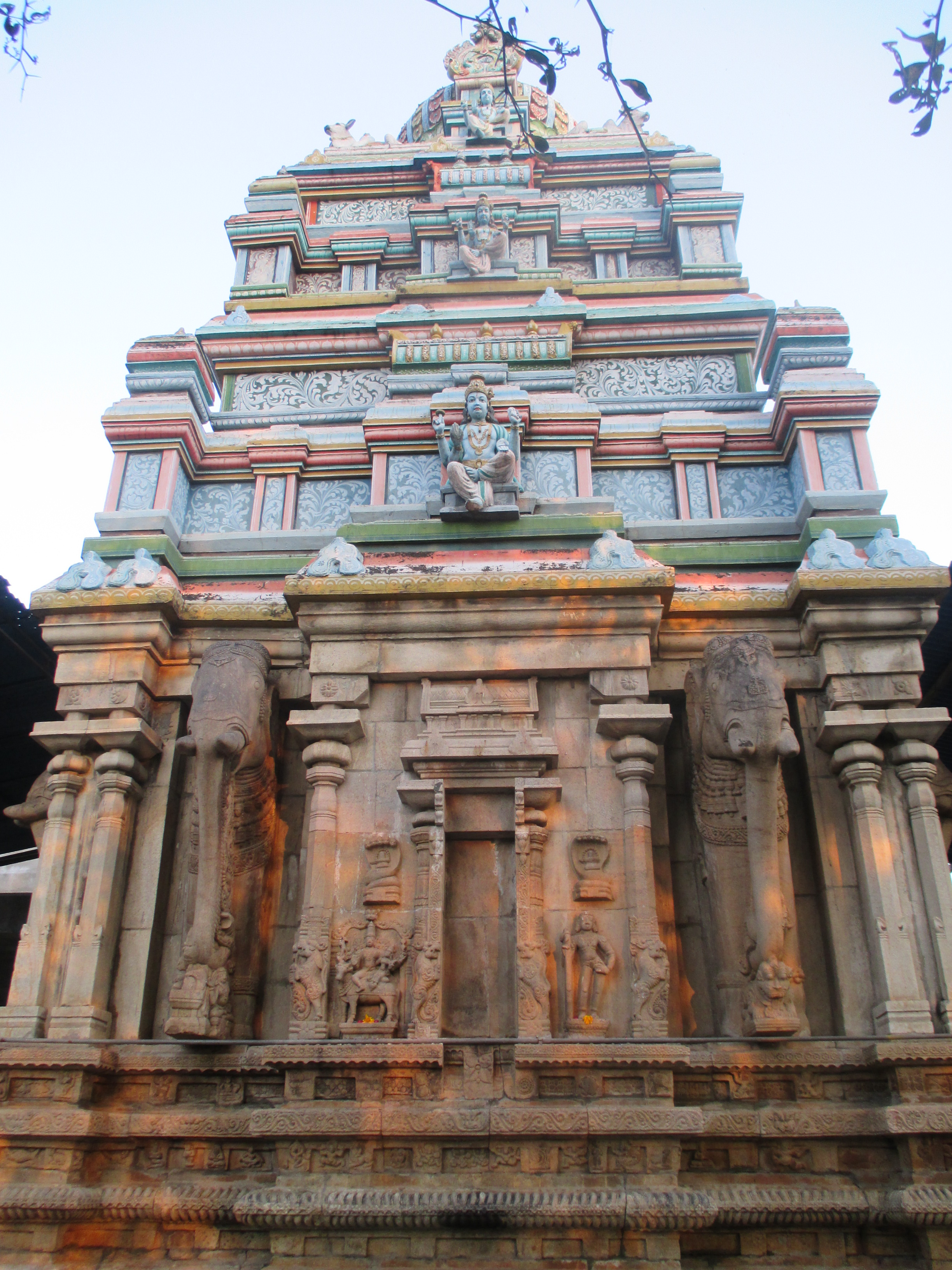
The shrine around the sanctum

The temple follows Saivite tradition. The temple priests perform the pooja (rituals) during festivals and on a daily basis. The temple is open from 6 am – 12 pm and 4-8:30 pm on all days except during new moon days when it is open the full day. The Ranganathaswamy temple is present in the same campus and the water for daily rituals is taken from the same tank for both the temples. During a yearly festival the festival image of Ranganathar is brought to the Nanjundeswarar temple for an event called Ambu yerithal. The Shivaratri festival during the Tamil month of Vaiakasi (May - June) and Annabishekam in Aippasi (October - November) being the most prominent. During the tenth day of Navratri festival, the festival image of Nanjundeswarar (a form of Shiva) and Ranganathaswamy temple, Karamadai (a form of Vishnu) are sported together fighting demons with bow and arrow. The union of Shiva and Vishnu in such a form is one of its kind in Tamil Nadu.
