= O. K. Chinnaraj =

Indian politician

Member of Tamil Nadu Legislative Assembly
- In office 11 May 2006 – 2 May 2021
- Preceded by: A. K. Selvaraj
- Succeeded by: A. K. Selvaraj
- Constituency: Mettupalayam

Personal details
- Born: Mettupalayam, Coimbatore, Tamil Nadu
- Party: All India Anna Dravida Munnetra Kazhagam
- Spouse: Unmarried
- Parent: Krishnaswamy
- Occupation: Politics & Agriculture

O. Krishnaswamy Chinnaraj is an Indian politician. He has won the Tamil Nadu Legislative Assembly elections 2006,2011 and 2016 from the Mettupalayam constituency. Chinnaraj, who is a member of the All India Anna Dravida Munnetra Kazhagam party, was first elected from the Mettupalayam constituency to the Tamil Legislative Assembly in 2006 and was re-elected in the elections of 2011 and 2016.

== Elections contested ==
=== Tamil Nadu Legislative Assembly Election ===
Election	Constituency	Party	Result	Vote %	Opposition Candidate	Opposition Party	Opposition vote %
2006	Mettupalayam	AIADMK	Won	44.50	B. Arunkumar	DMK	44.41
2011	Mettupalayam	AIADMK	Won	54.53	B. Arunkumar	DMK	39.53
2016	Mettupalayam	AIADMK	Won	44.41	S. Surendran	DMK	36.76
