= Moolathurai =

Moolathurai (மூலத்துறை) )
- village
- Location in Tamil Nadu, India Moolathurai (மூலத்துறை) ) (India)
- Coordinates: 11.3214°N 76.9949°E
- Country: India
- State: Tamil Nadu
- District: Coimbatore
- Region: Mettupalayam

Government
  - Type: Block, gram panchayat, Municipality, State constituency.

Population
  - Total: 1,204

Languages
- Postal code: 641302

Moolathurai is a village surrounded by Bhavani River, located near Sirumugai, Coimbatore District. Most of the people living here are engaged in agricultural activities, such as cultivating banana plantations and vegetables. Kora cotton sarees weaved by Kannada speaking hand-loom weavers from this village are very popular and have been recognised by National Awards.

== Transportation ==
A bus facility is available from Mettupalayam, Sirumugai. Taxi/Auto services are also available from Mettupalayam, Sirumugai and Karamadai.

== School ==
Panchayat Union Middle School (PUMS) Moolathurai school was established in 1885 in the Coimbatore district of Tamil Nadu state. Sub Post Office near this area is Sirumugai. The school is approved for Primary, Upper Primary and working under the management of Local Body. The Tamil language is the primary medium of instruction. The school is co-educational i.e. both boys and girls are admitted in an equal manner.

Students from this school are participating in various competition run by television channels, recently the students showcased their talent in Oru varthai oru latcham Junior program which is popular.

== Airport ==
Coimbatore (Manchester of South India) is 50 km by road from Moolathurai. The nearest airport is Coimbatore International Airport which has regular (Air timings) flights from New Delhi, Kolkata, Mumbai, Ahmedabad, Bangalore, Calicut, Chennai, Cochin, Hyderabad, Thiruvananthapuram, Jammu, Pune, Bangkok, Kuala Lumpur, Bahrain, Kuwait, Muscat, Sharjah, Abu Dhabi, Colombo, Dubai, Doha, Singapore, etc. Railway station

Mettupalayam railway station is the nearest railway station. Blue mountain or Nilgiri Express, super past train, goes chennai daily. Mettupalayam passenger train connects Coimbatore City junction. Tourist places

Udagamandalam (Ooty) is located 60 km distant from Moolathurai and can be reached by good bus and train connections.
