= Thirukkural Payanam =

- Genre: Talk; Quiz; Reality
- Based on: Tirukkuṛaḷ
- Directed by: Thurai Nagarajan
- Presented by: Vijayan
- Country of origin: India
- Original language: Tamil
- No. of seasons: 1
- No. of episodes: 13

Production
- Production location: Tamil Nadu
- Camera setup: Multi-camera
- Running time: approx. 40–45 minutes per episode

Original release
- Network: Vendhar TV
- Release: 5 November 2017 – 28 January 2018

Thirukkural Payanam is a 2017-2018 Tamil language Quiz reality TV show, that airs on Vendhar TV from 5 November 2017 to 28 January 2018 on every Sunday at 7:00PM (IST) for 13 Episodes. The show about Tirukkuṛaḷ for school and college students in 10 zones: Puducherry, Nellai, Madurai, Chennai, Thiruvarur, Salem, Trichy, Kovai, Vellore and Erode witnessing participation of 1524 students in all.

== Synopsis ==
The show has 4 levels, level 1: Juniors (Classes: 6–8), level 2: Seniors (Classes: 9 & 10), level 3: Super Seniors (Classes: 11 & 12) and level 4: College levels across Tamil Nadu and Puducherry. The contest saw 40 emerging as finalists.

== Winners ==
- 1st: Sobika
- 2nd: Selvaraj
- 3rd: K. Karthik
