= Poovathani =

- Village
- Location in Kerala, India Poovathani (India)
- Coordinates: 10.946291°N 76.321071°E

Poovathan is a village in the Indian state of Kerala. It borders Malappuram and Palakkad Districts and has three Grama Panchayaths (village councils): Thachanattukara, Aliparamba, and Thazhekode.

== Etymology ==
The name is derived from the Poovathani family that used to own the land. It is derived from the two Malayalam words "poovam" (local name of a tree) and "athani" (meaning shelter).

== Economy ==
=== Markets ===
A market runs every week from Sunday through Tuesday. Farmers sell fresh produce, and fishers sell the only non-vegetarian item most of the buyers can afford; fish. Village children eagerly await the chance to receive coins from visiting traders and the local upper class.

Poovathani's market closed when bus service became available. Village traders now take the bus each Monday to more central areas such as Alipparamba, Kampurum and Chethalloor. Residents of these areas had to depend on Poovathani for household items and other essential goods from an array of small and medium shops located on the main road at Poovathani.

The property where the market once existed was sold for partition among its heirs and concrete houses were built in its place.

== Transport ==
Karinkallathani came into prominence as its transport facility improved, while Poovathani was reduced to a place of unimportance.

== Places of worship ==
Poovathani Juma Masjid is a place of worship for Muslims. A nearby ancient temple is known as Panamkurussi Bagavathi Temple. In the annual week-long festival of this temple, popularly known as "Panamkurussi Kavu Pooram," people from all religious sects participate. Ancient Hindu art forms like Cherumakkali, Thullal, Chakyar, Koothu, etc., were played at the Poorapparambu. The Pooram festival is the only festival that gives exposure to such art forms and to the members of other communities in the region.

== Education ==
Poovathani played a pivotal role in the socio-educational development of the region with the presence of a well-educated community. An Upper Primary School is named A.M.U.P. School, established in 1938. This school is one of the biggest schools in the Perintalmanna Educational Sub District. Three religious schools (madrasas) provide religious education, as well as a Balavadi. Apart from the schools and the Balavadi, no major government or government-aided establishments are in Poovathani.
