= Odanthurai, Tamil Nadu =

Odanthurai is a village located in Tamil Nadu

Coordinates: 11.314°N 76.926°E

Odanthurai is a village located in Mettupalayam taluk, India in the Coimbatore district of the state Tamil Nadu. It is governed by the Panchayat system, and is a part of the Karamadai block along with 20 other villages. Odanthurai is notable for its implementation of the Green House Project Scheme through which the village produces electricity for its own use, as well as for the Tamil Nadu Electricity Board (TNEB).

== Demographics ==
The total area of the village is 1,200 hectares. The total population of the village as per the census 2011 is 5,399 with number of households 1,529. The location code of Odanthurai is 644347.

== Industries ==
The village of Odanthurai is famous for its jams & leather polishing powder. Main agricultural crops include bananas, coconut, and mustard seeds.

== In News ==
The village received international attention for its energy self-sufficiency initiative.

== Population ==
There are total 1,529 families residing in Odanthurai. The population consists of 2,686 males and 2,713 females. As of 2011 the literacy rate was 71.3%.
