= Mettupalayam, Coimbatore =

Mettupalayam
- Town
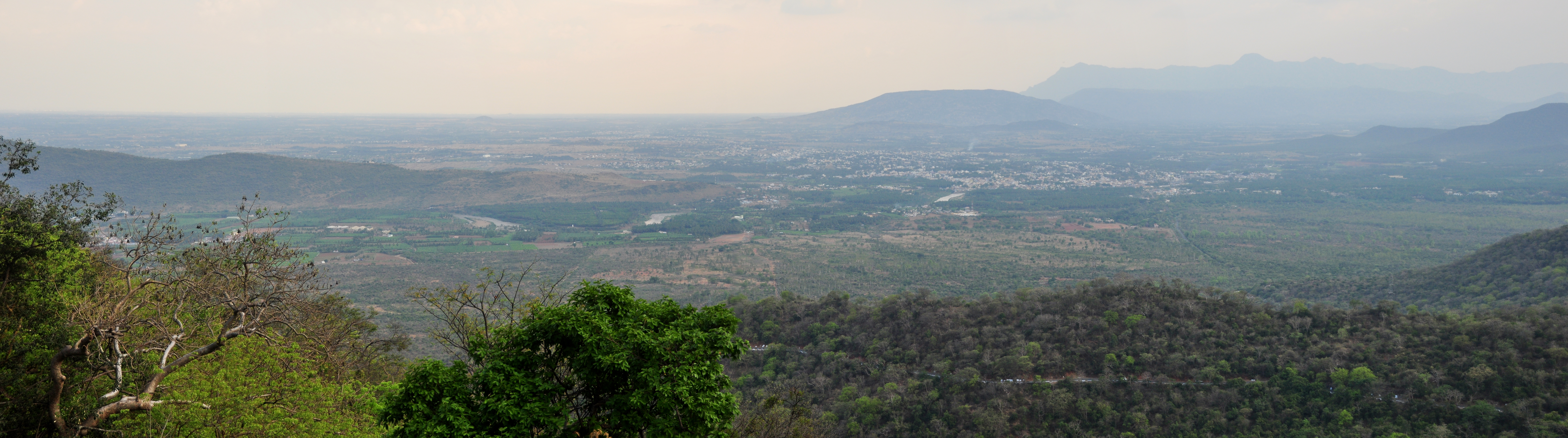
- Mettupalayam Town seen from Ooty hills

- Location in Tamil Nadu, India
- Coordinates: 11°18′20″N 76°56′06″E
- Country: India
- State: Tamil Nadu
- Region: Mettupalayam
- City: Coimbatore
- Elevation: 325 m (1,066 ft)

Population (2011)
  - Total: 66,595

Languages
  - Official: Tamil
- Time zone: UTC+5:30 (IST)
- PIN: 641301
- Telephone code: 91-4254
- Vehicle registration: TN-40

Mettupalayam is a town in the Coimbatore District of the Indian state of Tamil Nadu. It is the second largest town in the Coimbatore district after Pollachi. It is located to the north of Coimbatore city on the way to Ooty, in the foothills of Nilgiri hills. As of 2011, the town had a population of 69,213. Mettupalayam railway station is the starting point of Nilgiri Mountain Railway and it operates the only rack railway in India connecting Ooty and Mettupalayam. It is a suburban area of Coimbatore City.

== Geography ==
Mettupalayam is located at 11.3056°N 76.9350°E. It has an average elevation of 314 m (1,030 ft). Mettupalayam is situated on the bank of Bhavani River at the foot of the Nilgiri mountains.

== Demographics ==
Religious census
Religion	Percent(%)
Hindu	69.24%
Muslim	25.65%
Christian	4.84%
Other	0.26%

According to 2011 census, Mettupalayam had a population of 69,213 with a sex-ratio of 1,022 females for every 1,000 males, much above the national average of 929. A total of 6,808 were under the age of six, constituting 3,543 males and 3,265 females. Scheduled Castes and Scheduled Tribes accounted for 14.76% and 0.08% of the population respectively. The average literacy of the town was 77.11%, compared to the national average of 72.99%. The town had a total of 18,423 households. There were a total of 26,595 workers, comprising 147 cultivators, 437 main agricultural labourers, 704 in house hold industries, 23,870 other workers, 1,437 marginal workers, 8 marginal cultivators, 60 marginal agricultural labourers, 92 marginal workers in household industries and 1,277 other marginal workers.

As per the religious census of 2011, Mettupalayam had 69.24% Hindus, 25.65% Muslims, 4.84% Christians, 0.02% Sikhs, 0.15% Jains, 0.04% following other religions and 0.05% following no religion or did not indicate any religious preference.

== Politics ==
Mettupalayam (State Assembly Constituency) is part of Nilgiris.

== Transport ==
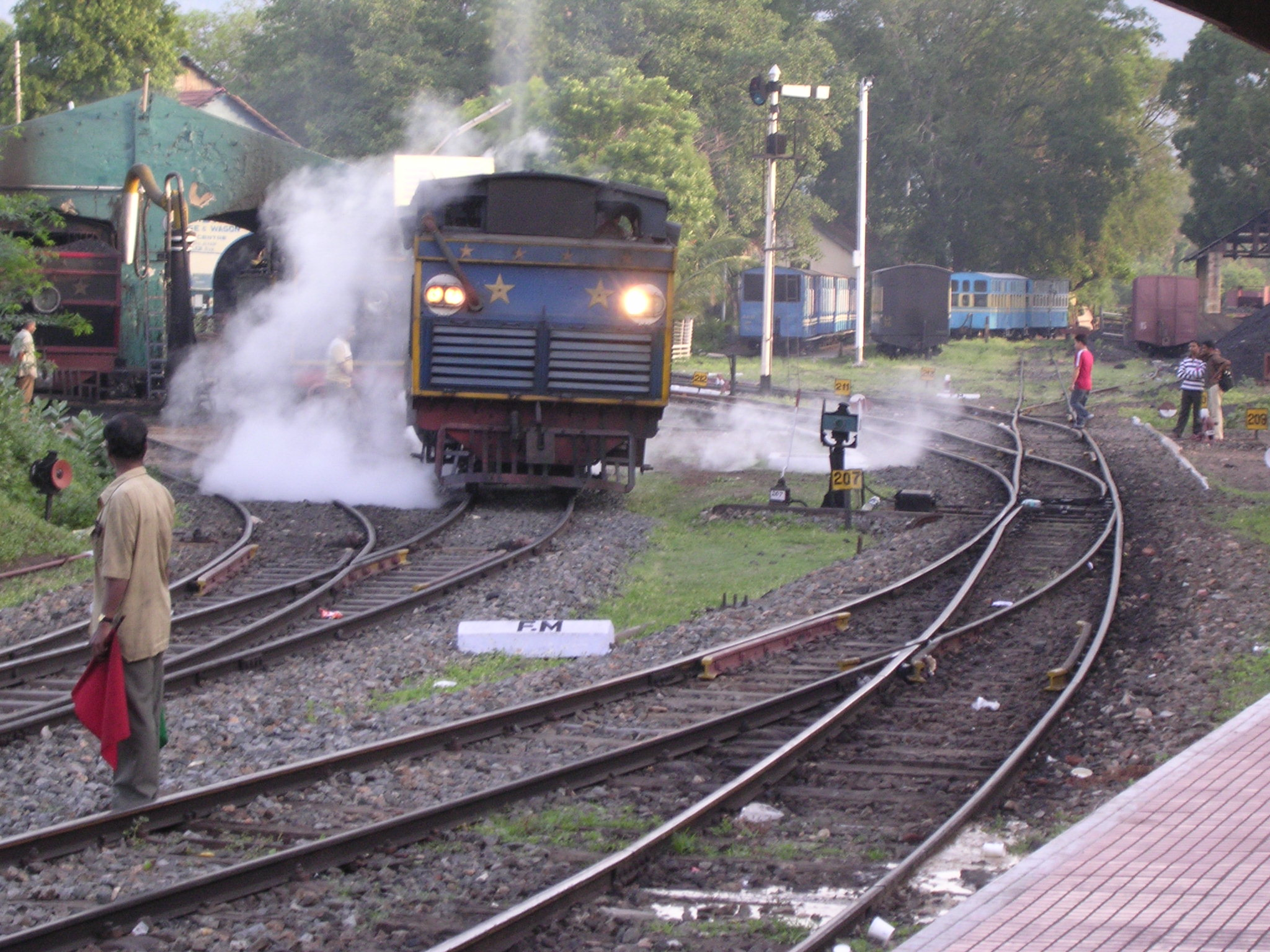
Nilgiri Mountain Railway

The Nilgiri Mountain Railway, which connects Mettupalayam railway station with Udagamandalam (Ooty), is a UNESCO World Heritage Site. Nilgiri Express connects Mettupalayam to the State capital, Chennai, via Coimbatore. Mettupalayam is situated at the base of Nilgiri Hills and hence is the starting point for the Ghat Roads. MEMU express special trains are operated between Coimbatore Junction and Mettupalayam daily. Coimbatore is 35 km by road from Mettupalayam, and the nearest airport is Coimbatore International Airport. There is a proposal for a bypass road from Sulur (Kangayampalayam) via Neelambur for Mettupalayam via Odanthurai to Ooty.

National Highway 181 (India) connecting Gundlupet in Karnataka state to Nagapattinam passes through Mettupalyam. State highway SH15 from Erode to Ooty passes through Chithode, Gobichettipalayam, Sathyamangalam, Sirumugai, Mettupalayam and Kotagiri. State highway SH80 connects Mettupalayam to Avinashi via Annur.

== Places of interest ==
- Black Thunder Water Theme Park
- Shree Sadhguru Sai Baba Temple, Kuttaiyur
- Karamadai Ranganadar Temple
- Forest College and Research Institute, Kotagiri Road
- Idugampalayam Aanjaneyar Temple
- Kallaar Park at Ooty Road
- Kumaran Kundru Murugan Temple
- Kurunthamalai Murugan Temple
- Thekkampatti Elephant Camp
- Then Tirupathi Temple
- Vana Bathrakali Amman temple
- Mettupalayam View Point
- Sennamalai Murugan Temple
- Madeshwarar Temple, Kuttaiyur
- Sri Srinivasa perumal temple, Agraharam

== Entertainment ==
- Movie Theaters: Sri Sakthi, Sivam, and Abhirami.
- Shopping: Explore local shops and markets for a diverse retail experience.

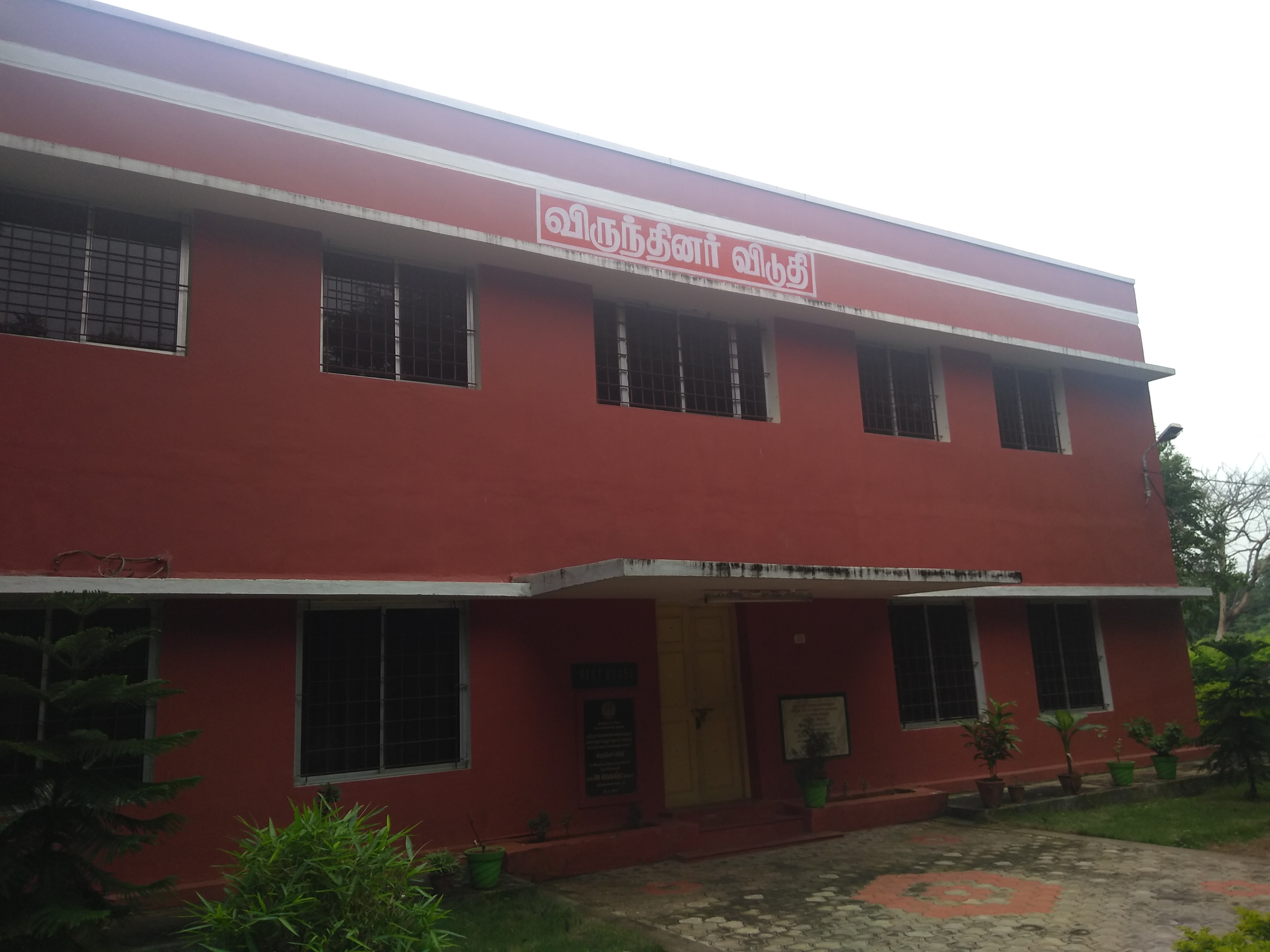
Forestry College and Research Institute, Guest House

== Nearby villages ==
- Marudur
- Kurumbanur
- Athimathaiyanur
- Dhayanur
- Dimmampalayam
- Jadayampalayam
- Lingapuram
- Nellithurai
- Moolathurai
- Odanthurai
- Paapanur
- Palapatti
- Thekkampatti
- Tholampalayam
- Velliangadu
- Kemmarampalayam

== See also ==
- Mountain Train in Ooty
