= B. Arunkumar =

Indian politician

Member of the Tamil Nadu Legislative Assembly
- In office 1996–2001
- Preceded by: L. Sulochana
- Succeeded by: A. K. Selvaraj
- Constituency: Mettupalayam

Personal details
- Party: Dravida Munnetra Kazhagam

B. Arunkumar was elected to the Tamil Nadu Legislative Assembly from the Mettupalayam constituency in the 1996 elections. He was a candidate of the Dravida Munnetra Kazhagam (DMK) party.

== Electoral career ==
=== Tamil Nadu Legislative Assembly Elections Contested ===
Election	Constituency	Party	Result	Vote %	Opposition Candidate	Opposition Party	Opposition vote %
1991	Mettupalayam	DMK	Lost	60.82	L. Sulochana	AIADMK	26.01
1996	Mettupalayam	DMK	Won	55.60	K. Doraiswamy	AIADMK	31.84
2001	Mettupalayam	DMK	Lost	31.21	A. K. Selvaraj	AIADMK	60.02
2006	Mettupalayam	DMK	Lost	44.41	O. K. Chinnaraj	AIADMK	44.50
2011	Mettupalayam	DMK	Lost	39.53	O. K. Chinnaraj	AIADMK	54.53
