= Chikkarampalayam =

Neighbourhood in Coimbatore district, Tamil Nadu, India

- Village
- Chikkarampalayam, Coimbatore district, Tamil Nadu
- Coordinates: 11.2415°N 76.9857°E
- Country: India
- State: Tamil Nadu
- District: Coimbatore
- Tehsil: Mettupalayam taluk
- Elevation: 378.17 m (1,240.7 ft)

Population (2011)
  - Total: 10,242
- Time zone: UTC+5:30 (IST)

Chikkarampalayam is a village in Mettupalayam taluk, Coimbatore district, Tamil Nadu, India. As of the 2011 Census of India, it had a population of 10,242 across 2,957 households. There were 5,059 males and 5,183 females.
