= Noolpuzha =

- village
- Location in Kerala, India Noolpuzha (India)
- Coordinates: 11°40′0″N 76°18′50″E
- Country: India
- State: Kerala
- District: Wayanad

Population (2011)
  - Total: 14,133

Languages
  - Official: Malayalam, English
- Time zone: UTC+5:30 (IST)
- PIN: 6XXXXX
- ISO 3166 code: IN-KL
- Vehicle registration: KL-73

Noolpuzha is a village near Sulthan bathery in Wayanad district in the state of Kerala, India.

== Demographics ==
As of 2011 India census, Noolpuzha had a population of 14,133, with 6,965 males and 7,168.
