= Madathiparambu =

- town
- Location in Kerala, India Madathiparambu (India)
- Coordinates: 9.78192°N 76.512°E
- Country: India
- State: Kerala
- District: Kottayam

Languages
  - Official: Malayalam, English
- Time zone: UTC+5:30 (IST)
- Vehicle registration: KL-
- Coastline: 0 kilometres (0 mi)
- Climate: Tropical monsoon (Köppen)
- Avg. summer temperature: 35 °C (95 °F)
- Avg. winter temperature: 20 °C (68 °F)

Madathiparambu is a small town and a part of Neezhoor village in Kottayam district, Kerala.

== Location ==
It is situated approximately 4 kilometres from Kaduthuruthy, in Kottayam-Ilanji Bus route.

== Landmarks ==
Madathipparambu Mahadeva Temple and St. Kuriakose Public School are located in Madathipparambu.
