= A. K. Selvaraj =

Indian politician

Member of Parliament, Rajya Sabha
- In office 3 April 2014 – 2 April 2020
- Chief Minister: J. Jayalalithaa
- Constituency: Tamil Nadu

Member of the Tamil Nadu Legislative Assembly
- In office 12 May 2021 – 2026
- Preceded by: O. K. Chinnaraj
- Succeeded by: Sunilanand
- Constituency: Mettupalayam
- In office 13 May 2001 – 11 May 2006
- Preceded by: B. Arunkumar
- Succeeded by: R. V. Ramanathan

Minister for Housing & Urban Development
- In office 14 May 2001 – 21 September 2001
- Preceded by: K. Pitchandi
- Succeeded by: S. M. Velusamy

Personal details
- Born: 4 July 1958 (age 68) Coimbatore District, Madras State (now Tamil Nadu, India)
- Party: All India Anna Dravida Munnetra Kazhagam
- Occupation: Politician

A.K. Selvaraj (born 4 July 1958) is an Indian politician. He served as a Member of Parliament, represented from Tamil Nadu state in the Rajya Sabha (the upper house of Indian Parliament).

He was the Minister for Housing & Urban Development.

== Electoral Career ==
=== Tamil Nadu Legislative Assembly Elections Contested ===
Election	Constituency	Party	Result	Vote %	Opposition Candidate	Opposition Party	Opposition vote %
2001	Mettupalayam	AIADMK	Won	60.02	B. Arunkumar	DMK	31.21
2021	Mettupalayam	AIADMK	Won	46.75	T. R. Shanmugasundaram	DMK	45.66

=== Rajya Sabha Elections Contested ===
Year	Election	Party	PC Name	Result
2014	Rajya Sabha	All India Anna Dravida Munnetra Kazhagam	Tamil Nadu	Won

== See also ==
- Rajya Sabha members from Tamil Nadu
