= Edamulackal =

Village near Anchal, Kerala

- village
- Location in Kerala, India Edamulackal (India)
- Coordinates: 8°54′0″N 76°53′0″E
- Country: India
- State: Kerala
- District: Kollam

Government
  - Body: Gram panchayat

Population (2011)
  - Total: 39,244
  - Density: 38.73/km^{2} (100.3/sq mi)

Languages
  - Official: Malayalam, English
- Time zone: UTC+5:30 (IST)
- Postal code: 691306
- Vehicle registration: KL-25

Edamulackal is a village and gram panchayat in Kollam district in the state of Kerala, India. Situated near the second fastest growing town of Kerala, Anchal. Ayoor is the main town thats located on the M C Road or state highway One, within the area limits of Edamulackal gram panchayat.

Edamulackal village area, still retaining the form of a typical Kerala village, is developing fast in education and service sectors too. The greeny slightly uneven terrain supports a range of agricultural activities, supported by the waters of Ithikkara river.

As of 2011 India census, Edamulackal had a population of 39244 with 18297 males and 20947 females.
