= Karamadai =

- Municipality
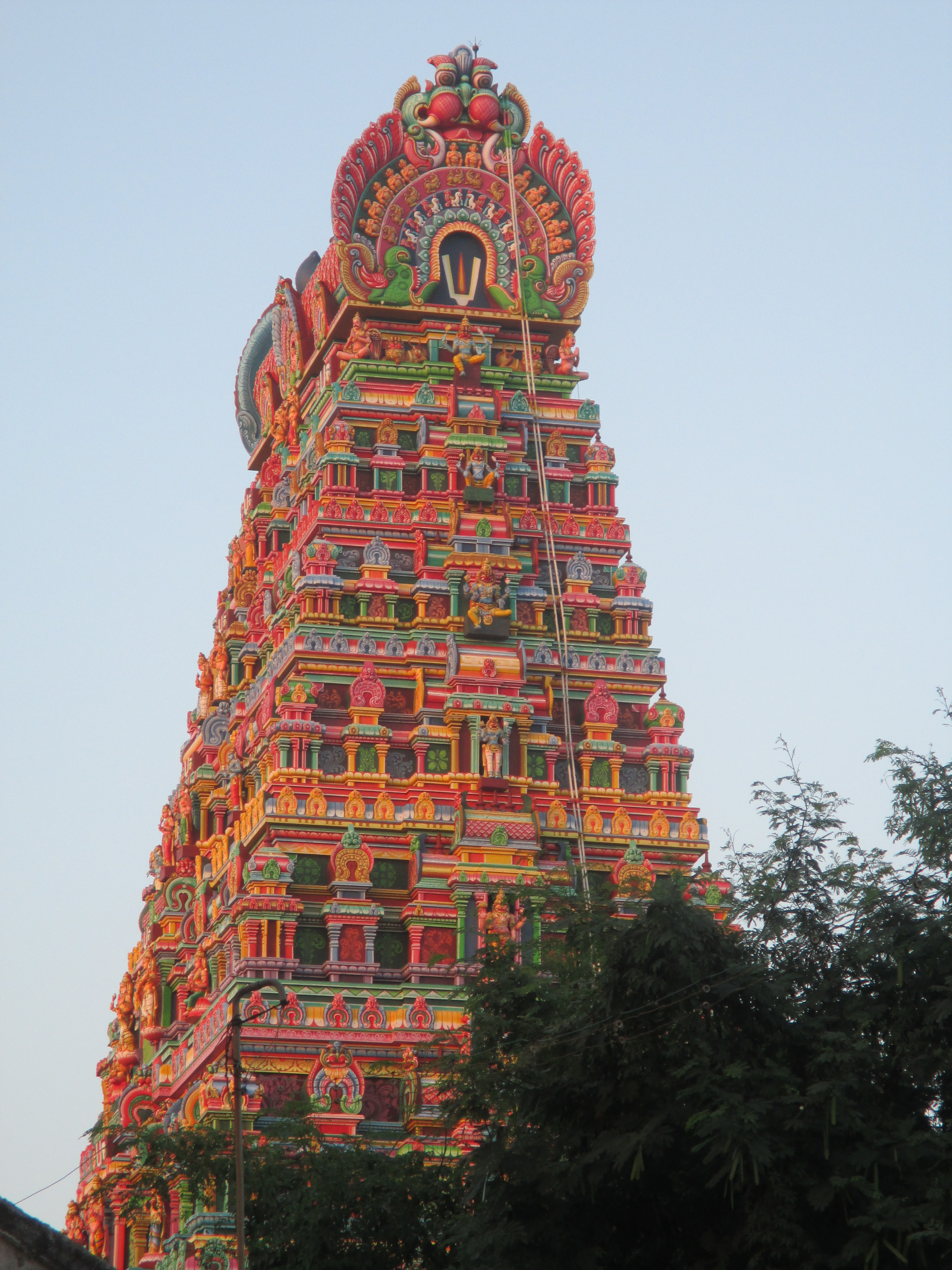
- Ranganathaswamy temple

- Location in Tamil Nadu, India
- Coordinates: 11.242800°N 76.958700°E
- Country: India
- State: Tamil Nadu
- District: Coimbatore

Area
  - Total: 10 km^{2} (3.9 sq mi)
- Elevation: 391 m (1,283 ft)

Population (2011)
  - Total: 35,166
  - Density: 3,500/km^{2} (9,100/sq mi)

Languages
  - Official: Tamil
- Time zone: UTC+05:30 (IST)
- Postal Code: 641104
- Telephone Code: +91-4254
- Vehicle registration: TN-40

Karamadai is a municipality in Mettupalayam taluk of Coimbatore district in the Indian state of Tamil Nadu. Spread across an area of 10 km^{2} (3.9 sq mi), it had a population of 35,166 individuals as per the 2011 census. The Ranganathaswamy temple and Nanjundeswarar temple are prominent landmarks in the town.

== Geography and administration ==
Karamadai is a municipality located in Mettupalayam taluk of Coimbatore district in the Indian state of Tamil Nadu. Spread across an area of 10 km^{2} (3.9 sq mi), it was a panchayat town till 2021, when it was upgraded to a municipality. It is located in the western part of the state. The region has a tropical climate with hot summers and mild winters. The highest temperatures are recorded in April and May, with lowest recordings in December–January.

The municipality is headed by a chairperson, who is elected by the members, who are chosen through direct elections. The town forms part of the Mettupalayam Assembly constituency that elects its member to the Tamil Nadu legislative assembly and the Nilgiris Lok Sabha constituency that elects its member to the Parliament of India.

== Demographics ==
As per the 2011 census, Karamadai had a population of 35,166 individuals across 9,792 households. The population saw a marginal increase compared to the previous census in 2001 when 27,817 inhabitants were registered. The population consisted of 17,557 males and 17,609 females. About 3,056 individuals were below the age of six years. The entire population is classified as urban. The town has an average literacy rate of 84.6%. About 14% of the population belonged to scheduled castes. About 42.6% of the eligible population were employed full-time.

Hinduism was the majority religion which was followed by 87.6% of the population, with Christianity (7.4%) and Islam (4.9%) being minor religions. The Ranganathaswamy temple and Nanjundeswarar temple are prominent pilgrimage sites and landmarks in the town. The Ranganathaswamy temple is dedicated to Vishnu, and was built by the Cholas. The Nanjundeswarar temple is dedicated to Shiva and his consort Parvati.
