= Sirumugai =

- Panchayat town
- Location in Tamil Nadu, India
- Coordinates: 11°19′20.1″N 77°00′31.9″E
- Country: India
- State: Tamil Nadu
- District: Coimbatore

Area
  - Total: 6.28 km^{2} (2.42 sq mi)

Population (2011)
  - Total: 18,223
  - Density: 2,900/km^{2} (7,520/sq mi)

Languages
  - Official: Tamil
- Time zone: UTC+5:30 (IST)

Sirumugai is a panchayat town in Mettupalayam taluk of Coimbatore district in the Indian state of Tamil Nadu. Located in the western part of the state on the banks of the Bhavani River, it is one of the 33 panchayat towns in the district. Spread across an area of 6.28 km^{2} (2.42 sq mi), it had a population of 18,223 individuals as per the 2011 census.

== Geography and administration ==
Sirumugai is located in Mettupalayam taluk of Coimbatore district in the Indian state of Tamil Nadu. It is one of the 33 panchayat towns in the district. Spread across an area of 6.28 km^{2} (2.42 sq mi), it is located on the banks of Bhavani River in the western part of the state. Pollution of the Bhavani river is a major ecological and environmental concern in the town. The region has a tropical climate with hot summers and mild winters. The highest temperatures are recorded in April and May, with lowest recordings in December-January.

The town panchayat is headed by a chairperson, who is elected by the members, who are chosen through direct elections. The town forms part of the Mettupalayam Assembly constituency that elects its member to the Tamil Nadu legislative assembly and the Nilgiris Lok Sabha constituency that elects its member to the Parliament of India.

== Demographics ==
As per the 2011 census, Sirumugai had a population of 18,223 individuals across 5,294 households. The population saw a marginal increase compared to the previous census in 2001 when 19,383 inhabitants were registered. The population consisted of 9,015 males and 9,208 females. About 1,471 individuals were below the age of six years. The entire population is classified as urban. The town has an average literacy rate of 79.3%. About 14.6% of the population belonged to scheduled castes and 4.1% belonged to scheduled tribes.

About 49.9% of the eligible population were employed, of which majority were involved in agriculture and allied activities. Hinduism was the majority religion which was followed by 93% of the population, with Christianity (3.2%) and Islam (3.5%) being minor religions.

One of the famous astrologer, Music teacher, Judge, Jury, High priest and TV personality Sirumugai K.J Sreepathi hails from here. He is known for is accurate astrological predictions and birthstone or zodiac stone selections. He was one of the jury in the music reality show Saregamapa on Zee Tamil. He is one of the most sought after judge for music competitions around the Kongu region.
