= Ranganathaswamy temple, Karamadai =

Hindu temple in Coimbatore

Ranganathaswamy Temple
- Karamadai temple
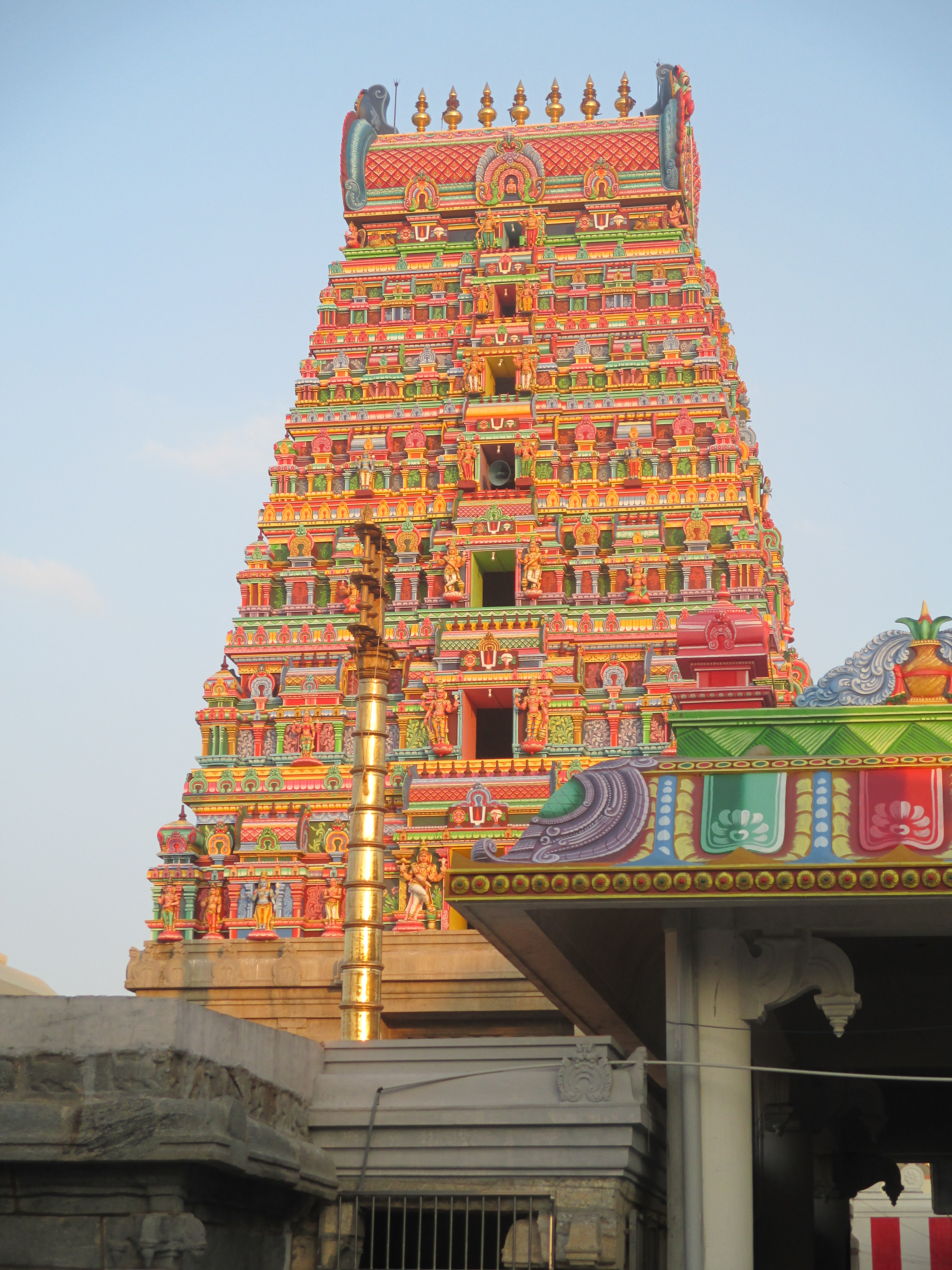

- Location in Tamil Nadu

Religion
- Affiliation: Hinduism
- District: Coimbatore
- Deity: Ranganathaswamy (Vishnu), Ranganayaki Thayar (Lakshmi), Bettadamman (Bhudevi)

Location
- Location: Karamadai
- State: Tamil Nadu
- Country: India
- Coordinates: 11°14′32″N 76°57′37″E

Architecture
- Type: Architecture of Tamil Nadu

Ranganathaswamy temple (also called Karamadai Temple) in Karamadai, a town panchayat in Coimbatore district in the South Indian state of Tamil Nadu, is dedicated to the Hindu god Vishnu. It is located 23 km from Coimbatore in the Coimbatore–Mettuplayam highway. Constructed in the Dravidian style of architecture, the temple is dedicated to Vishnu, who is worshipped as Ranganathaswamy and his consort Lakshmi as Ranganayaki in this temple. It is considered one among the 108 Abhimana Kshethram of Vaishnavate tradition and also one among the Pancharanga Kshetrams in Coimbatore, other four are (1) Melmudi Ranganathar near Thadagam, (2) Palamalai Ranganathar near Kovanur, (3) Thandigai Ranganathar on Kataanji hills near Selvapuram and (4) Thogaimalai Ranganathar near Dhayanur.

As per Hindu legend, the face of Ranganatha was found under an anthill in the place where the Kattariyar tribe was residing. A granite wall surrounds the temple, enclosing all its shrines. The temple has a seven-tiered rajagopuram, the temple's gateway tower.

The temple follows the Tenkalai tradition of worship. Four daily rituals and many yearly festivals are held at the temple, of which the fifteen-day annual Brahmotsavam during the Tamil month of Maasi (February–March), Vaikunta Ekadasi and Ramanuja Jayanti being the most prominent. The temple is maintained and administered by the Hindu Religious and Charitable Endowments Department of the Government of Tamil Nadu.

== Legend ==
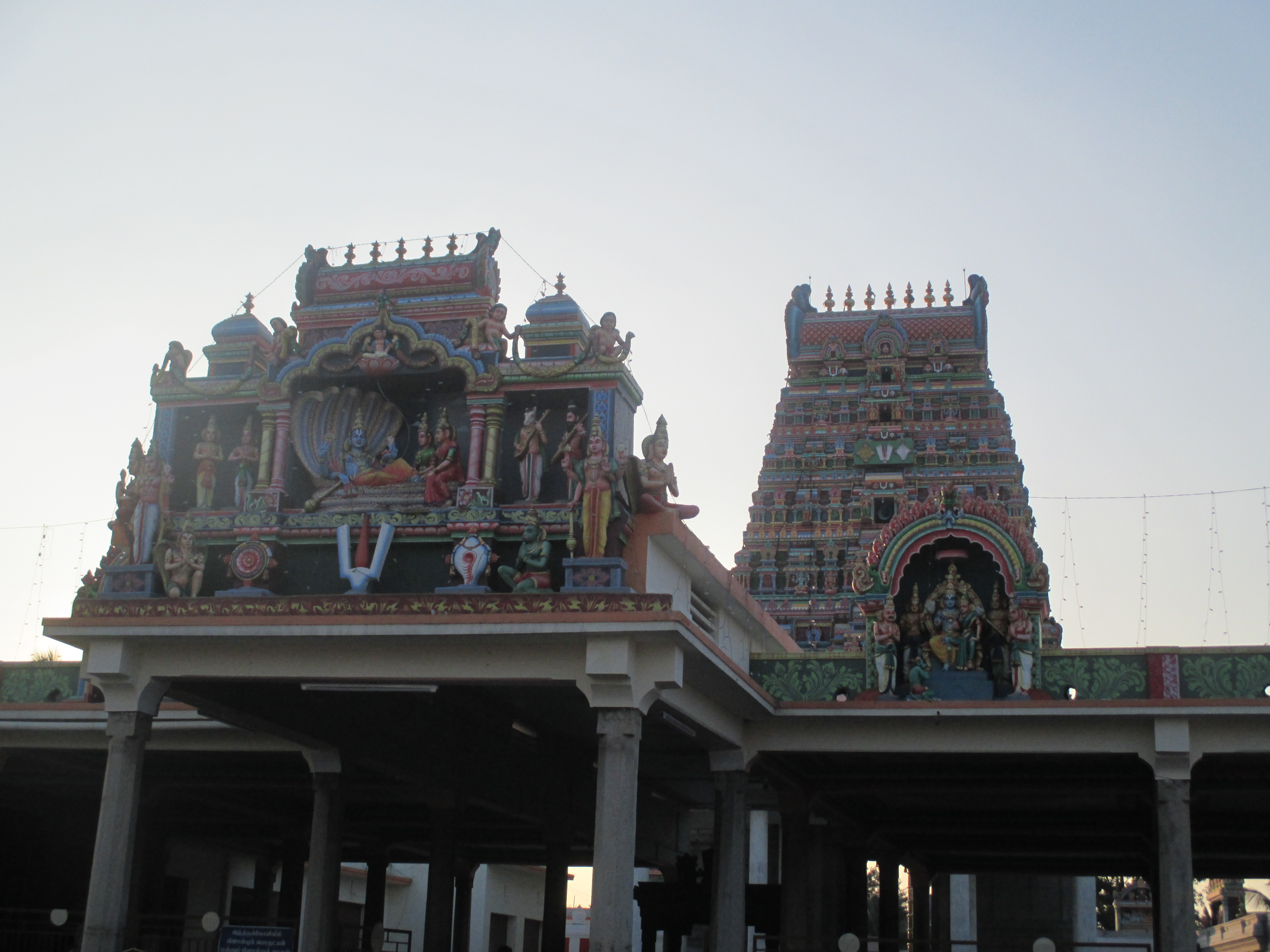
Image of the entrance

As per Hindu legend, the place was once a forest with Karai trees. A tribe named Kottariyar inhabited the region, whose main profession was herding cattle. One day a herdsman found that his cow was not giving him any milk and emptied all its milk in an anthill. He dug up the anthill, but was astonished to see blood coming out of it. After spiritual advice of a priest named Vedavyasabhattar, a temple was erected around the anthill. Vishnu is said to have appeared in the dreams of Pitchu Mandarayar, one of the inhabitants.

As per a modern legend, a British general was trying to build a railway line bisecting the temple. The people of the village prayed for divine intervention. It is believed that Vishnu appeared in the dream of the General, who later withdrew his plans to demolish the temple. He also gifted a festive image of a horse to be used during divine procession.

== History ==
The temple is originally believed to have been built during the Chola Empire during the 10–11th centuries. Tirumalai Nayakar (1623–59 CE) expanded the temple during his regime and built the walls and halls in the temple. Jayachamarajendra Wadiyar (1940–1950) built a set of other halls in the temple. Ramanuja (1017–1137 CE), the expounder of Vaishnadvaita philosophy is believed to have visited the temple on his way to Melkote from Srirangam Ranganathaswamy temple. The northern temple tower was built during 1944, while the seven-tiered 80 ft (24 m) Eastern tower was built during 2013. Some of the old halls were also renovated during 2013.

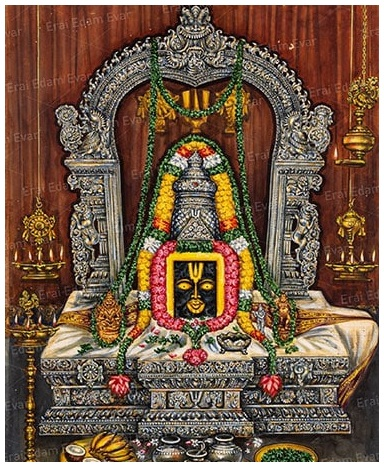
Karamadai Ranganathaswamy

== Administration ==
The temple is maintained and administered by the Hindu Religious and Charitable Endowments Department of the Government of Tamil Nadu.

== Architecture ==
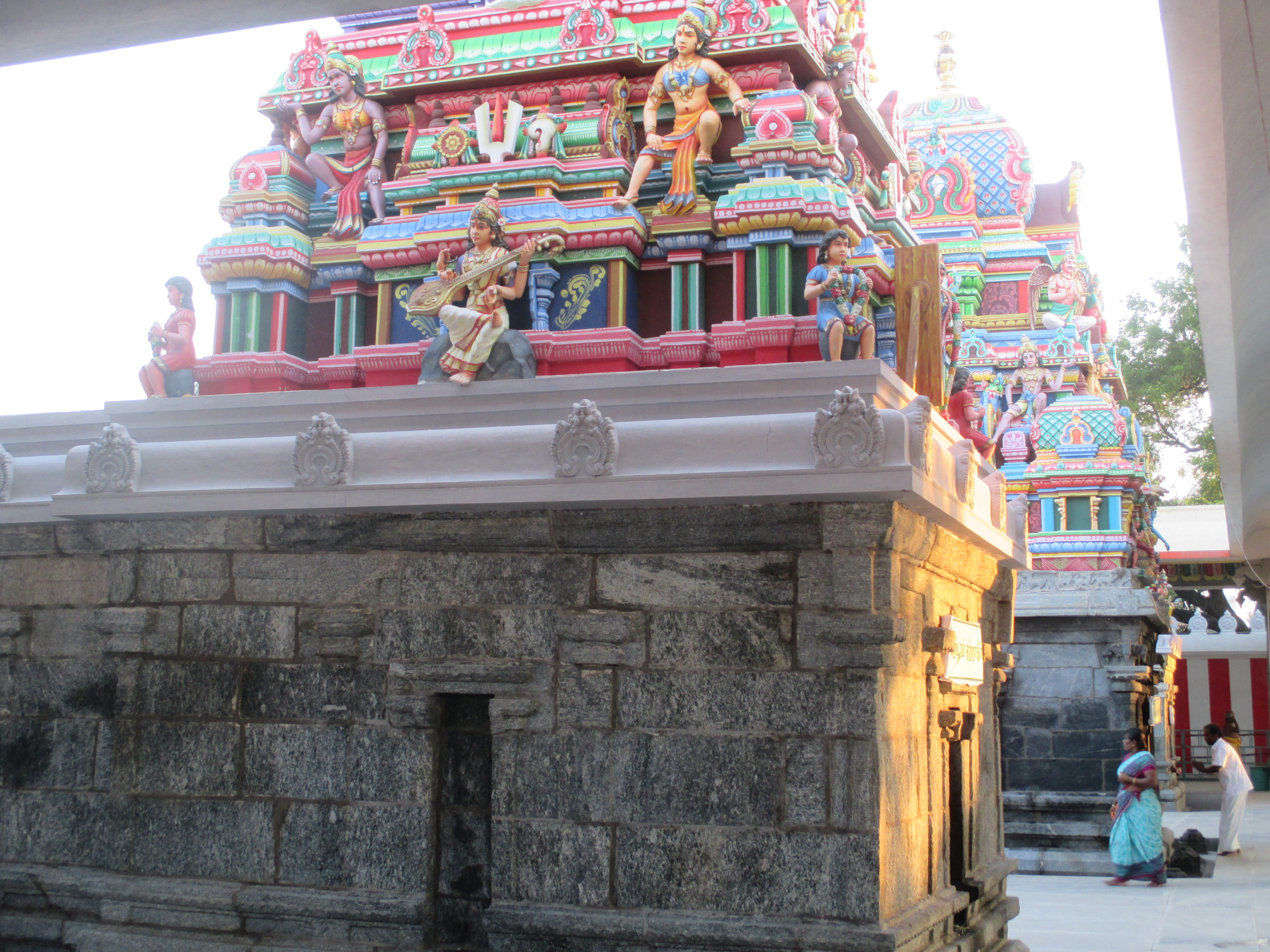
Image of shrines in the temple

Ranganathaswamy temple is constructed in the Tamil architecture. The temple occupies an area of 1 acre (0.40 ha) and is surrounded by granite walls. The seven tiered rajagopuram, the temple's gateway tower, has seven kalasam at the top. Unlike the sanctum houses the image of Ranganathaswamy, where the image is sported in standing, sitting and reclining posture, only the face of Ranganathar is seen in the temple. The Ardha mandapa is guarded by two Dvarapalas on either sides. The shrine of Soundaravalli is located closed to the eastern gateway. There Mahamandapa houses the images of Vedanta Desikar, Manavala Mamunigal, Alvars, and Ramanuja. There are separate shrines for Rama housing Sita, Lakshmana and Hanuman. There are a number of smaller shrines and halls in the precincts of the temple. The temple is maintained and administered by the Hindu Religious and Endowment Board of the Government of Tamil Nadu.

== Festival ==
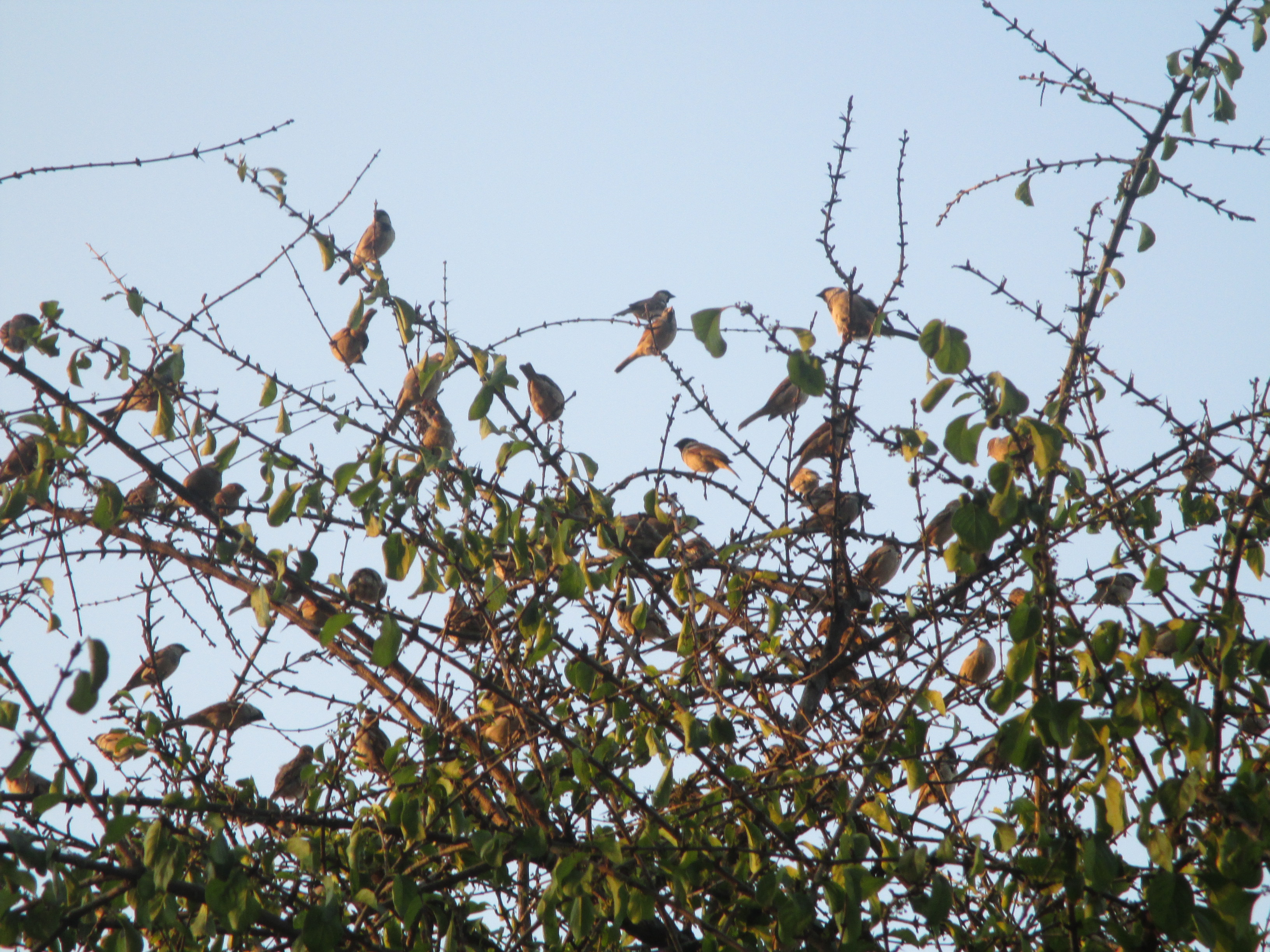
The temple tree

The temple is one of the prominent landmarks of Karamadai and one of the most visited tourist destinations in the region. The temple follows the traditions of the Thenkalai sect of Vaishnavite tradition and follows Pancharathra aagama. The temple rituals are performed four times a day: Kalasanthi at 8:00 a.m., Uchikalam at 12:00 p.m., Sayarakshai at 5:00 p.m. and Aravanai Pooja at 8:00 p.m. Each ritual has three steps: alangaram (decoration), neivethanam (food offering) and deepa aradanai (waving of lamps) for both Ranganathaswamy and Ranganayagi. There are various daily, weekly, monthly and fortnightly rituals performed in the temple. Various festivals are celebrated in the temple, of which fifteen-day annual Brahmotsavam during the Tamil month of Maasi (February–March), Vaikuntha Ekadashi and Ramanuja Jayanti being the most prominent. During the Brahmotsavam, the temple car is drawn around the streets of temple with the festival images housed in it. Southern railways used to operate free services from Coimbatore to Mettupalayam till 1983 during the annual chariot festival.
