= Ghulewadi =

- sangamner
- sangamner, Maharashtra, India
- Coordinates: 19.6143°N 74.1877°E
- Country: India
- State: Maharashtra
- District: Ahmednagar

Population (2001)
  - Total: 19,371

Languages
  - Official: Marathi
- Time zone: UTC+5:30 (IST)

Ghulewadi is a census town in Ahmednagar district in the Indian state of Maharashtra.

== Demographics ==
As of 2001 India census, Ghulewadi had a population of 19,371. Males constitute 55% of the population and females 45%. Ghulewadi has an average literacy rate of 72%, higher than the national average of 59.5%: male literacy is 76%, and female literacy is 66%. In Ghulewadi, 13% of the population is under 6 years of age.
