= Nausena Baugh =

Nausena Baugh (Hindi: नौसेना बाग़) is a Naval Base located near the Anushakti Nagar in Mumbai, Maharashtra, India.

== See also ==
- Indian Navy
- Government of India
- Centre for Airborne Systems
