= Mettupalayam =

Mettupalayam may refer to:

- Mettupalayam, Coimbatore, Tamil Nadu, India
  - Mettupalayam railway station
- Mettupalayam, Tiruchirappalli district, Tamil Nadu, India.
