= Velliangadu =

Village in Coimbatore, Tamil Nadu, India

- village
- Location in Tamil Nadu, India Velliangadu (India)
- Coordinates: 11.2133°N 76.825°E
- Country: India
- State: Tamil Nadu
- District: Coimbatore

Languages
  - Official: Tamil
- Time zone: UTC+5:30 (IST)

Velliangadu is the largest and capital village of Velliangadu panchayat union in the district of Coimbatore, also known as Kovai in the state of Tamil Nadu, India.
