= Kovai =

Kovai may refer to:

- Kovai Senthil Tamil film character artist
- Kovai Brothers 2006 Tamil-language comedy spoof film

== See also ==
- Coimbatore
