= Black Thunder (theme park) =

Amusement park in Tamil Nadu, India

Coordinates: 11°19′41″N 76°54′42″E

- Slogan: India's Largest Water Park
- Location: Coimbatore, Tamil Nadu, India
- Owner: Louis Adaikalaraj Francis Adaikalaraj Vincent Adaikalraj
- Opened: 1997
- Operating season: Open all year
- Website: www.blackthunder.in

Black Thunder Theme Park (P) Ltd is a theme park in Tamil Nadu, India. It is located on the National Highway (Mettupalayam-Ooty) on the foothills of Nilgiris. It is situated in Coimbatore city, 40 km north of the city and occupies an area of about 60 acres (24 ha). The nearest airport is in Coimbatore and the nearest railway station is at Mettupalayam.

Prior to the COVID-19 pandemic in Tamil Nadu, the park relied on a lot of visitors from educational institutions. The closures of such institutions during the pandemic prompted the park to get assistance from a governmental body.

Black Thunder theme park is the Largest Water Park in India that offers more than 70 rides & attractions out of which 35 numbers are water rides. Black Thunder theme park is the only park in India with maximum safety for water slides as they are installed with 'Foam Paddings' on its sliding surface.

Few of the most popular rides/ attractions include: Lucky Falls, Wave pool, Family Pool, Ladies & Kids Pool, Surf Hill, Rapid Side, Speed Slide, Thunder Rain, Lazy River, Slam Bob, Family Coaster, Thunder Spin, Rain Forest etc.

The park also has a Luxury Hotel on its premises that offers a great view of the surrounding mountains with well-appointed rooms, plush greenery in the surroundings, lot of games & activities for children, adventure games etc.
