= Marudur, Coimbatore =

Marudur
- village
- Location in Tamil Nadu, India Marudur (India)
- Coordinates: 11.23414°N 76.90667°E
- Country: India
- State: Tamil Nadu
- District: Coimbatore

Languages
  - Official: Tamil
- Time zone: UTC+5:30 (IST)
- PIN: 641104
- Vehicle registration: TN-40

Marudur is a panchayat village located near Karamadai in the Coimbatore District, of Tamil Nadu in India.

== Demographics ==
As of 2011 India census Marudur in Coimbatore District, Tamil Nadu, had a population of 9,491. Average literacy rate of the people in this panchayat is 64.86% which is higher than the national average.
