= Mettupalayam Assembly constituency =

One of the 234 State Legislative Assembly Constituencies in Tamil Nadu, in India

Coordinates: 11.3000°N 76.9500°E

Mettupalayam
- Constituency No. 111 for the Tamil Nadu Legislative Assembly

Constituency details
- Country: India
- Region: South India
- State: Tamil Nadu
- District: Coimbatore
- Lok Sabha constituency: Nilgiris
- Established: 1951
- Total electors: 2,82,235
- Reservation: None

Member of Legislative Assembly
- 17th Tamil Nadu Legislative Assembly
- Incumbent Sunilanand
- Party: TVK
- Elected year: 2026

Mettupalayam is a legislative assembly constituency in Coimbatore district in the Indian state of Tamil Nadu. It comes under Nilgiris Lok Sabha constituency. It is one of the 234 State Legislative Assembly Constituencies in Tamil Nadu, in India.

== Members of Legislative Assembly ==
=== Madras State ===
Year	Winner	Party
1952	Kempi Gowder	Independent
1957	D. Raghubadhi Devi	Indian National Congress
1962	N. Shanmuga Sundaram	Indian National Congress
1967	T. T. S. Thippiah	Indian National Congress

=== Tamil Nadu ===
Year	Winner	Party
1971	M. C. Thooyamani	Dravida Munnetra Kazhagam
1977	S. Palanisamy	All India Anna Dravida Munnetra Kazhagam
1980	S. Palanisamy	All India Anna Dravida Munnetra Kazhagam
1984	M. Chinnaraj	All India Anna Dravida Munnetra Kazhagam
1989	V. Gopalakrishnan	Indian National Congress
1991	L. Sulochana	All India Anna Dravida Munnetra Kazhagam
1996	B. Arunkumar	Dravida Munnetra Kazhagam
2001	A. K. Selvaraj	All India Anna Dravida Munnetra Kazhagam
2006	O. K. Chinnaraj	All India Anna Dravida Munnetra Kazhagam
2011	O. K. Chinnaraj	All India Anna Dravida Munnetra Kazhagam
2016	O. K. Chinnaraj	All India Anna Dravida Munnetra Kazhagam
2021	A. K. Selvaraj	All India Anna Dravida Munnetra Kazhagam
2026	N. Sunil Anand	Tamilaga Vettri Kazhagam

== Election results ==
Vote share of winning candidates
2026	30.97%
2021	46.75%
2016	44.41%
2011	54.53%
2006	44.50%
2001	60.02%
1996	55.60%
1991	60.82%
1989	28.21%
1984	59.60%
1980	58.96%
1977	32.37%
1971	56.08%
1967	45.42%
1962	46.90%
1957	49.37%
1952	19.24%

=== 2026 ===
2026 Tamil Nadu Legislative Assembly election: Mettupalayam
Party	Candidate	Votes	%	±%
TVK	N. Sunil Anand	75,664	30.97	New
DMK	Smt. Kavitha Kalyanasundaram	67,896	27.79	▼17.87
AIADMK	O. K. Chinnaraj	61,736	25.27	▼21.48
Independent	T. R. Shanmugasundaram	26,756	10.95	New
NTK	S. Gopalakrishnan	6,508	2.66	▼2.21
NOTA	NOTA	839	0.34	▼0.87
Margin of victory		7,768	3.18	▲2.09
Turnout		2,44,319	86.57	▲10.75
Registered electors		2,82,235		▼14,635
TVK gain from AIADMK		Swing	▲30.97	

=== 2021 ===
2021 Tamil Nadu Legislative Assembly election: Mettupalayam
Party	Candidate	Votes	%	±%
AIADMK	A. K. Selvaraj	105,231	46.75%	+2.34
DMK	T. R. Shanmugasundaram	102,775	45.66%	+8.9
NTK	K. Yasmin	10,954	4.87%	+4.15
NOTA	NOTA	2,733	1.21%	−0.4
AMMK	P. Saravanan	1,864	0.83%	New
Margin of victory		2,456	1.09%	−6.55%
Turnout		225,083	75.82%	0.31%
Rejected ballots		456	0.20%	
Registered electors		296,870		
AIADMK hold		Swing	2.34%	

=== 2016 ===
2016 Tamil Nadu Legislative Assembly election: Mettupalayam
Party	Candidate	Votes	%	±%
AIADMK	O. K. Chinnaraj	93,595	44.41%	−10.12
DMK	S. Surendran	77,481	36.76%	−2.77
TMC(M)	T. R. Shanmuga Sundaram	13,324	6.32%	New
BJP	P. Jaganathan	11,036	5.24%	+1.95
NOTA	NOTA	3,408	1.62%	New
SDPI	S. Mohammed Rafi	2,209	1.05%	New
PMK	K. Moorthi	1,870	0.89%	New
KMDK	K. Vellingiri	1,604	0.76%	New
NTK	A. Abdul Vahab	1,509	0.72%	New
Independent	K. Venkatesh	1,264	0.60%	New
Independent	M. K. Poongundran	1,145	0.54%	New
Margin of victory		16,114	7.65%	−7.35%
Turnout		210,761	75.51%	−5.62%
Registered electors		279,110		
AIADMK hold		Swing	-10.12%	

=== 2011 ===
2011 Tamil Nadu Legislative Assembly election: Mettupalayam
Party	Candidate	Votes	%	±%
AIADMK	O. K. Chinnaraj	93,700	54.53%	+10.02
DMK	B. Arunkumar	67,925	39.53%	−4.88
BJP	K. R. Nandhakumar	5,647	3.29%	+1.18
CPI(ML)L	R. Janaki Raman	1,433	0.83%	New
Independent	B. Ravichandran	1,382	0.80%	New
Margin of victory		25,775	15.00%	14.91%
Turnout		211,799	81.13%	6.91%
Registered electors		171,836		
AIADMK hold		Swing	10.02%	

=== 2006 ===
2006 Tamil Nadu Legislative Assembly election: Mettupalayam
Party	Candidate	Votes	%	±%
AIADMK	O. K. Chinnaraj	67,445	44.50%	−15.52
DMK	B. Arunkumar	67,303	44.41%	+13.2
DMDK	V. Saraswathi	10,877	7.18%	New
BJP	P. Jeganathan	3,187	2.10%	New
Independent	R. Premnath	1,346	0.89%	New
Margin of victory		142	0.09%	−28.72%
Turnout		151,546	74.23%	9.35%
Registered electors		204,170		
AIADMK hold		Swing	-15.52%	

=== 2001 ===
2001 Tamil Nadu Legislative Assembly election: Mettupalayam
Party	Candidate	Votes	%	±%
AIADMK	A. K. Selvaraj	85,578	60.02%	+28.18
DMK	B. Arunkumar	44,500	31.21%	−24.39
MDMK	B. N. Rajendran	6,755	4.74%	−1.3
NCP	U. N. Murugasan Benjamin	2,339	1.64%	New
Independent	M. Jabbar	1,474	1.03%	New
Margin of victory		41,078	28.81%	5.05%
Turnout		142,577	64.88%	−5.30%
Registered electors		219,782		
AIADMK gain from DMK		Swing	4.42%	

=== 1996 ===
1996 Tamil Nadu Legislative Assembly election: Mettupalayam
Party	Candidate	Votes	%	±%
DMK	B. Arunkumar	71,954	55.60%	+29.6
AIADMK	K. Doraiswamy	41,202	31.84%	−28.98
MDMK	T. T. Arangasamy	7,817	6.04%	New
BJP	Sri. Nandhakumar	4,884	3.77%	−2.08
PMK	A. Thangaraj	1,548	1.20%	New
JP	S. B. Anbuselvan	761	0.59%	New
Margin of victory		30,752	23.76%	−11.06%
Turnout		129,404	70.17%	3.19%
Registered electors		195,527		
DMK gain from AIADMK		Swing	-5.22%	

=== 1991 ===
1991 Tamil Nadu Legislative Assembly election: Mettupalayam
Party	Candidate	Votes	%	±%
AIADMK	L. Sulochana	72,912	60.82%	+38.52
DMK	B. Arunkumar	31,173	26.01%	New
BJP	Nandakumar Sri	7,017	5.85%	New
	M. R. Sivasamy	6,325	5.28%	New
PMK	R. Palanichami	628	0.52%	New
Margin of victory		41,739	34.82%	28.91%
Turnout		119,873	66.98%	−8.31%
Registered electors		186,264		
AIADMK gain from INC		Swing	32.61%	

=== 1989 ===
1989 Tamil Nadu Legislative Assembly election: Mettupalayam
Party	Candidate	Votes	%	±%
INC	V. Gopalakrishnan	34,194	28.21%	New
AIADMK	V. Jayaraman	27,034	22.30%	−37.29
JP	C. V. Kandasamy	25,987	21.44%	New
India Farmers and Tailers Party	M. R. Sivasamy	18,097	14.93%	New
AIADMK	D. K. Duraisamy	11,041	9.11%	−50.49
Independent	Sunbban	1,480	1.22%	New
Independent	C. Saminathan	774	0.64%	New
Margin of victory		7,160	5.91%	−13.74%
Turnout		121,209	75.29%	−0.99%
Registered electors		165,095		
INC gain from AIADMK		Swing	-31.38%	

=== 1984 ===
1984 Tamil Nadu Legislative Assembly election: Mettupalayam
Party	Candidate	Votes	%	±%
AIADMK	M. Chinnaraj	61,951	59.60%	+0.63
DMK	M. Mathiyan	41,527	39.95%	New
Margin of victory		20,424	19.65%	0.16%
Turnout		103,952	76.28%	16.96%
Registered electors		142,909		
AIADMK hold		Swing	0.63%	

=== 1980 ===
1980 Tamil Nadu Legislative Assembly election: Mettupalayam
Party	Candidate	Votes	%	±%
AIADMK	S. Palanisamy	48,266	58.96%	+26.59
INC	K. Vijayan	32,311	39.47%	+15.09
Independent	S. K. Ponnusamy	593	0.72%	New
Margin of victory		15,955	19.49%	12.88%
Turnout		81,860	59.32%	−1.14%
Registered electors		140,096		
AIADMK hold		Swing	26.59%	

=== 1977 ===
1977 Tamil Nadu Legislative Assembly election: Mettupalayam
Party	Candidate	Votes	%	±%
AIADMK	S. Palanisamy	26,029	32.37%	New
JP	T. T. S. Thippaiah	20,717	25.76%	New
INC	M. K. Kembaia Gowder	19,604	24.38%	New
DMK	O. Arumugasamy	11,757	14.62%	−41.46
Independent	V. Subramani	1,121	1.39%	New
Independent	G. N. Shanmugam	817	1.02%	New
Margin of victory		5,312	6.61%	−5.55%
Turnout		80,410	60.46%	−12.87%
Registered electors		135,224		
AIADMK gain from DMK		Swing	-23.71%	

=== 1971 ===
1971 Tamil Nadu Legislative Assembly election: Mettupalayam
Party	Candidate	Votes	%	±%
DMK	M. C. Thooyamani	39,013	56.08%	+15.21
Independent	Ramaswami	30,553	43.92%	New
Margin of victory		8,460	12.16%	7.62%
Turnout		69,566	73.33%	−0.70%
Registered electors		99,930		
DMK gain from INC		Swing	10.66%	

=== 1967 ===
1967 Madras Legislative Assembly election: Mettupalayam
Party	Candidate	Votes	%	±%
INC	T. T. S. Thippiah	29,709	45.42%	−1.49
DMK	Thooyamani	26,736	40.87%	New
CPI	K. Veellingiri	8,967	13.71%	−21.65
Margin of victory		2,973	4.55%	−7.00%
Turnout		65,412	74.03%	−0.17%
Registered electors		93,585		
INC hold		Swing	-1.49%	

=== 1962 ===
1962 Madras Legislative Assembly election: Mettupalayam
Party	Candidate	Votes	%	±%
INC	N. Shanmugasundaram	25,398	46.90%	−2.46
CPI	K. Vellingiri	19,145	35.36%	New
SWA	K. R. Krishnasami	7,655	14.14%	New
Independent	Saminatha Chettiar	1,481	2.74%	New
Independent	M. Nagappan	470	0.87%	New
Margin of victory		6,253	11.55%	8.92%
Turnout		54,149	74.21%	14.18%
Registered electors		76,665		
INC hold		Swing	-2.46%	

=== 1957 ===
1957 Madras Legislative Assembly election: Mettupalayam
Party	Candidate	Votes	%	±%
INC	D. Raghubadhi Devi	20,690	49.37%	+38.11
Independent	Madhannan	19,587	46.74%	New
Independent	C. Swaminatha Chettiar	1,632	3.89%	New
Margin of victory		1,103	2.63%	−5.36%
Turnout		41,909	60.02%	−54.62%
Registered electors		69,821		
INC gain from Independent		Swing	30.12%	

=== 1952 ===
1952 Madras Legislative Assembly election: Mettupalayam
Party	Candidate	Votes	%	±%
Independent	Kempi Gowder	30,687	19.24%	New
INC	Abdul Salam, Azad	17,946	11.25%	New
Independent	Mahadevan	3,059	1.92%	New
Independent	Saminatha Chetty	1,139	0.71%	New
Margin of victory		12,741	7.99%	
Turnout		159,462	114.65%	
Registered electors		139,088		
Independent win (new seat)				
