= Karinkallathani =

- Town
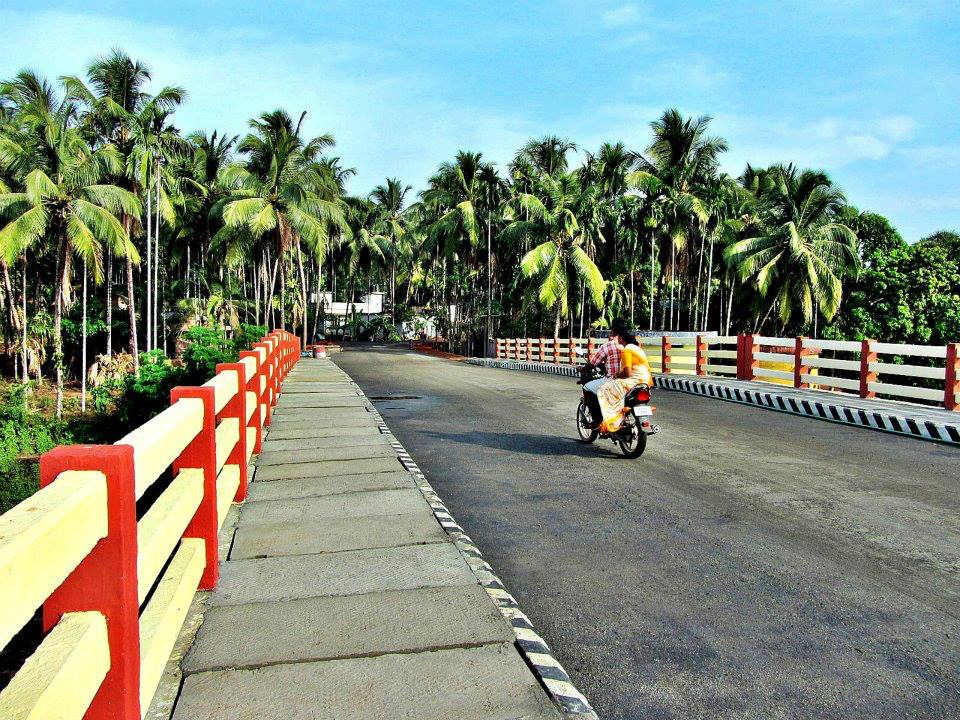
- Muriyankanni Bridge, 6 km (3¾ miles) south-east of the village
- Interactive map of Karinkallathani
- Coordinates: 10.9537°N 76.320718°E
- Country: India
- State: Kerala
- District: Malappuram and Palakkad

Languages
  - Official: Malayalam, English
- Time zone: UTC+5:30 (IST)
- PIN: 679341
- Nearest city: Perinthalmanna

Karinkallathani is a town in Perinthalmanna taluk of the Malappuram district of the Indian state of Kerala.

== Geography ==
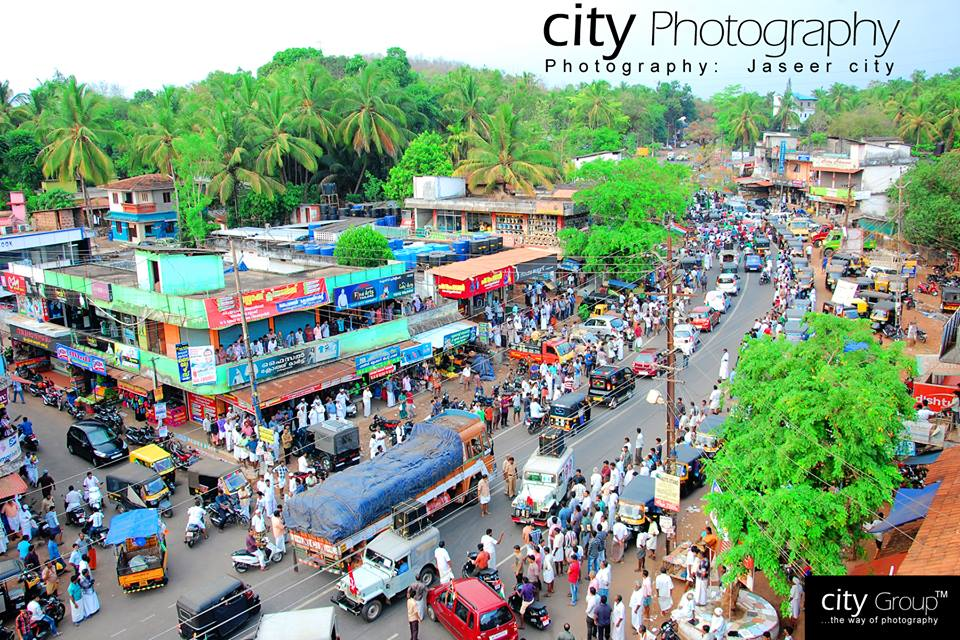
Karinkallathani town

Karinkallathani is situated in between Perinthalmanna and Mannarkkad at the border of the Malappuram and Palakkad districts, along the National Highway 213 (Kozhikode-Palakkad), which crosses the Thootha-Vettathur Road in Karinkallathani.

== Name ==
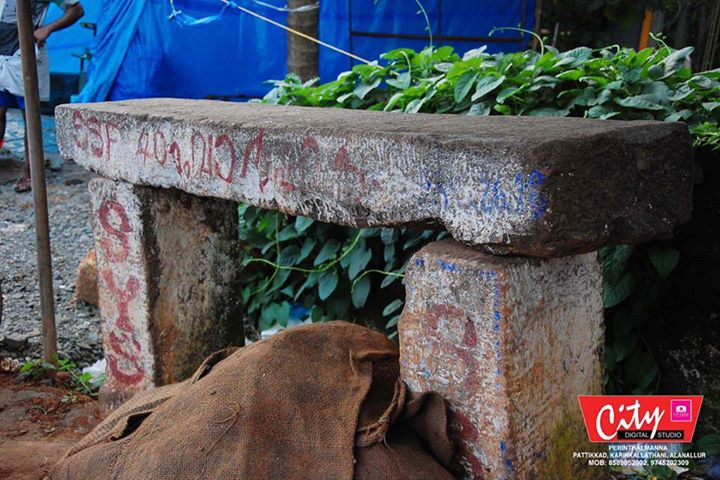
Stone bench (athani) in Karinkallathani

The name Karinkallathani is derived from the Malayalam word athani, also known as chumaduthangi, which is a heavy stone bench used in the market for supporting the weight of goods in olden days.

== Economy ==
A petrol station of the Indian Oil Corporation serves the traffic on the Palakkad-Kozhikode National Highway, which passes through Karinkallathani. Notable shops in the area include Safa Jewellery, Karayil Fancy and Home Needs, Vasantham Sarees, K Company and Aminia Furniture Shope. St. Mary's hospital is located to the west of the village, near Maruti Auto.

The leading banks in the area are the Federal Bank, the Thazhekkod Co-Operative Urban Bank and the State Bank of Travancore.

== Demographics ==
Major language spoken is Malayalam. Hindi and English are also widely understood and spoken as official languages, while Tamil and Arabic are less commonly used.

The population is predominantly Muslim, along with a sizeable Hindu population and small Christian population. Karinkallathani also has a small number of Tamils, mainly from rural districts of Tamil Nadu and migrants from North Indian states like Bihar, Jharkhand and Uttar Pradesh etc. who are engaged in labour and construction work.

== Culture ==
Karinkallathani village is a predominantly Muslim populated area. Hindus exist in comparatively smaller numbers. So the culture of the locality is based upon Muslim traditions. Duff Muttu, Kolkali, and Aravanamuttu are common folk arts of this locality. There are many libraries attached to mosques giving a rich source of Islamic studies. Most of the books are written in Arabi-Malayalam which is a version of the Malayalam language written in Arabic script. People gather in mosques for the evening prayer and continue to sit there after the prayers discussing social and cultural issues. Business and family issues are also sorted out during these evening meetings.

The Hindu minority of this area keeps their rich traditions by celebrating various festivals in their temples. Hindu rituals are done here with a regular devotion like other parts of Kerala.

== Transportation ==
Karinkallathani village connects to other parts of India through Perinthalmanna town and Mannarkkad town. The southern stretch connects to Kochi and Thiruvananthapuram.

The nearest Railway station is at Angadippuram (15 km) The nearest major railway station is at Shoranur (30 km). The nearest airport is Calicut International Airport (56 km).

== Religion ==
Jama Masjid is the congregational mosque of the village. Sree Panamkurrissi Kshethram is a Hindu temple south east of the village.

== Schools ==
- Fatimah Memorial High School
- ECS computer education
- Winstud Academy Karinkallathani
- AIS English Medium School (Vettathur Rd)
