= Mettupalayam taluk =

Coordinates: 11.3000°N 76.9500°E

Mettupalayam
- Taluk
- Interactive map of Mettupalayam
- Country: India
- State: Tamil Nadu
- District: Coimbatore

Mettupalayam taluk is a taluk of Coimbatore district of the Indian state of Tamil Nadu. The headquarters of the taluk is the town of Mettupalayam.

== Demographics ==
According to the 2011 census, the taluk of Mettupalayam had a population of 259,633 with 129,299 males and 130,334 females. There were 1,008 women for every 1,000 men. The taluk had a literacy rate of 71.93%. Child population in the age group below 6 years were 10,571 Males and 10,259 Females.

== See also ==
- Odanthurai
