= Timeline of Coimbatore =

This is a timeline list of major events in the history of Coimbatore, a major city in the Indian state of Tamil Nadu.

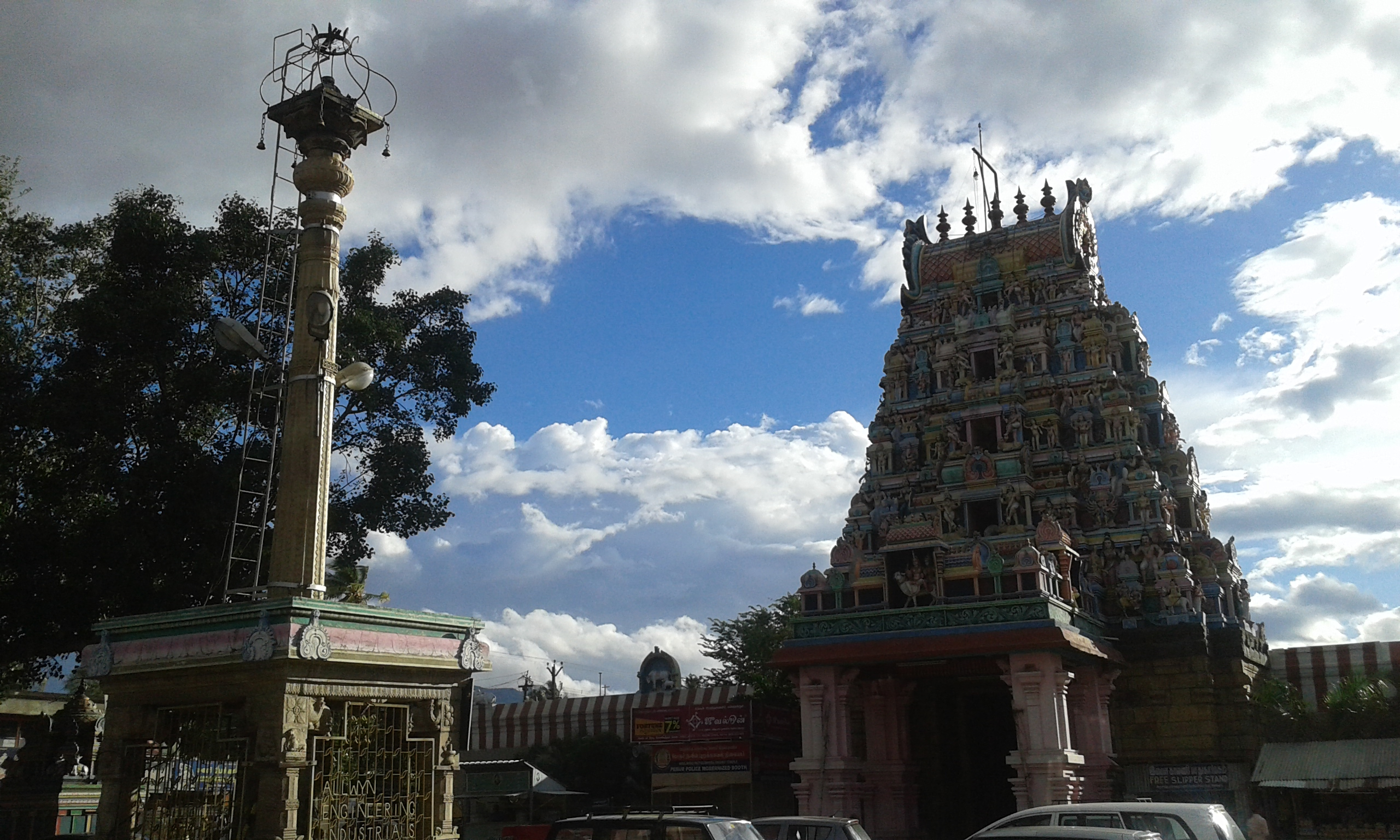
Perur Pateeswarar Temple was built in the 6th century CE

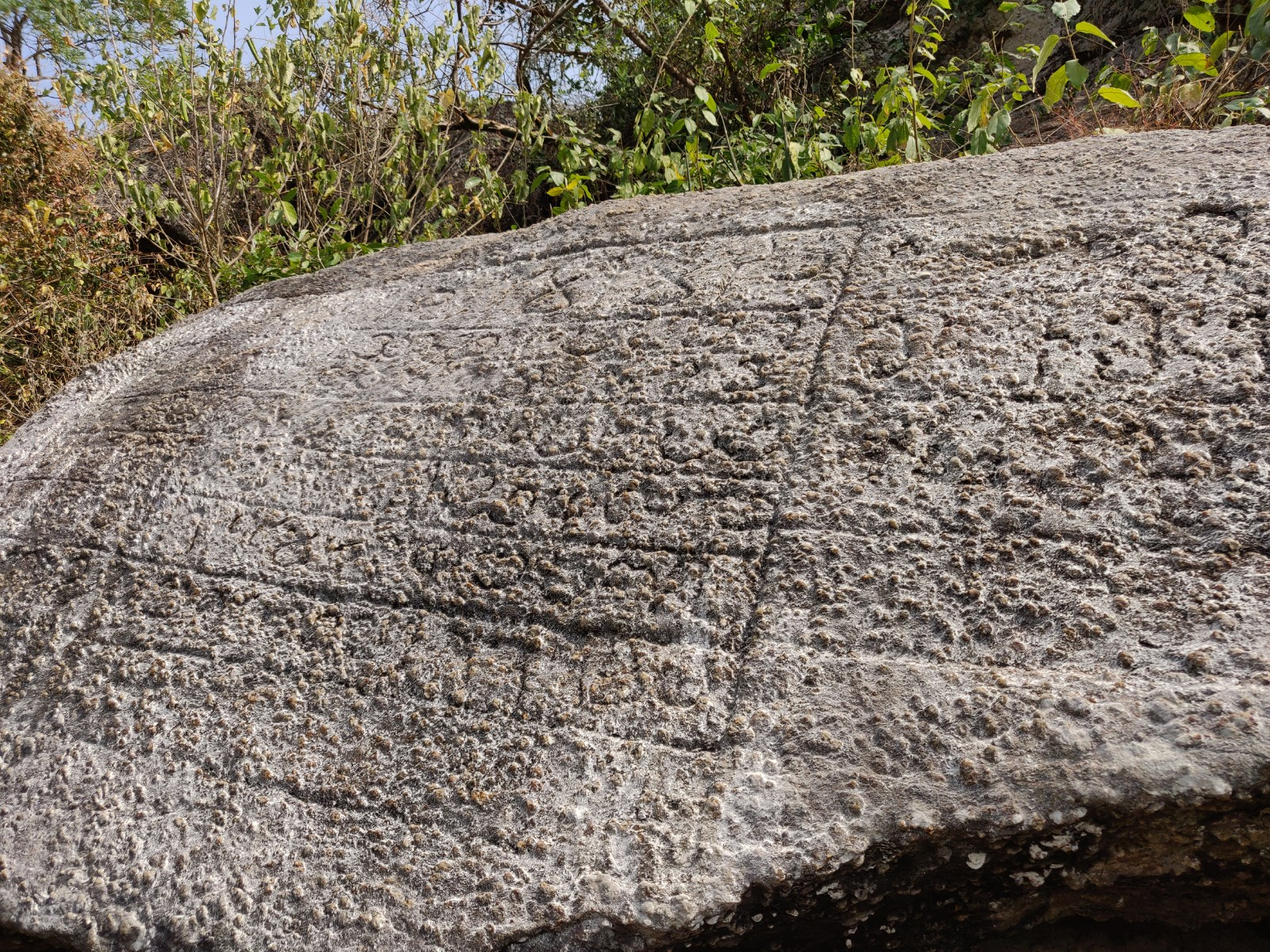
Rajakesari Peruvazhi is an ancient Chola highway used for Roman and early European trade. The 10th century inscription mentions repairs made by the Chola king.

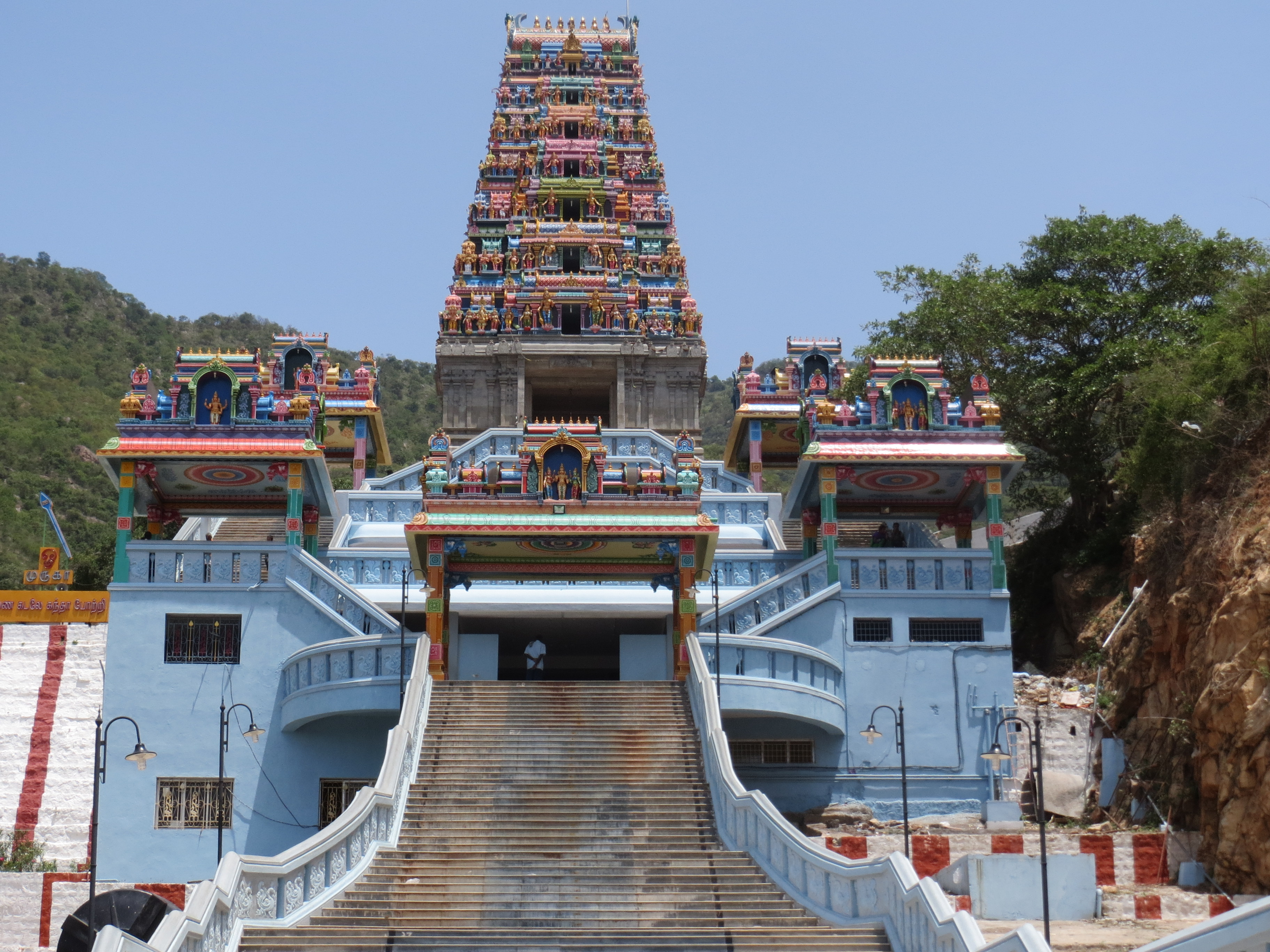
Marudhamalai temple was constructed in the 12th century CE

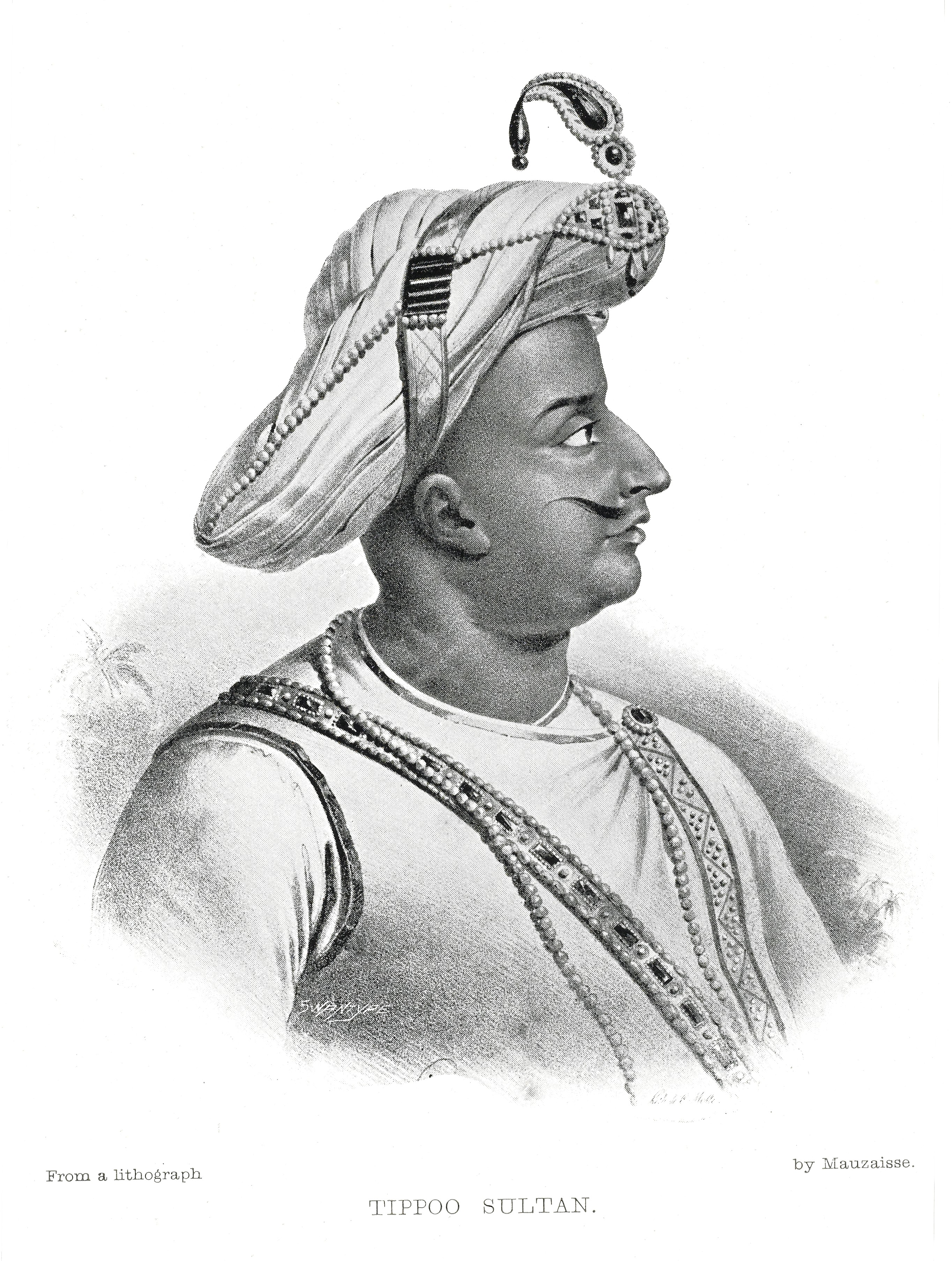
Tipu Sultan resided in Coimbatore occasionally. He built a provincial palace and the Kottaimedu mosque in the second half of the 18th century.

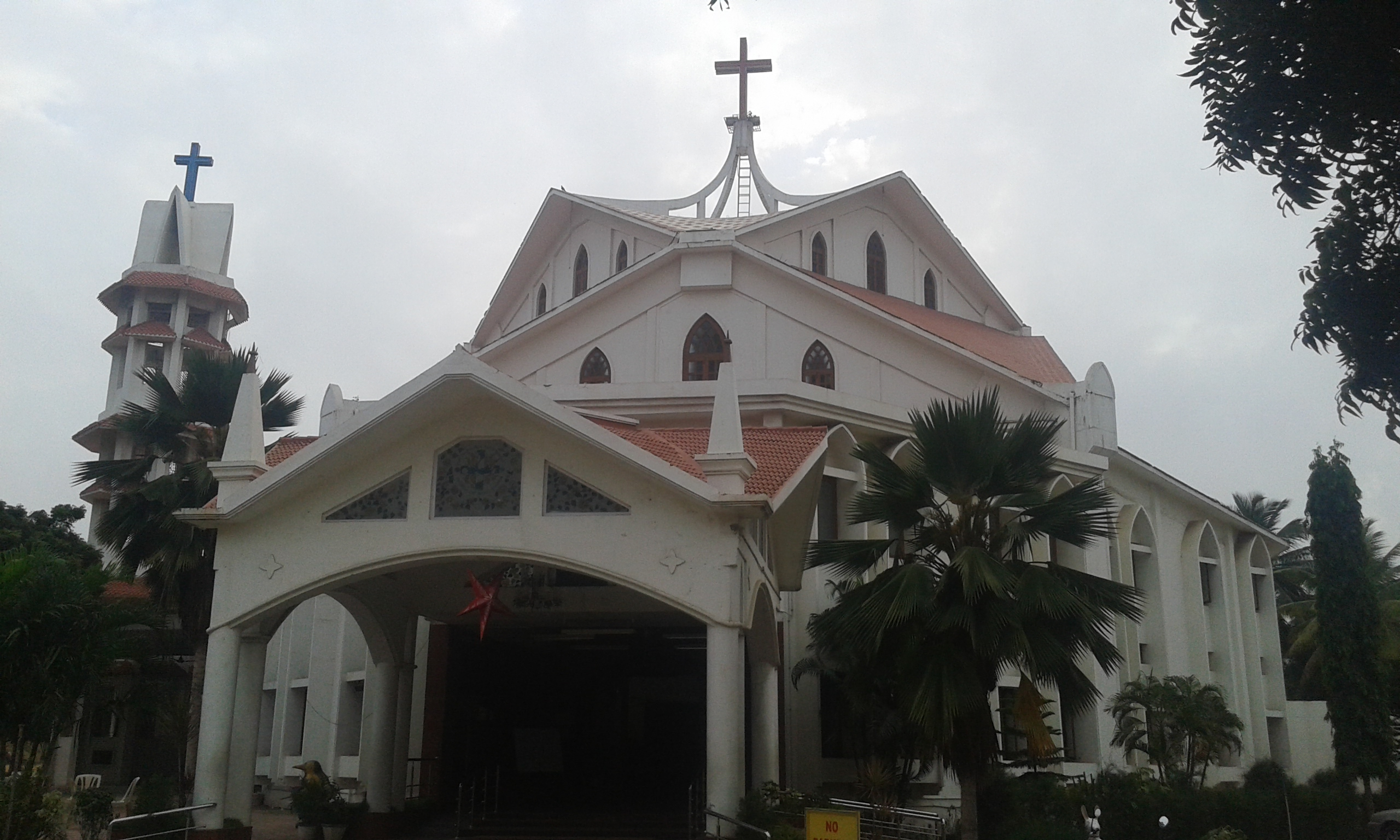
CSI Immanuel Church, one of the oldest churches in Coimbatore, established in 1830.

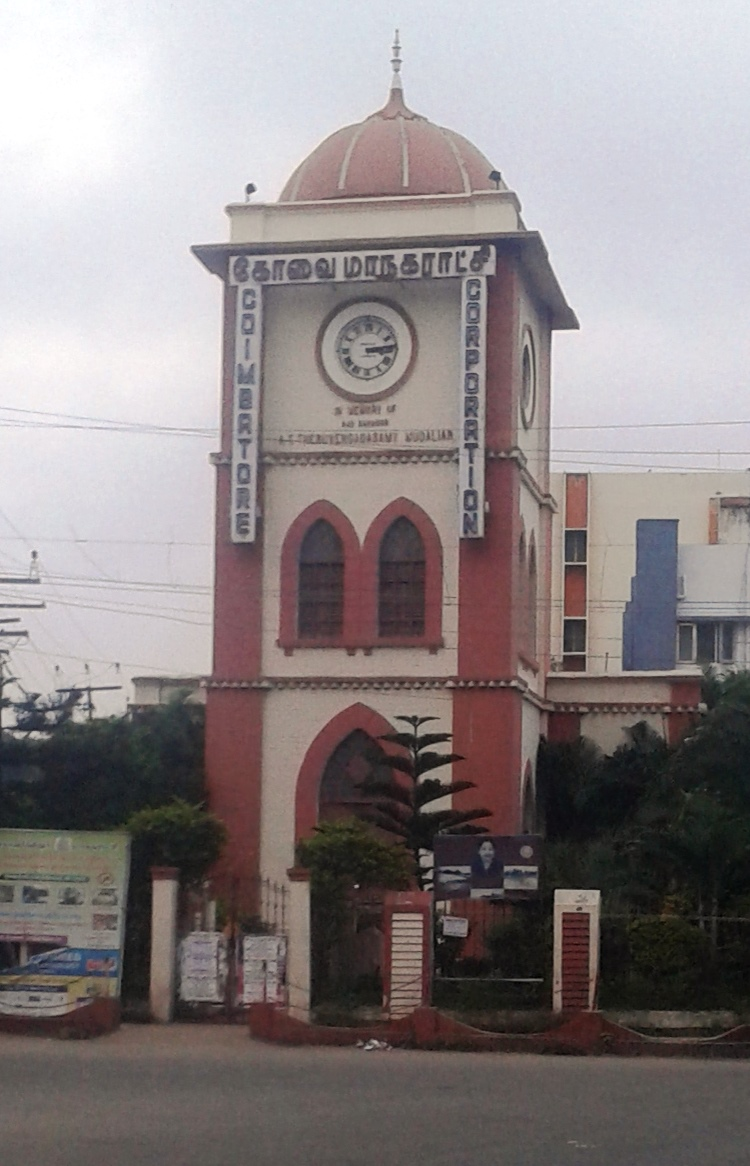
Clock tower installed in memory of A.T. Thiruvenkataswamy Mudaliar in 1877.

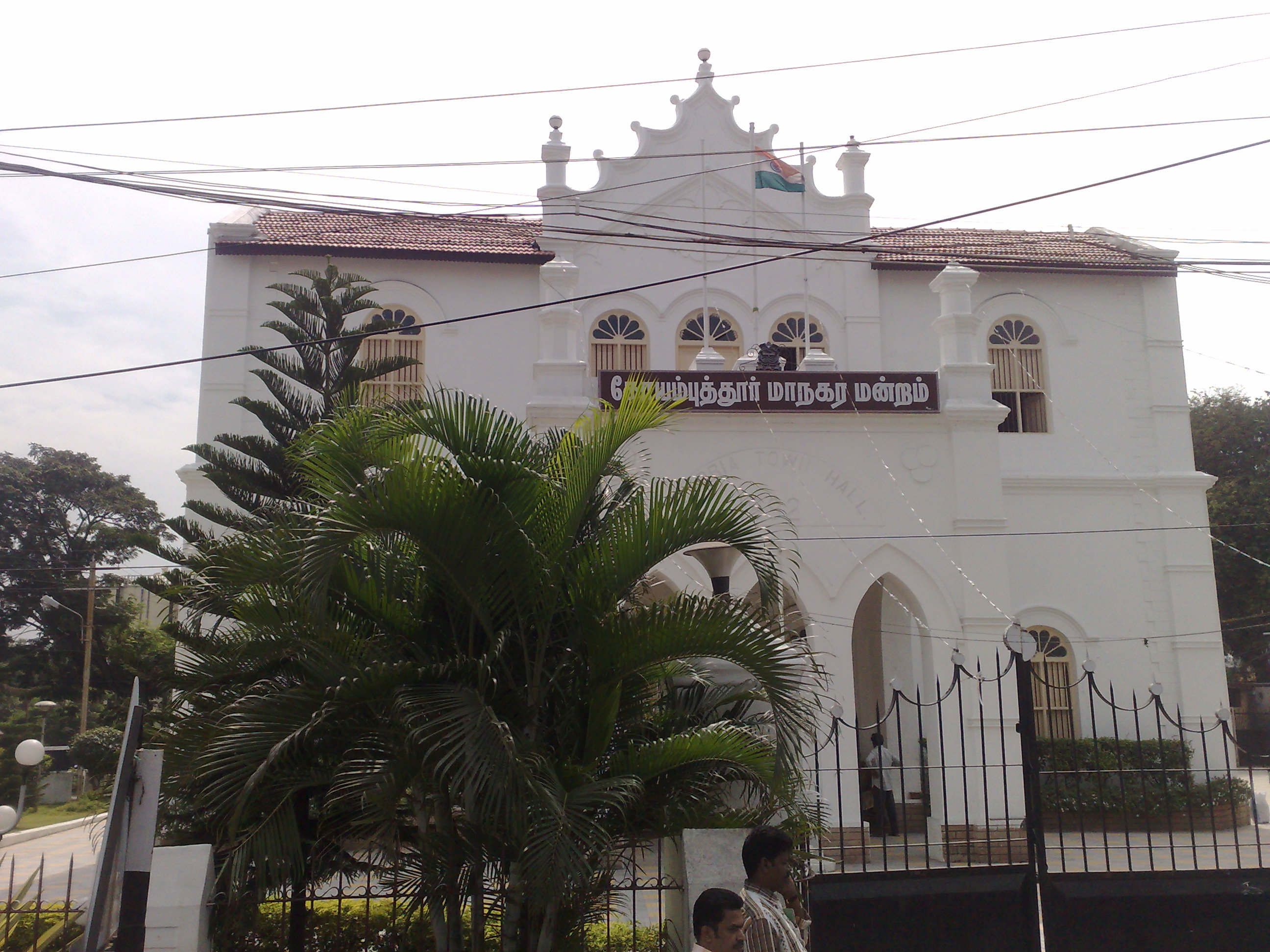
Town Hall launched in 1892.

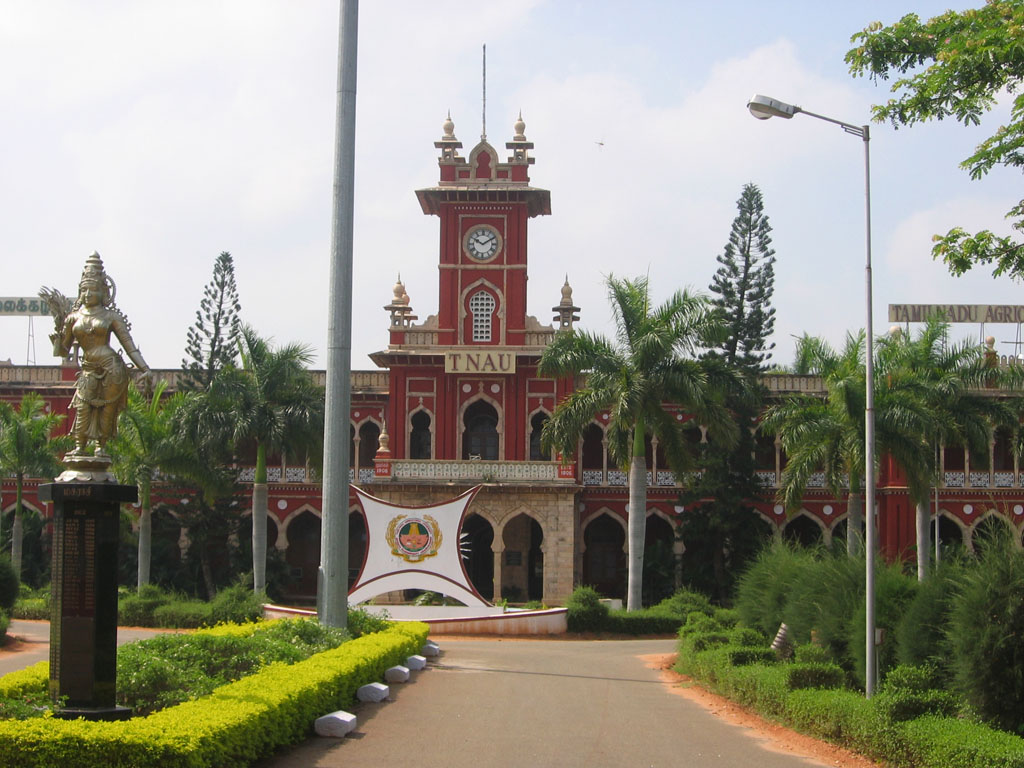
Saidapet Agricultural School moved to Coimbatore in 1906, becomes Madras Agricultural College and later Tamil Nadu Agricultural University in 1971.

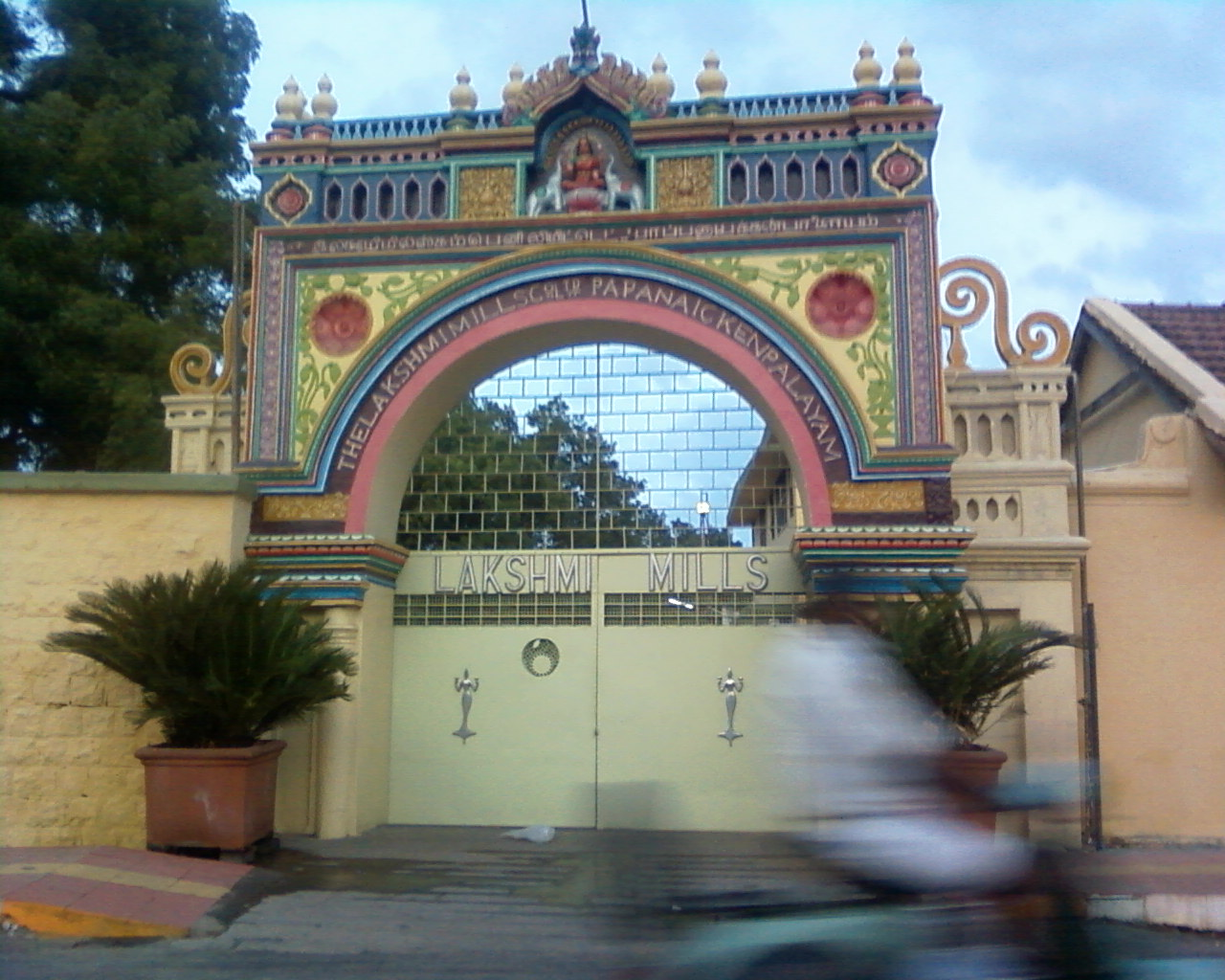
Lakshmi Mills, one of the earliest spinning mills, is inaugurated in 1910 by G. Kuppuswami Naidu.

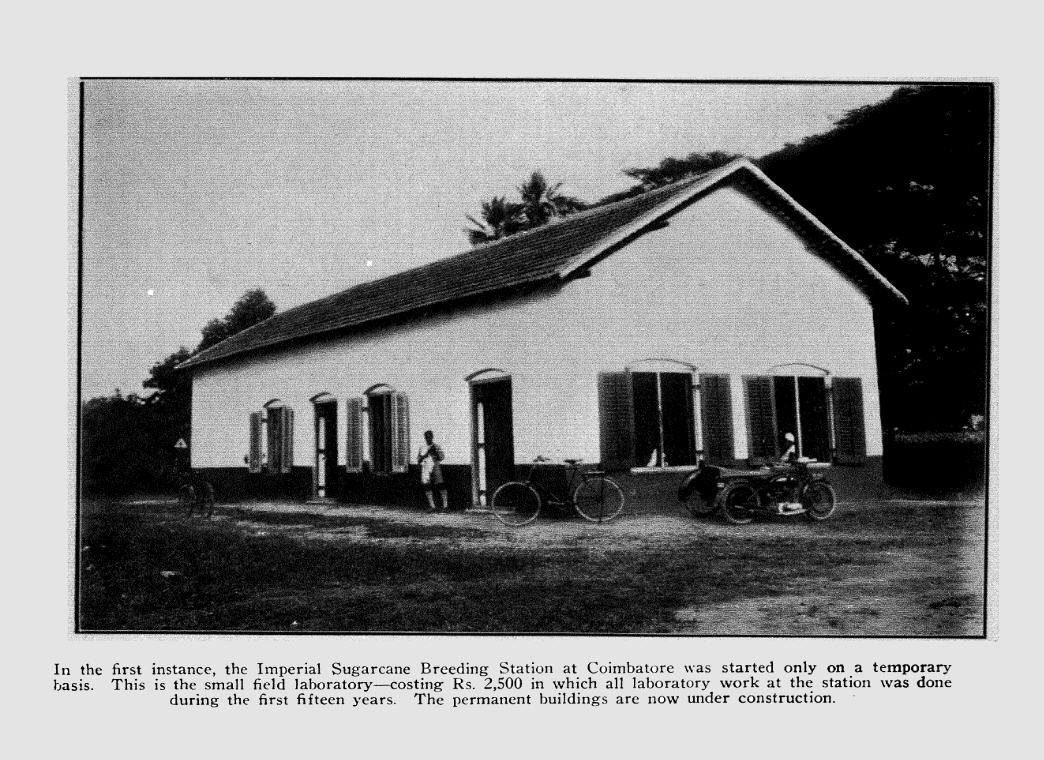
Sugarcane Breeding Institute was established in 1912. The sugarcane varieties developed at Coimbatore go on to support sugarcane industries of 22 countries globally by the 1960s.

Central Studios was started in 1935 by B. Rangaswamy Naidu, Samikannu Vincent, and others.

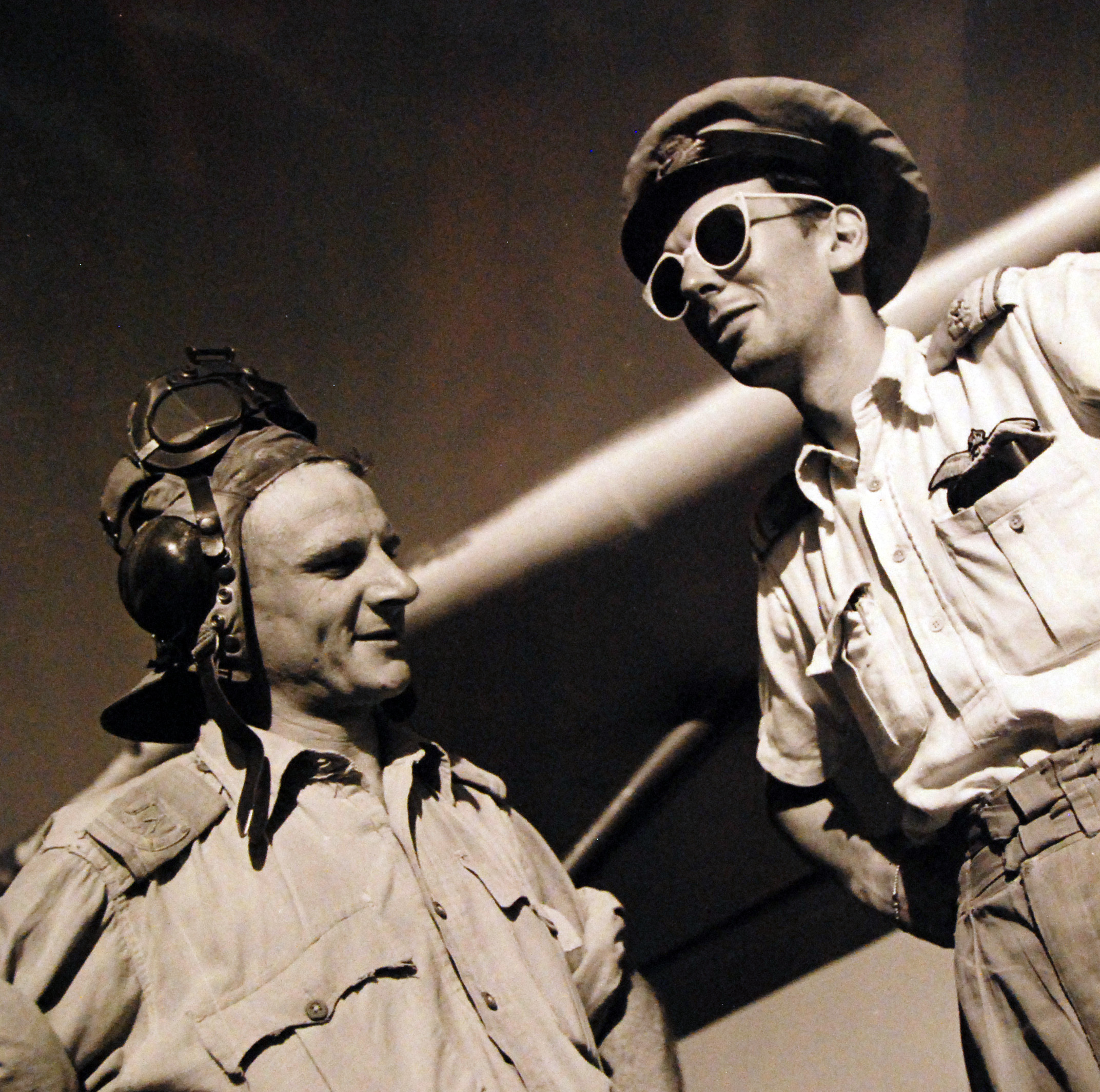
US planes from U.S. Lend-Leases are put into commission at HMS Vairi. During WW2 Coimbatore had two British bases: HMS Garuda (at Peelamedu) and HMS Vairi (Sulur)

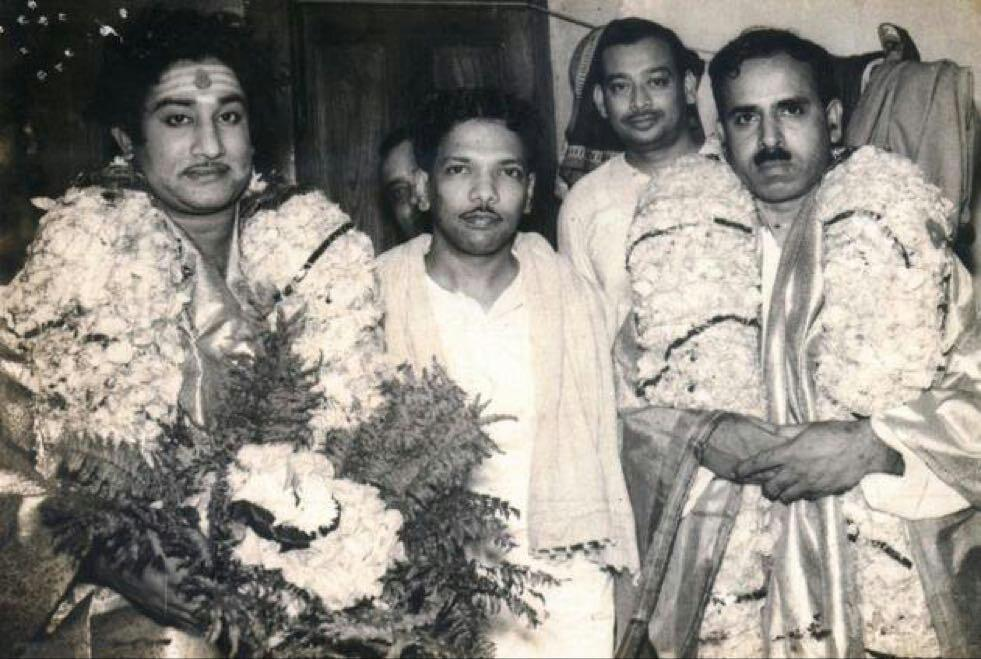
Many Tamil Cinema greats had association with the early Coimbatore film industry. MGR's hit movie Malaikkallan was shot at Pakshiraja Studios in 1954. Sivaji Ganesan's famous film Maragatham was shot in 1959.

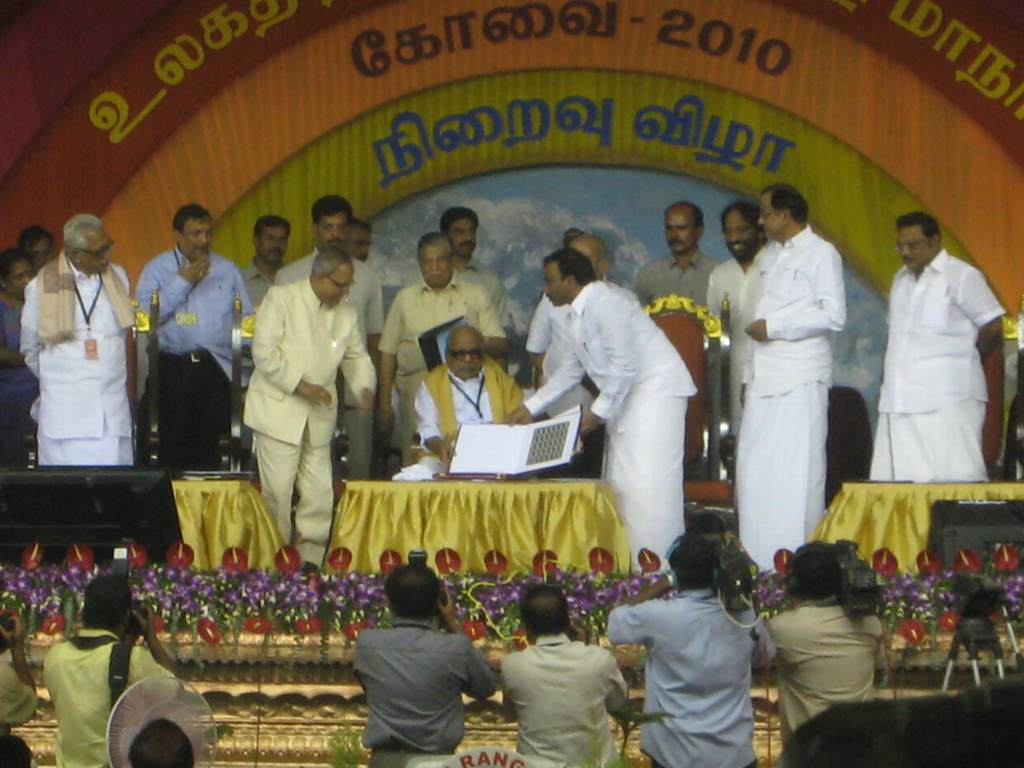
Stamp release at World Classical Tamil Conference 2010.

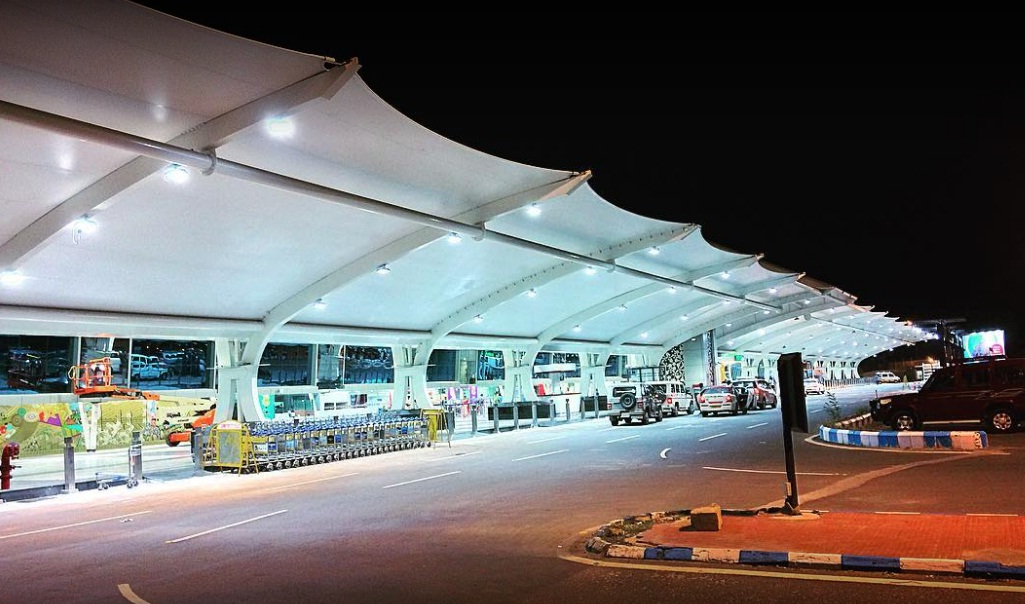
Coimbatore airport becomes an International Airport in 2012 after Cabinet approval.

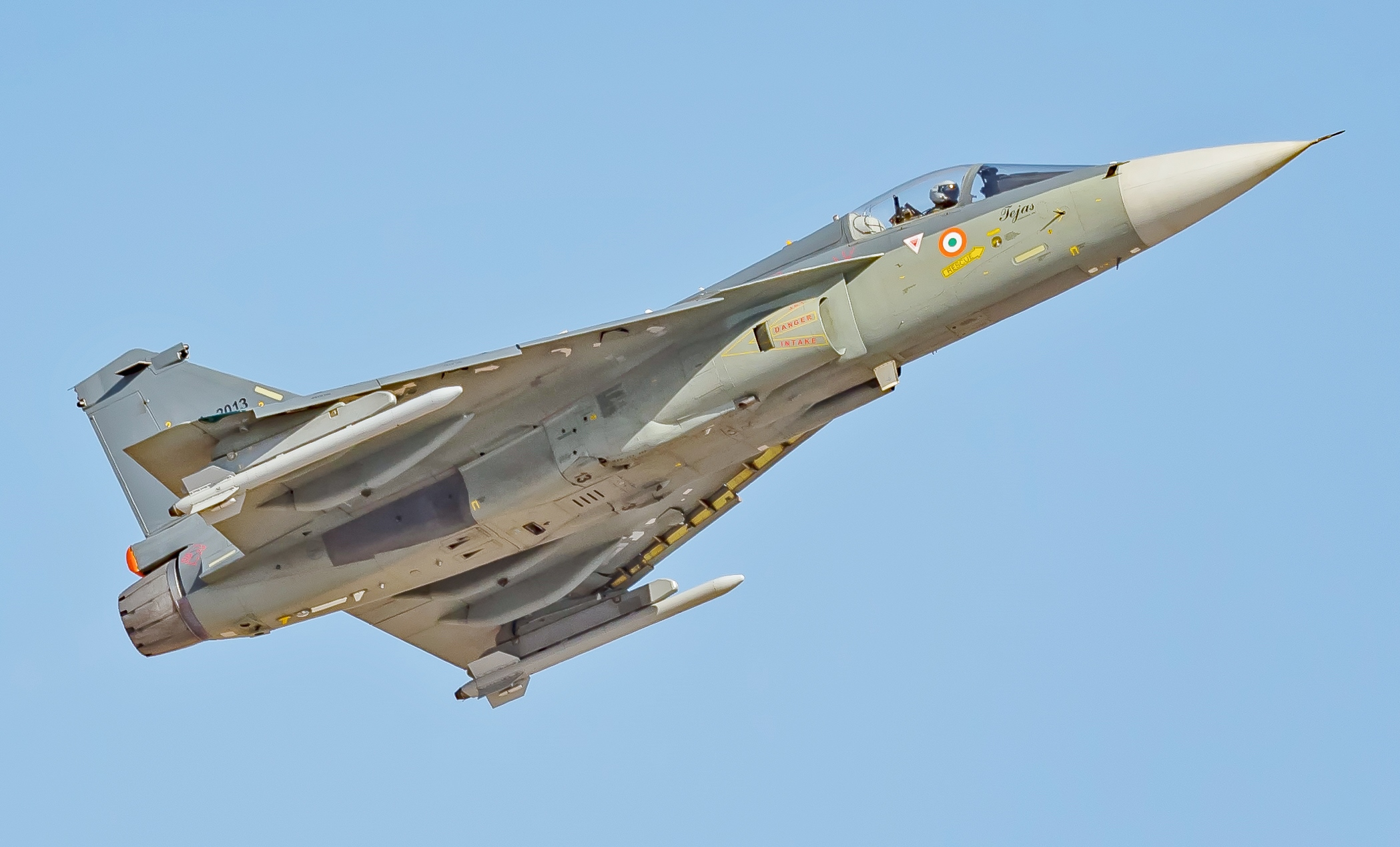
Tejas Squadron (The Flying Daggers) shifts base from Bengaluru to Sulur Air Force Station in Jul, 2018.

== Early history ==
=== BCE ===
- ~450 BCE - Ancient rock art prevalent in Kovanur, Perianaickenpalayam taluk. Kovanur is 30 km northwest of Coimbatore.

=== 1st to 4th century CE ===
- The region around Coimbatore was ruled by the Cheras during Sangam period. It served as the eastern entrance to the Palakkad Gap, the principal trade route between the west coast and Tamil Nadu.
- The Kosar tribe mentioned in the second century CE Tamil epic Silappathikaram and other poems in Sangam literature is associated with the Coimbatore region.
- The region was located along an ancient Roman trade route that extended from Muziris to Arikamedu.

=== 6th century ===
- Perur Pateeswarar Temple mandapam was built by Pallava king Narasinga Potharanya II (Rajasimha Varman). (The mandapam has fourteen huge pillars carved intricately with images of the deities.)

=== 9th century ===
- Sundarar (Nayanmar saint) visits Perur temple.

=== 10th century ===
- The medieval Cholas conquered Kongu Nadu in the 10th century.
- Rajakesari Peruvazhi, a highway running through the region that was reinforced by Chola king Aditya I. As per inscriptions in both Tamil & Vattezhuthu (verse) found in Sundakkamuthur record this. (The peruvazhi connected west and east coasts. It also supported trade between Cholas and the Romans over time.)

=== 12th century ===
- Marudhamalai temple is constructed.

=== 15th century ===
- Much of Tamil Nadu came under the rule of the Vijayanagara Empire by the 15th century.

=== 16th century ===
- 1511: Vyasaraja the Madhva saint and scholar visits Coimbatore and its neighbourhood. The saint installed the Hanuman idol on R. G. Street. (The saint also performed his Chaturmasya Vratam here.)
- In the 1550s, the Madurai Nayaks, who were the military chiefs of the Vijaynagara Empire, took charge of the region.

=== 17th century ===
- Madurai Nayaks established their territory as an independent kingdom after the fall of the Vijayanagara Empire in the 17th century. (They introduced the Palayakkarar system by which the Kongu Nadu region was divided into 24 Palayams.)

== 18th century ==
- 1776: Tipu Sultan builds Kottaimedu mosque in Coimbatore, 4 years before he takes over as the Ruler of Mysore kingdom.
- 1789: Tipu Sultan amasses army in Coimbatore (Dec 1789). On 28 December Tipu's army attacks the Kingdom of Travancore led by Raman Kesavan Pillai in the Battle of Nedumkotta.
- 1790: Records of Tipu's provincial palace in Coimbatore. As per Francis Skelly's despatch to Major General Charles Stuart on 1 August 1790 the existence of an "excellent" palace is recorded. (The place, missing in modern times, had "large and lofty" chambers, and walls covered with polished chunam that looked like marble. The palace also had valuable ivory and sandal wood objects.)
- 1790: British East India company takes Coimbatore. The company led by General William Medows take control of Coimbatore (which was evacuated by Tipu) and a significant part of Coimbatore district. (Tipu pushes back and gains territory but the company retains control of Coimbatore).
- 1791: Coimbatore fort destroyed: Tipu's Armies led by Qamar ud-Din defeated the British East India company in the Siege of Coimbatore. (The fort was built during Vijayanagar times. Kottaimedu area of Coimbatore was the location of the erstwhile fort).
- 1799: Following the defeat of Tipu Sultan in the Anglo-Mysore Wars, the British East India Company annexed Coimbatore to the Madras Presidency in 1799.

== 19th century ==
- 1801: The Coimbatore region played a prominent role in the Second Poligar War (1801) when it was under the area of operations of Dheeran Chinnamalai.
- 1804: Coimbatore was made a district and as the district headquarters on 24 November. (The Coimbatore district then included the current districts of Nilgiris, Tirupur, Erode, and parts of Kerala.)
- 1830: CSI Immanuel Church established in 1830.
- 1860: St. Michael's Higher Secondary School was established.
- 1862: Podanur Railway junction built. It is the oldest in the entire southern region. (Even Chennai Central Junction was built nine years after Podanur. Many freedom fighters have visited.)
- 1862: Stanes Anglo Indian Higher School was established.
- 1865: Coimbatore Prison is partially occupied and operations begin while construction continues.
- 1866: Municipality of Coimbatore was established in 1866 according to the Town Improvements Act of 1865 with Rober Stanes, a renowned industrialist as its first chairman. (The early days of the municipality were difficult as it had to tackle plague epidemics and earthquakes.)
- 1867: The first group of students appeared for the SSLC Examinations from Coimbatore.
- 1867: St. Michael's cathedral consecrated. (8 April)
- 1872: CSI All Souls Church consecrated on 27 January 1872. It cost Rs 20,000 and took 6 years to build.
- 1877: Clock tower installed at Town Hall in memory of A.T. Thiruvenkataswamy Mudaliar.
- 1880: St. Francis Anglo Indian Girls High School was established.
- 1880: Coimbatore Kalanidhi, one of the earliest Tamil newspapers was started by S. P. Narasimhalu Naidu. (The newspaper was a contemporary of the 'Salem Desabhimani' (1880) and predates the 'Swadesamitran' (1982)).
- 1883: The first financial institution/bank Coimbatore Janopakara Nidhi Limited setup by C. Sadasivam Mudaliar (22 June 1883). (A corpus of One lakh rupees, 2,000 shares of Rs. 50 each, was deployed at inauguration.)
- 1892: Victoria Town Hall built in the city with contributions from the Municipality and citizens. (S. P. Narasimhalu Naidu contributed Rs. 1,000 and helped raise funds from the public for the construction of the building.)

== 20th century ==
- 1900: Nallepilly earthquake impacts Coimbatore on 8 February 1900. 6 on Reichter scale. (Clock tower and Central jail had damages. The eastern bell tower of St. Michael's Cathedral also collapsed.)
- 1903: Plague hits Coimbatore.
- 1904: Plague deaths in Coimbatore total 1122 in the year.
- 1908: V. O. Chidambaram Pillai jailed at Coimbatore Central Prison for two years. He was put to hard labour and yolked to an oil press earning him the name Chekkiluththa Chemmal.
- 1909: Plague again in Coimbatore. 1071 people die from plague.
- 1912: Sugarcane Breeding Institute, was established by the Department of Agriculture, Madras Presidency. Dr. Charles Alfred Barber, botanist, was the first Head of the Institute & Government Sugarcane Expert.
- 1914: Samikannu Vincent builds first theatre in South India - the Variety Hall Talkies near Town Hall, now called Delite theatre.
- 1916: Sambandhan Mudaliar becomes Chairman of the Coimbatore Municipality. (Sambhandan street is later named after him.)
- 1917: Plague impacts Coimbatore.
- 1921: C.S. Rathinasabapathy Mudaliar becomes Chairman of the Coimbatore Municipality for 14 years from 1921. (DB road (Divan Bahadur) is later named after him. R. S. Puram is also named after him.)
- 1921: Mapilla Wagon tragedy at Podanur. 67 dead bodies of protesters tumbled out of a goods wagon in a train coming from Malabar region. The victims had suffocated in the wagon and they were those arrested by the Malabar police earlier during the violence. (19 November 1921)
- 1925: Mahatma Gandhi visits Coimbatore, arrives at Podanur Junction on 19 March 1925.
- 1928: Moses Gnanabaranam Eye Hospital instituted. Arogyaswamy Pillai gave away his bungalow, Arogya Vilas on Big Bazaar Street to make way for the hospital in memory of his late father.
- 1929: Siruvani water reaches Coimbatore on 26 April, thanks to Rathinasabapathy Mudaliar, after nearly 9 years of work on the project.
- 1934: Jupiter Pictures, a feature film production company, was founded by M. Somasundaram and S.K. Mohideen.
- 1934: Municipality elects its first woman chairman, K. Thankamma Jacob.
- 1935: Central Studios is started by B. Rangaswamy Naidu and others.
- 1940: Coimbatore Domestic Airport is opened for operating small aircraft.
- 1940: Coimbatore District Chess Association is formed. It is the earliest chess organisation in India.
- 1941: World War 2 evacuees camp setup including Maltese, Greek and some Burmese.
- 1942: HMS Garuda was commissioned on 1 October 1942 at Peelamedu. It was a Royal Navy Aircraft repair yard with a capacity of 180 aircraft.
- 1943: Plague and Cholera outbreak in Coimbatore.
- 1944: US planes from U.S. Lend-Leases are put into commission at HMS Vairi received by the British (The Royal Navy Air Station in Sulur, Coimbatore.)
- 1945: Pakshiraja Studios is established by S. M. Sriramulu Naidu. (The studio made block buster movies like MGR starer Malaikkallan(1955) and Meena Kumari starer Azaad (1955).)
- 1945: Hellcats operate out of HMS Garuda (Peelamedu) between September and October. The Hellcats were from HMS Emperor, HMS Ameer and HMS Khedive.
- 1946: HMS Vairi was decommissioned on 1 April 1946.
- 1948: Nava India a Tamil daily founded by Prof P.R. Ramakrishnan (PRR) with V.N. Ramaswami as its Editor.
- 1950: Douglas DC-3 VT-CFK Plane crash near Kotagiri. On 13 December 1950, a Douglas DC-3 carrying 17 passengers and four crew from Bombay to Coimbatore, crashed into high ground near Kotagiri due to a navigational error, killing all on board.
- 1953: Coimbatore Rifle club inaugurated. (Has since generated many young champions)
- 1955: Nikita Khrushchev and Nikolai Bulganin visit the city. They visit Athar Jamad Masjid and a farm in city outskirts. (The farm is later called Bulganin Thottam.)
- 1960s: Coimbatore developed sugarcane varieties at Sugarcane Breeding Institute were supporting the sugarcane industries of 22 countries globally.
- 1965: VOC Park and Zoo inaugurated.
- 1966: All India Radio launches its Coimbatore broadcast from Chettipalayam transmission station on 18 December 1966.
- 1968: Hotel Annapoorna's first branch started by K. Dhamodarasamy Naidu. (They started modestly as a small shop at Kennedy theatre and expanded to 18+ branches.)
- 1971: Jawaharlal Nehru Stadium was constructed.
- 1976: 45 political prisoners were arrested during the emergency and jailed under Maintenance of Internal Security Act (MISA) on 31 January 1976 in the Coimbatore Central jail.
- 1981: Coimbatore upgraded to a municipal corporation in 1981, the third in Tamil Nadu.
- 1982: Bharathiar University established in Coimbatore.
- 1983: Inland Container Depot (ICD) begins operations at Irugur. Port Kochi functions as the outport.
- 1987: Coimbatore airport runway enhanced to accommodate larger aircraft like the Boeing 737.
- 1998: 12 blasts across 11 locations rock Coimbatore on 14 February 1998. 58 were killed and over 200 injured. (L. K. Advani, BJP leader, was in the city for election meetings.)

== 21st century ==
- 2009: Coimbatore Vizha inaugurated in 2009.
- 2010: World Classical Tamil Conference 2010 was held in the city from 23 to 27 June 2010. (The conference theme song was Semmozhiyaana Thamizh Mozhiyaam.)
- 2012: Corporation won the Best Corporation Award in Tamil Nadu.
- 2013: First Coimbatore Marathon kicks off on 7 October 2013. (8000+ Run in support of Coimbatore Cancer Foundation and enabled by Coimbatore Runners.)
- 2014: 100th anniversary of Variety Hall theatre (Delite Cinema).
- 2017: Coimbatore's Jawaharlal Nehru Stadium becomes the home ground of Chennai City Football Club.
- 2018: Tamilnadus's first Police Museum opened at the former Hamilton Club.
- 2018: Coimbatore Jallikattu was held after 38 years at Chettipalayam. 2,000 persons witnessed the sport with 300 players and 433 bulls.
- 2018: R.S. Puram Police station announced as the best station in India (among 14,850 stations) for 2017 by Union Home Minister Rajnath Singh.
- 2018: Tejas Squadron No. 45 (The Flying Daggers) moves base from Bengaluru to Sulur Air Force Station in Jul, 2018.

== See also ==
- History of Coimbatore
