= History of Coimbatore =

History of a city in Tamil Nadu, India

Coimbatore is the second largest city in the Indian state of Tamil Nadu. It is a major commercial centre and an industrial hub of Tamil Nadu and is known as the Manchester of South India.

== Early and medieval history ==
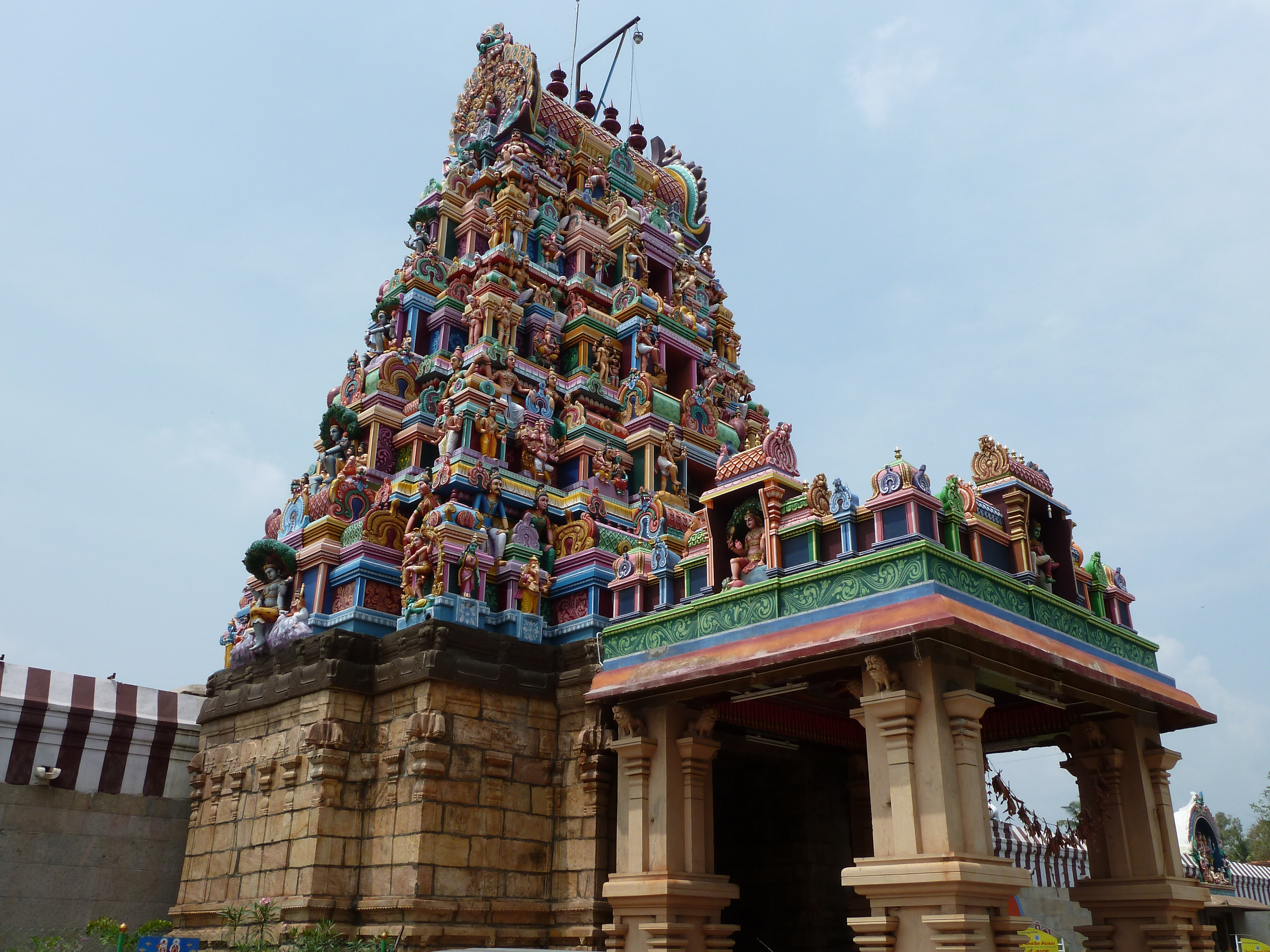
The Perur Pateeswarar Temple was built by Karikala Chola in the 2nd century CE.

The region was called Kongunadu ruled by semi-independent chieftains who owed nominal allegiance to the Chera kingdom and Kongu kings. Large quantities of Roman coins and other artifacts discovered in the region attest to the presence of Roman traders. The Coimbatore region is in the middle of the "Roman trail" that extended from Muziris to Arikamedu. At the end of the Sangam period, the region became a part of the Western Ganga kingdom.

During the 7th and 8th centuries, the Pandyas made repeated incursions into the Kongu region, while the Pallavas also became involved in the political affairs of Kongu. Arokiaswami notes that the Pallavas supported the Kongu rulers and intervened in the Kongu–Pandya conflict.The Medieval Cholas conquered the region in the 9th century CE. They constructed a highway called "Rajakesari Peruvazhi". During the 9th century CE, Coimbatore was ruled by Irula chief Kovan or Covan during whose reign the city of Coimbatore was constructed, allegedly at the behest of a Chera king who accompanied Sundarar on a pilgrimage to the Patteswarar Temple, Perur. Following the decline of the Cholas, Coimbatore was ruled for brief periods by the Pandyas.

== Anglo-Mysore Wars and Polygar Wars (1768-1802 CE) ==
Coimbatore was coveted by the Mysore sultans as well as British troops during the Anglo-Mysore Wars. The city was taken by the forces of the British East India Company in 1768 but were forced to abandon it due to treachery. Colonel Fullarton occupied the city in 1783 but later returned to Tipu Sultan as per the Treaty of Mangalore. At the beginning of the Third Mysore War, Coimbatore was, once again, taken by the British. Tipu Sultan besieged the city twice and repulsed in the first, he was successful in the second and Coimbatore surrendered in October 1791. The commanders of the garrison, Lieutenant Chalmers and Lieutenant Nash were taken as prisoners to Seringapatnam. Coimbatore fell to the British at the end of the Third Mysore War but was restored to Tipu Sultan at the cessation of hostilities. Coimbatore was eventually annexed by the British on the defeat and death of Tipu Sultan in 1799. Coimbatore was taken by the Polygars in 1800 and was an important stronghold in the Polygar Wars. It was made capital of Coimbatore district in 1865.

== British Colonial period (1802-1947 CE) ==
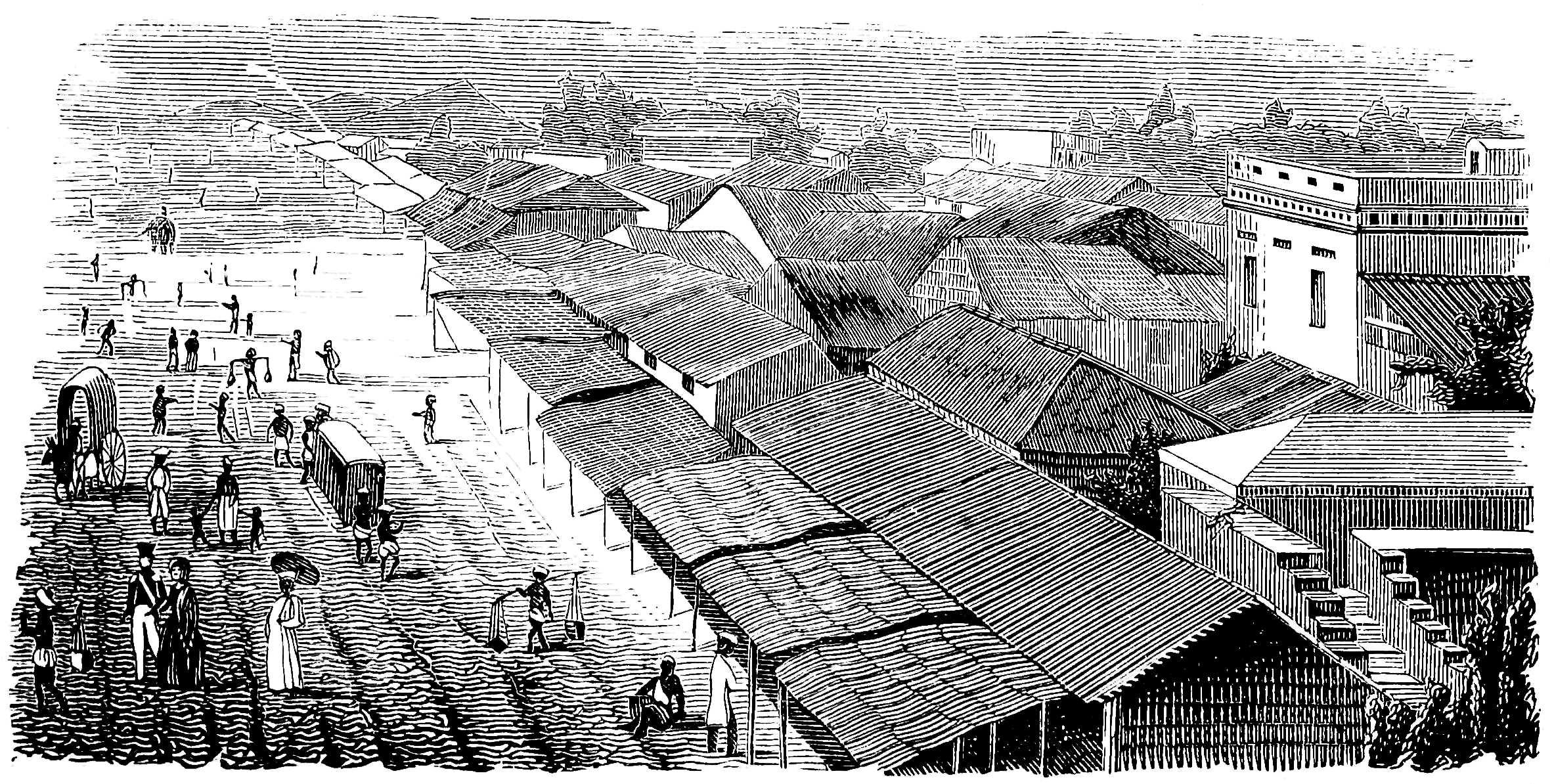
1855 illustration of Bazaar in Coimbatore

Sir Robert Stanes

The municipality of Coimbatore was created in 1866 as per the Town Improvements Act 1865 with Robert Stanes as the first chairman. Stanes pioneered the industrialization of Coimbatore, establishing a number of textile mills. As per the 1871 census, the first in India, Coimbatore had a population of 35,310 and was the tenth largest town in the Madras Presidency.

Coimbatore was severely affected by the Great Famine of 1876–78 and the Famine of 1891-92. An earthquake on 8 February 1900 killed nearly 30 inhabitants damaging the Coimbatore jail, a Roman Catholic chapel and many other buildings.

Coimbatore experienced a textile boom in the 1920s and 1930s partly abetted by the decline of the textile industry in Bombay. Growth of the city was also fostered by the construction of the Mettur Dam in 1934. During this period, road and rail connectivity with Coimbatore was improved considerably facilitating easier transportation of goods. The period 1911-1921 also witnessed the construction of over 15,000 irrigation wells with government loans bringing large chunks of barren land under cultivation. Coimbatore was also home to some of the earliest film studios in South India. Rangaswamy Naidu established the Central Studios in 1935 while S. M. Sriramulu Naidu set up the Pakshiraja Studios in 1945.

In 1922, Narayanaswamy Naidu started a workshop to repair cane crushers and cotton ginning machines. Two years later, he established the Dhandayuthapani Foundry to manufacture Agricultural Pumps and Motors. Around the same time, G. D. Naidu started his unique bus service. He is also credited for manufacturing the first electric motor in India. Apart from that, he started a series of Engineering companies and Industrial training institute. In the 1940s, a Sheffield University graduate, D. Balasundaram Naidu (Textool Balasundaram) from Avarampalayam in Coimbatore, started his company Textool to manufacture textile machines of his design. Textool in 50s and 60s was one of the largest companies in South India that designed and manufactures indigenous machines and industrial products. In 1965, another textile family of VLB Naidu group set up Mopeds India Ltd after a technical collaboration with Motobécane of France to manufacture their legendary Motobécane Mobylette 50 cc moped under the name Suvega, but, only the central office was in Coimbatore while the plant was set up in Tirupathi.

The Kall Mills and the Somasundra mills were established in 1910. Lakshmi Mills Company commenced their operations in 1911 in Papanaickenpalayam. By the 1930s, several textile mills had been established around Coimbatore due to the cheap power offered by the Pykara power station.

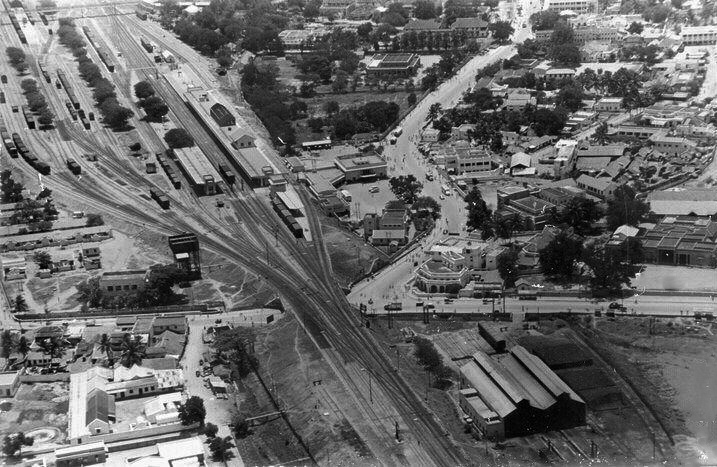
Railway station, Gopalapuram and Lanka Corner area in 1960s

== Post-Independence (1947 CE - present) ==
After the independence of India, Coimbatore transformed from a regional textile hub to a major urban, industrial, and educational powerhouse of the state of Tamil Nadu. However, in 1998, a major terrorist bombing occurred.

== See also ==
- Timeline of Coimbatore history
