= Tiruvadi Sambasiva Venkataraman =

Indian botanist and agronomist (1884–1963)

- Born: 15 June 1884; Salem, Madras Presidency, British Raj (now in Tamil Nadu, India)
- Died: 18 January 1963 (aged 78); Madras, Madras State (now Chennai, Tamil Nadu), India
- Education: Presidency College, Madras; University of Madras
- Known for: Hybridisation of sugarcane varieties
- Awards: 1920 Rao Sahib; 1928 Rao Bahadur; 1934 Fellow of the Indian Academy of Sciences (FASc); 1935 Foundation Fellow of the National Institute of Sciences of India (FNI) (Note: Prior to 1970, the Indian National Science Academy was named the "National Institute of Sciences of India", and its fellows bore the post-nominal "FNI". The post-nominal became "FNA" in 1970 when the association adopted its present name.); 1937 Companion of the Order of the Indian Empire (CIE); 1942 Knight Bachelor; 1956 Padma Bhushan
- Scientific career
- Fields: Botany; Agronomy; Plant genetics
- Workplaces: Sugarcane Breeding Institute

Rao Bahadur Sir Tiruvadi Sambasiva Iyer Venkataraman CIE, FNI, FASc (15 June 1884 – 18 January 1963) was an Indian botanist, agronomist and plant geneticist who specialised in the study and hybridisation of sugarcane. He developed or supervised the development of numerous high-yield sugarcane cultivars, which established India as the world's second largest sugar producer and sustained the sugar industries of numerous other nations, including South Africa, Australia, Bangladesh, Indonesia, Pakistan, and the United States.

== Early life and career ==
Venkataraman was born in Salem, Madras Presidency (now in the Indian state of Tamil Nadu) to an orthodox Tamil Brahmin family; though initially religious, he renounced religion by the age of 16. After graduating from a secondary school in Tiruchirapalli, where he was a brilliant scholar, he enrolled at Presidency College, Madras, where he decided to study botany over zoology, as he strongly disliked dissecting insects and other animals. In 1905, he graduated with a first-class honours B.A. in botany and briefly studied for an M.A. at Madras University before his appointment to the Agricultural College, Saidapet (now a constituent college of Tamil Nadu Agricultural University) as an assistant to Charles Alfred Barber, then a botanist in the Madras Presidency government service. In 1908, the college was moved to Coimbatore, where Venkataraman would spend the rest of his career. He soon demonstrated an aptitude for research, attempting to grow hybridised varieties of eggplant in his spare time.

== Research and development of the Coimbatore sugarcane cultivars ==
In the early 1900s, the extremely poor yields of Indian sugarcane varieties necessitated the import of sugar from the Netherlands East Indies, which was a heavy burden on the government exchequer. The British government eventually decided to establish a Sugarcane Breeding Institute to study sugarcane breeding and to develop an indigenous sugarcane industry. Coimbatore was selected due to its ideal climate, and Barber was appointed Government Sugarcane Expert in October 1912, with Venkataraman as his assistant. According to Venkataraman's biographer and sole graduate student, J. Thuljaram Rao, the two scientists' observation of wild sugarcane (Saccharum spontaneum) growing near the Agricultural College campus inspired them to use it in their trials.

Though the first hybrid sugarcane crosses between the wild sugarcane and a cultivated sugarcane species, Saccharum officinarum, did not survive, by 1914, Venkataraman had succeeded in producing viable hybrid seedlings. As sugarcane breeding was a new field of research, Venkataraman relied on meticulous planning and observation along with the pioneering of new techniques, including artificial induction of flowering through photoperiodic treatments, nobilization and outcrossing plants to improve their genetic diversity. He also pioneered the detailed study of sugarcane root systems, which became vital in understanding the plants' yield potentials. In 1918, the first hybrid sugarcane variety produced by the Institute, Co. ("Coimbatore") 205, was recorded as generating yields 50% greater than those of indigenous varieties, which were entirely replaced by Co. 205 within 6–8 years. Along with another variant, Co. 285, the new varieties were soon commercially marketed in the Punjab, where they also proved capable of being cultivated under stressed conditions, including in waterlogged fields. Following those successes, Venkataraman developed a tri-species hybrid by crossing S. spontaneum and S. officinarum with Saccharum barberi, a North Indian variety which Barber had researched. The resulting hybrid, Co. 244, became commercially cultivated in Uttar Pradesh. Subsequently, tetra-species hybrids were also produced after a fourth parent, Saccharum robustum, was incorporated into the breeding programme. The hybrid cultivars, with a sugar content nearly 35 times that of their parent stocks, were soon recognised for being fast-maturing, for their ease of propagation and their resistance to waterlogging, drought and the red rot (Glomerella tucumanensis) and sereh diseases.

In 1918, Venkataraman was promoted to full gazetted rank; he succeeded Barber as head of the Institute the following year, initially in an acting capacity while the British Indian government attempted to locate a European replacement to serve as director. After this proved unsuccessful, Venkataraman was eventually confirmed in his post and served as the permanent head of the Institute until his retirement. Over the next two decades, Venkataraman and his two research assistants, P. Thomas and N.L. Dutt, developed many more hybrid sugarcane varieties suitable for a wide range of environments and climatic conditions. While initial research had focused on developing hardy varieties that could sustain the colder winters in northern India, in 1926 research commenced into breeding plants for the South Indian and similar tropical climates. Apart from the successful Co. 205 and Co 285 cultivars, Co. 213, 421, 427 and 453 became popular in North India, notably in present-day Uttar Pradesh and Bihar, while Co. 419, developed by Dutt, achieved tremendous success across South India and supported the region's sugarcane industries for four decades after its commercial introduction.

In 1927, the Viceroy of India, Lord Irwin, visited the Sugarcane Breeding Institute and praised Venkataraman's work, subsequently ordering all those connected with sugarcane cultivation to pay a visit. In 1928, Venkataraman presided over the agricultural section of that year's Indian Science Congress, delivering a lecture on "The Indian Sugar Bowl." He visited Java the following year to attend the annual meeting of the International Society of Sugarcane Technologists, presiding over the varietal section. In 1932, he was appointed to the Indian Agricultural Service.

By the 1930s, Coimbatore sugarcane cultivars were in high demand and were being successfully grown around the world. In the United States, Co. 281 and Co. 290 supported the sugar industry in Louisiana; Co. 281 also sustained production in South Africa and Cuba as it was readily adaptable and high-yielding even in poor soils and less forgiving climates. Co. 290 achieved popularity in Australia, while the tropical-friendly Co. 419 and Co. 421 became mainstays of sugarcane growers in Barbados, Trinidad and British Guiana (now Guyana). In later years, N. Co. 310, first cultivated in South Africa from seed exported from the Sugarcane Breeding Institute, became the most popular commercially-grown sugarcane cultivar in the world. At one point in the 1960s, Coimbatore-developed varieties were supporting the sugarcane industries of 22 countries. In the 21st century, Coimbatore cultivars continue to be cultivated and used as breeding stocks in Australia, Bangladesh, Indonesia and Pakistan.

== Research into intergeneric sugarcane hybrids ==
In 1930, Venkataraman successfully developed intergeneric hybrids of sugarcane and sorghum with the objective of producing short-duration sugarcane hybrids. Though the project was ultimately a commercial failure due to issues with sterility, his work subsequently helped inspire Janaki Ammal to develop a sugarcane-maize hybrid. In 1936, he attempted to develop a further intergeneric hybrid of sugarcane and the indigenous Bambusa arundinacea bamboo, intended to combine the height of the latter with the sugar percentage of the former. Under controlled conditions, sterile male sugarcane cultivars were used as pistil parents, which were dusted with bamboo pollen. Though some seedlings were produced to much acclaim amongst plant geneticists, with Venkataraman presenting his findings at the 1939 International Genetics Congress in Edinburgh, studies later suggested the seedlings were the result of apomixis, which was less understood at the time. In his researches, however, Venkataraman anticipated the modern development of intergeneric hybrids on a far wider scale.

== Later career and life ==
Venkataraman was elected President of the 1937 Indian Science Congress, delivering his address on "The Indian Village" and discussing the improvement of villages in the country as a priority: "Our duty then is clear, namely, to improve the village, the nucleus of our country life and inject its chief agent, the villager, with a chosen culture of the virus of [the] modern age through education and industrialisation." He again presided over the agricultural section of the Indian Science Congress in 1938, delivering a lecture on sugarcane hybridisation, and attended the 1939 International Genetics Congress at Edinburgh, where he was recognised as a "wizard" of sugarcane.

Though he was scheduled to retire as head of the Sugarcane Breeding Institute in 1939, Venkataraman obtained a three-year extension and finally retired in 1942, when he was succeeded by his assistant Dutt. The year of his retirement, a Current Science article observed "the breeding work carried out by Venkataraman – aided by ample tariff protection – has been responsible for converting India from an importer of white sugar (1 million tons) to a position where the future of the Indian industry is in urgent need of securing export markets." By the end of his tenure at Coimbatore, it was estimated Venkataraman's efforts had saved India roughly 15 crore (150 million) rupees.

Following his retirement, Venkataraman agreed to conduct a survey of sugarcane research in India, but gave it up on health grounds. He subsequently retired to Madras, where he spent his time reading philosophical works and frequently writing letters to The Hindu on various subjects. When the International Society of Sugarcane Technologists decided to hold its 1956 conference in India, he chaired the section on cane breeding; during the conference, a plaque commemorating the development of the Co. 205 cultivar was unveiled at the Sugarcane Breeding Institute.

Venkataraman died in Madras on 18 January 1963, aged 78. He was married, and had one son, Ramamurti, who later became an assistant director of the National Physical Laboratory of India.

== Awards and honours ==
Venkataraman was extensively recognised for his achievements. In 1920, after the commercial success of the Co. 205 cultivar, he was given the title of Rao Sahib by the British government, and was raised to the title of Rao Bahadur in 1928. He was appointed a Companion of the Order of the Indian Empire (CIE) in the 1937 New Year Honours list. In the 1942 New Year Honours list, he received a knighthood, becoming the first Indian agricultural scientist to be thus honoured, and was formally invested with his knighthood at the Viceroy's House (now Rashtrapati Bhavan) in New Delhi on 21 February 1942 by the then Viceroy, the Marquess of Linlithgow. In 1956, he was conferred the Padma Bhushan by the Indian government.

Among his other distinctions, Venkataraman was conferred an honorary D.Sc. by Andhra University. In 1941, he was elected the first President of the Indian Society of Genetics and Plant Breeding, serving a single one-year term. He was elected as a Fellow of the Indian Academy of Sciences (FASc) in 1934, serving as its Vice-President in 1934–35, and was elected as a Foundation Fellow of the National Academy of Sciences of India (FNI, now the Indian National Science Academy) in 1935. He was also a member of the International Genetics Congress Association, the Indian Society of Genetics and Plant Breeding and the International Society of Sugarcane Technologists, and was an Honorary Fellow of the South African Sugar Technologists Association.
