= Coimbatore District (Madras Presidency) =

Administrative division of British India

Coordinates: 11°15′N 77°19′E

Coimbatore District கோயம்புத்தூர் மாவட்டம்
- District of the Madras Presidency
- 1805–1947
- Flag

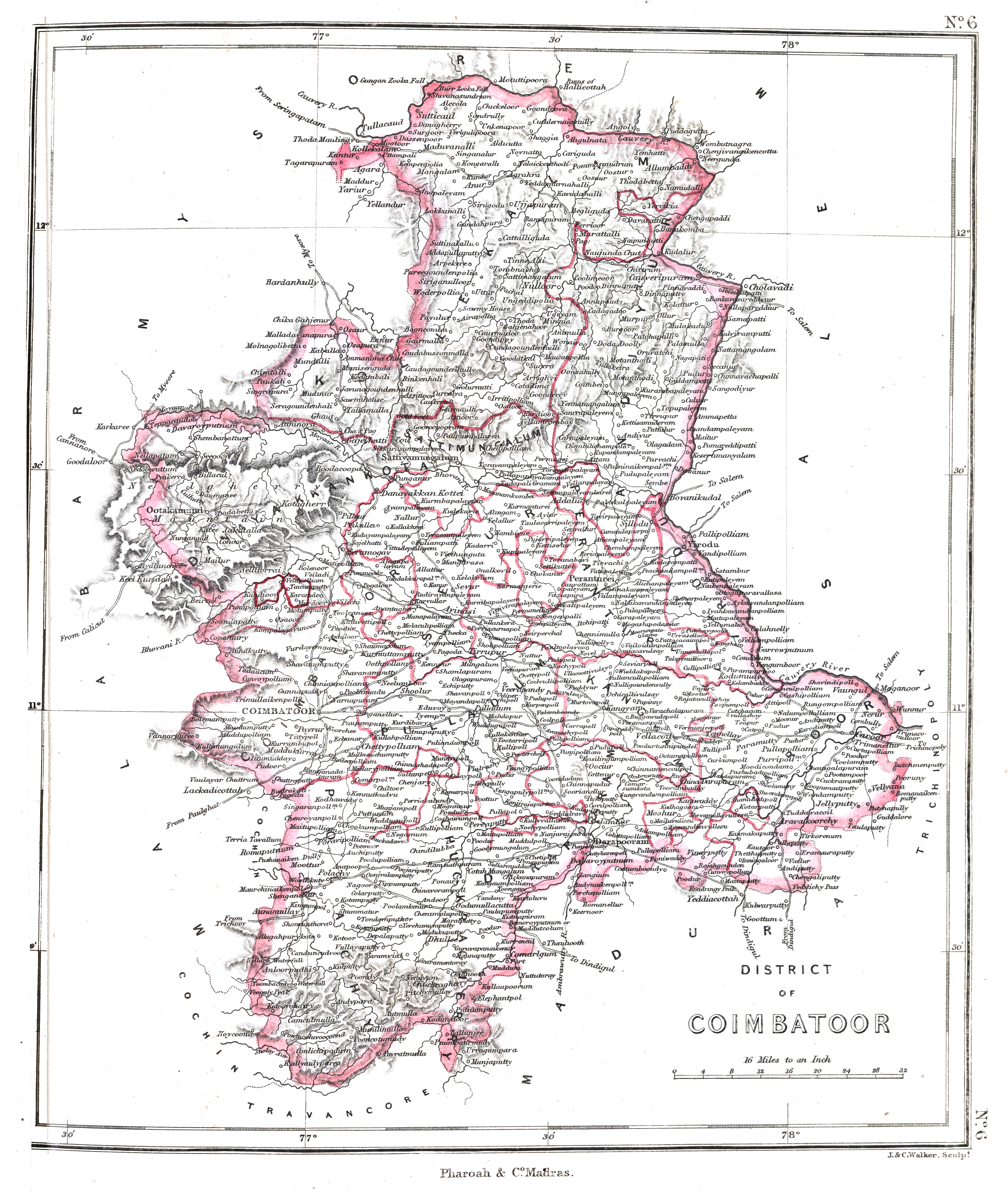
- Coimbatore district in 1854
- Capital: Coimbatore
- Area
  - 1901: 20,357 km^{2} (7,860 sq mi)
- Population
  - 1901: 2,201,752
- History
  - Establishment of the district: 1805
  - Modern Coimbatore district: 1947
Preceded by	Succeeded by
Kingdom of Mysore	Coimbatore district
- This article incorporates text from a publication now in the public domain: Chisholm, Hugh, ed. (1911). "Coimbatore". Encyclopædia Britannica. Vol. 6 (11th ed.). Cambridge University Press. pp. 652–653.

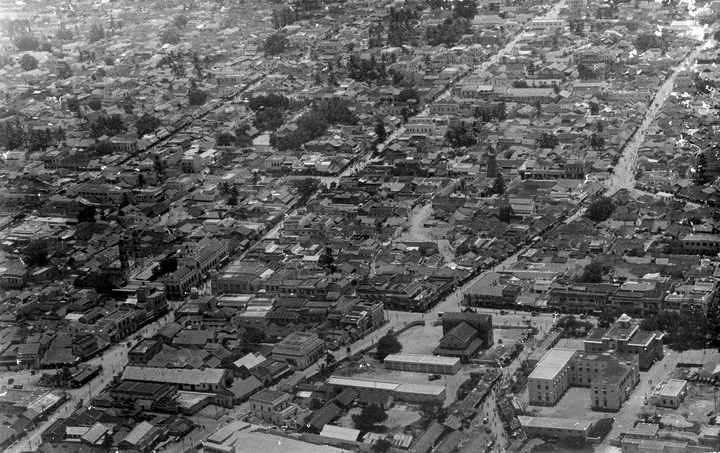
Aerial view of the Coimbatore Townhall zone in 1930

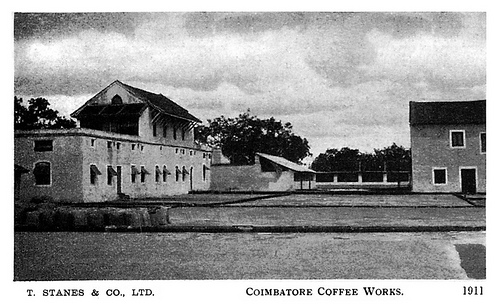
View of the Coimbatore Stanes Coffee Curing Works in 1911

Coimbatore District was one of the districts of the erstwhile Madras Presidency of British India. It covered the areas of the present-day districts of Coimbatore, Erode and Tirupur and the Kollegal taluk of present-day Karnataka. It covered a total area of 20,400 square kilometres (7,860 sq mi) and was sub-divided into 10 taluks. The administrative headquarters was Coimbatore city. Most of Coimbatore's inhabitants were Tamil-speaking but there were also large numbers of Malayalam, Telugu and Kannada speaking people.

== History ==
Coimbatore was a part of the ancient Chera kingdom during the Sangam Age. After the Chera kingdom fell, the region was ruled by the Western Gangas and the Hoysalas. Coimbatore came under Muslim rule in the 13th century AD and was a province of the Vijayanagar Empire. After the fall of the Vijayanagar Empire, Coimbatore was ruled by the Madurai Nayaks till 17th century. A series of wars between the Kingdoms of Kingdom of Mysore of Madurai Nayak dynasty resulted in the region coming under the control of Mysore kings till the defeat of Tipu Sultan in the Third Mysore War in 1792, Coimbatore became a part of British India.

The district was founded in 1805. In 1868, Nilgiri District was segregated. The Avinashi taluk was formed when Karur was separated from the district and merged with Trichinopoly District. In 1927 and 1929, other readjustments were made. In 1956, the Kollegal taluk was transferred to Mysore State. In 1975 and 1979, some sub-taluks were promoted to taluks, including Satyamangalam, Perundurai and Mettupalayam, so that Coimbatore district ended up with 12 taluks, but before the end of 1979, the six taluks of Bhavani, Gopichettipalaiyam, Satyamangalam, Erode, Perundurai and Dharapuram, were segregated to form Erode district. The remaining six taluks became nine after two new ones were established and a further one was bifurcated.

== Taluks ==
Coimbatore district was sub-divided into 10 taluks:

- Bhavani (Area: 1,850 square kilometres (715 sq mi); Headquarters: Bhavani)
- Coimbatore (Area: 2,100 square kilometres (812 sq mi); Headquarters: Coimbatore)
- Dharapuram (Area: 2,210 square kilometres (853 sq mi); Headquarters: Dharapuram)
- Erode (Area: 1,550 square kilometres (598 sq mi); Headquarters: Erode)
- Karur (Area: 1,590 square kilometres (612 sq mi); Headquarters: Karur)
- Kollegal (Area: 2,790 square kilometres (1,076 sq mi); Headquarters: Kollegal)
- Palladam (Area: 1,920 square kilometres (741 sq mi); Headquarters: Palladam)
- Pollachi (Area: 1,800 square kilometres (710 sq mi); Headquarters: Pollachi)
- Satyamangalam (Area: 3,050 square kilometres (1,177 sq mi); Headquarters: Gobichettipalayam)
- Udamalpet (Area: 1,470 square kilometres (566 sq mi); Headquarters: Udamalpet)

== Administration ==
Coimbatore district was divided into 4 sub-divisions:

- Coimbatore sub-division: Coimbatore and Sathyamangalam taluks
- Erode sub-division: Bhavani, Dharapuram, Erode and Karur taluks
- Kollegal sub-division: Kollegal taluk
- Pollachi sub-division: Pollachi, Palladam and Udumalpet

== See also ==
- History of Coimbatore
