= Charles Alfred Barber =

British botanist (1860–1933)

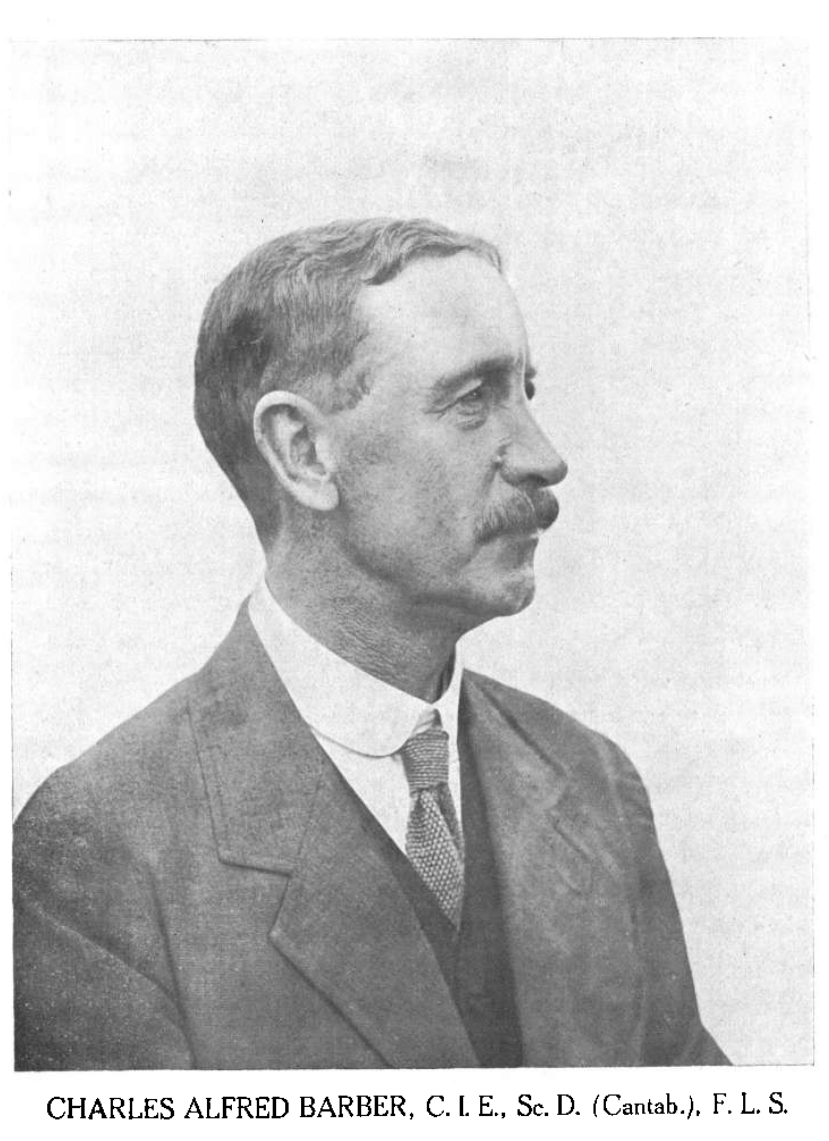
Portrait, c. 1920

Charles Alfred Barber C.I.E. (10 November 1860 – 23 February 1933) was a British botanist and specialist on sugarcane, who worked for much of his life in southern India. Saccharum barberi, a species of sugarcane that grows wild in northern India is named after him. He was a pioneer in the nobilization of wild canes in India, by producing hybrids between wild and hardy local species and the high-sugar-yielding cultivated Saccharum officinarum that could survive the cold winters of northern India. He was also involved in establishing the agricultural college at Coimbatore.

== Life and work ==
Born on 10 November 1860 at Wynberg, Cape Town, son of Rev. William Barber. He went to study at New Kingswood, Bath and later at Bonn University (1883–84). At Bonn university, he studied under Eduard Strasburger. He joined Cambridge University and passed the natural sciences Tripos with first class in 1887 (part I) and 188 (part II). He received an MA in 1892 and a Sc.D. in 1908. He joined in the Leeward Islands as a Superintendent of the Botanical Station in 1892 and worked for four years before joining as a lecturer in botany at the Royal Engineering College at Cooper's Hill. In 1898 he joined the Madras Presidency as Government Botanist. He studied root-parasitism in plants from 1906 to 1908. He was involved in setting up the agricultural college at Coimbatore which is now the Tamil Nadu Agricultural University. He became an expert on sugarcane to the Government in 1912. He became a lecturer on Tropical Agriculture at Cambridge University in 1919.

Barber worked on many aspects of sugarcane breeding and in basic botany. He established a sugarcane research station that is now known as the Sugarcane Breeding Institute at Coimbatore and along with T.S. Venkatraman developed hybrid sugarcane varieties suitable for India. These included hybrids between local and hardy canes from India which are now called Saccharum barberi after him and the tropical high-sugar yielding Saccharum officinarum which did not survive in the winter of northern India. This transfer of commercially useful traits from "noble" cane to Indian cane is referred to the nobilization of Indian canes. He was made C.I.E. in 1918. He was awarded the Maynard-Ganga Ram prize in 1931.

The standard author abbreviation C.A.Barber is used to indicate this person as the author when citing a botanical name.

Charles Alfred Barber died at Cambridge on 23 February 1933.
