= G. Kuppuswami Naidu =

Indian businessman (1884–1942)

G. Kuppuswamy Naidu (1884–1942) was an entrepreneur and businessman from Coimbatore, India. In 1910, he established Lakshmi Mills, a major textile yarn and cloth manufacturer in Coimbatore. Lakshmi Mills owns multiple textile units, machine tools company and other educational institutions and hospitals in Coimbatore. Sundaram Karivardhan, Indian auto racer was the grandson of Kuppuswami.
