= Kottaimedu Mosque =

Mosque in Kottaimedu, Tamil Nadu, India

- கோட்டைமேடு பள்ளிவாசல், கோயம்புத்தூர்
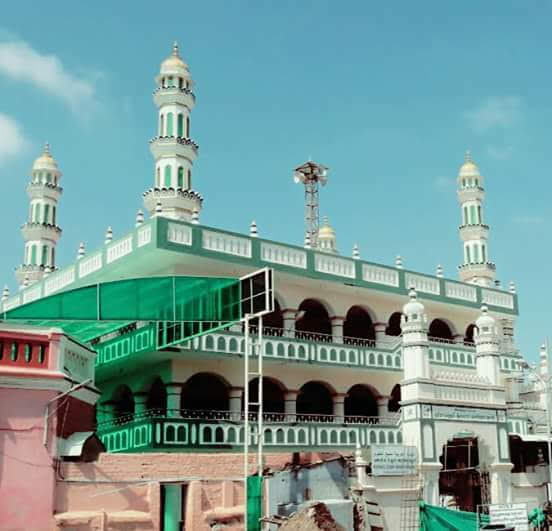
- The mosque in 2020

- Location of the mosque in Tamil Nadu

Religion
- Affiliation: Islam
- Ecclesiastical or organisational status: Mosque
- Leadership: T. A. Mohammed Dharvesh (Gen. sec.)
- Status: Active

Location
- Location: Kottaimedu, Coimbatore, Tamil Nadu
- Country: India
- Coordinates: 10°59′24″N 76°57′53″E

Architecture
- Type: Mosque architecture
- Style: Indo-Islamic; Dravidian
- Founder: Tipu Sultan (1776)
- Funded by: Haji Mohammed Pillai Rawther (1910)
- Established: 1776
- Groundbreaking: 1901 (reconstruction)
- Completed: 1776 (original mosquen); 1910 (reconstruction)
- Minaret: Four

The Kottaimedu Mosque, also known as the Kottai Hidayathul Islam Safia Jamath Mosque (Tamil: கோட்டைமேடு பள்ளிவாசல், கோயம்புத்தூர்), is a mosque in Kottaimedu within the Coimbatore district of the state of Tamil Nadu in India. The mosque is situated approximately one kilometre (one thousand one hundred yards) from the Coimbatore Junction railway station. Built in 1776 and reconstructed in 1910, one of the features of the mosque is its underground water tank for wudu.

== History ==
Legend has it that Muslim saint, Syed Abdul Qadir, arrived in Kottaimedu, drawn by the region's vibrant cultural mix, and established a small prayer hall.

The original mosque was built in 1776 under Tipu Sultan as part of a fort. After its destruction during the British rule, Haji Mohammed Pillai Rawther arranged for a new mosque to be built between 1901 and 1910. He was buried next to the mosque, and a nearby street was named in his honour. Rawther's son-in-law, Haji Meera Pillai Rowther, succeeded him in maintaining the mosque.

A number of casualties from the 1921 Malabar Rebellion against the British were buried here. Lena Mohammad Rawuthar became first president of the mosque in 1924 and was responsible for constructing facilities for Islamic education.

The mosque was registered under 'Act XXI of 1860' on 2 May 1924 and a management was formed by 21 members of the administration. The document was signed by 195 members of the congregation.

== Architecture ==
The mosque was designed in a combination of Indo-Islamic and Dravidian architectural styles, with beautiful paintings and designs. The main hall was built with a large central pillar supported by ornate pillars. The main attraction of this mosque is its interior, which is decorated with calligraphy and geometric patterns reflecting Islamic culture, and its underground wudu facilities.

== Gallery ==
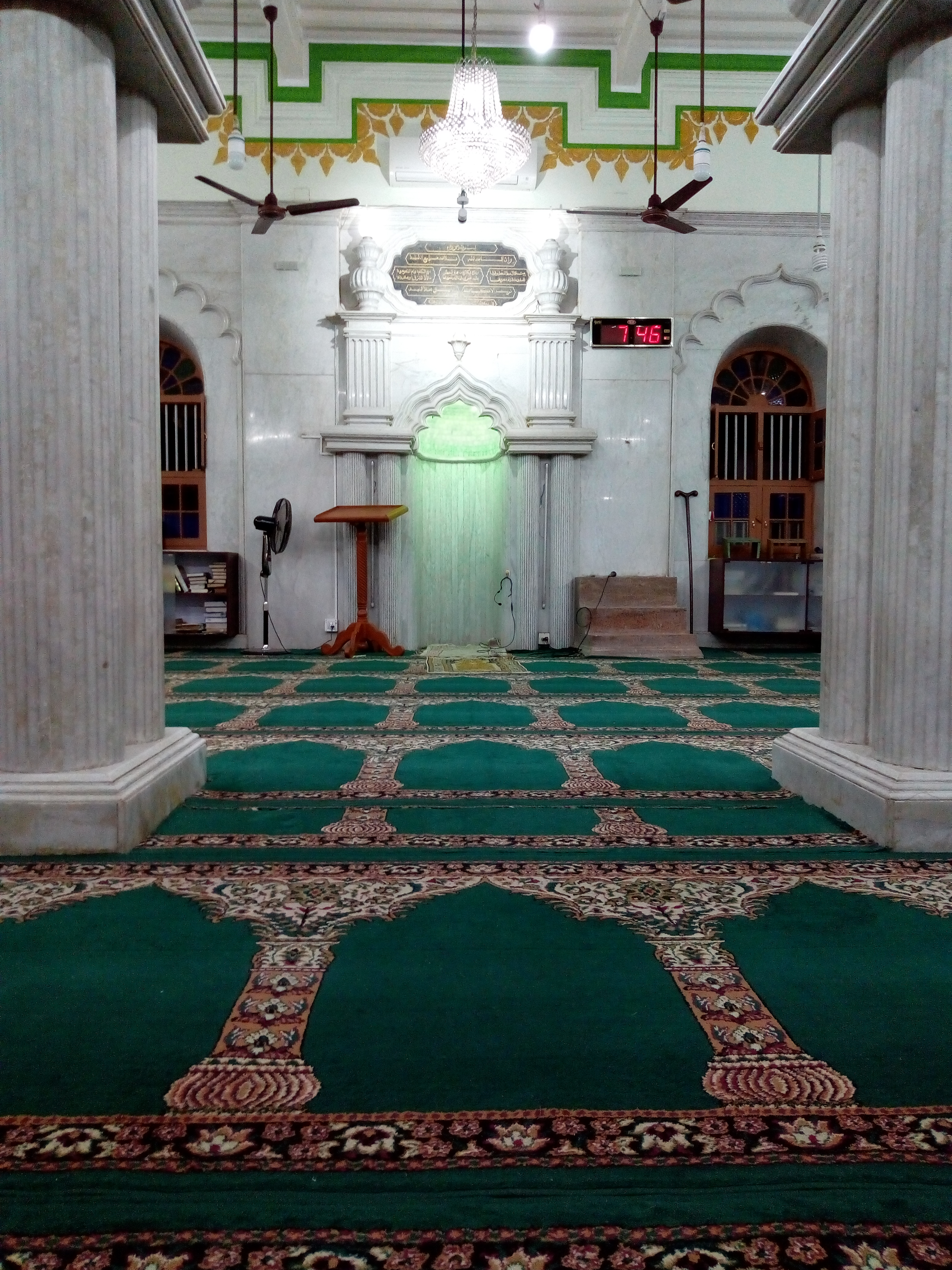
The mosque interior

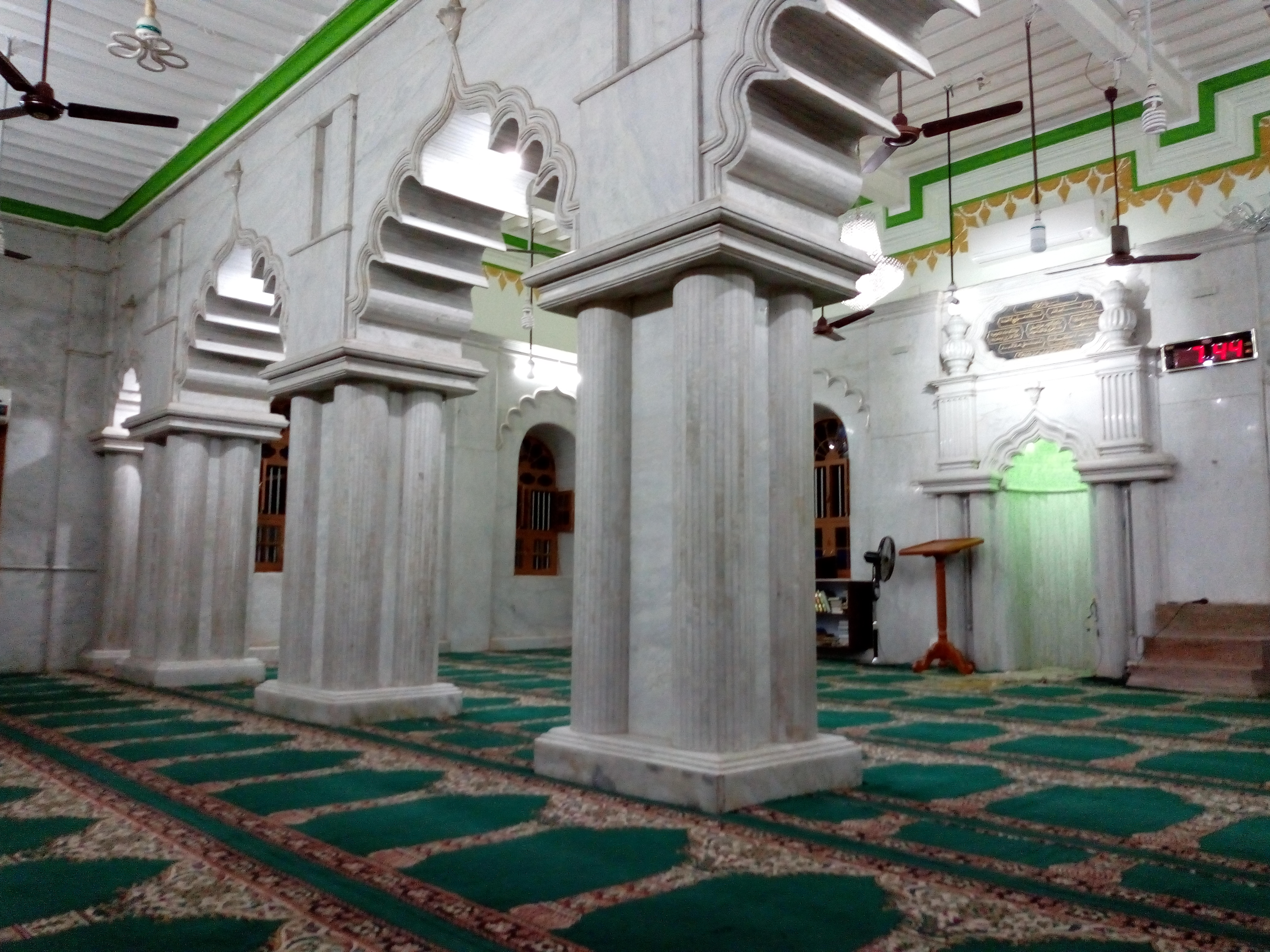
The mosque interior

== See also ==
- Islam in India
- List of mosques in India
