= S. P. Narasimhalu Naidu =

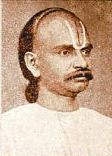
- Born: Salem Pagadala Narasimhalu Naidu; 12 April 1854; Erode, Madras Presidency
- Died: 22 January 1922 (aged 67)
- Spouse(s): Ethiraj Ammal, Meenakshi Ammal
- Parent(s): Rangaswami Naidu, Lakshmi Ammal

Salem Pagadala Narasimhalu Naidu (or Pagadala Narasimhalu Nayadu) (12 April 1854 – 22 January 1922) was an Indian politician, social worker, and publisher. He became the Secretary of the Coimbatore unit of the Indian National Congress (INC) when it was formed in 1885. He was the first person to have written travelogues in Tamil. He gave Coimbatore some of its earliest industries and was instrumental in establishing public institutions.

== Brief history ==
He was named Balakrishna at birth and was later renamed as Narasimhalu after his grandfather. He was married to Ethiraj Ammal of Salem in 1868, who later died of tuberculosis after the death of their two sons. Subsequently, Narasimhalu Naidu married Meenakshi Ammal from Palakkad in 1899.

He wrote his first travelogue Arya Divya Desa Yatari Sarithiram in 1889 describing his experiences beyond the Vindhyas. He began publishing the Salem Patriot in 1877 to write on social issues. After the Salem Patriot closed down, he began publishing the Coimbatore Abamaani and then Coimbatore Patrika in 1879. In 1881, he established another publication, Coimbatore Crescent. The Kalanidhi Press was also established by him.

Narasimhalu Naidu established Coimbatore city's first textile mill, CS&W Mills. He also established a sugar mill in Podhanur. He was involved in the establishment of the Victoria Municipal Hall (now the Town Hall), Coimbatore Cosmopolitan Club, Coimbatore College Committee and Coimbatore Co-operative store. The Siruvani water supply system in Coimbatore is the outcome of his study and efforts.

He was a visionary and helped awaken social and literary consciousness. He established bodies to spread the teachings of the Brahmo Samaj in Salem and Coimbatore. He wrote more than a hundred books and booklets on religion, history, music, agriculture, law and medicine. Narasimhalu Naidu traced his past to the Vijayanagara kings and is the author of Balijavaru Puranam (or Balija Vamsa Purana) published in 1896.

Narasimhalu Naidu was the Secretary of the Coimbatore unit of the Chennai Mahajana Sabha, a social reform movement. He became the Secretary of the Coimbatore unit of the Indian National Congress (INC) when it was formed in 1885. He was one among the 21 representatives from Tamil Nadu who attended the first conclave of the INC in Bombay in 1885. He attended its next convention in Calcutta in 1886 and the third in Chennai in 1887.
