= Coimbatore Vizha =

Annual festival in Coimbatore, India

- Coimbatore Vizha Vanga Kondadalam
- Status: active
- Genre: City festival
- Begins: 2 January 2027
- Ends: 12 January 2027
- Frequency: Annually
- Location: Coimbatore
- Country: India
- Years active: 17
- Inaugurated: 2 January 2009
- Founder: Shankar Vanavarayar
- Previous event: Coimbatore Vizha 18th Edition (14 - 24 Nov 2025)
- Next event: Coimbatore Vizha 19th Edition (2 - 12 Jan 2027)
- Leader: Rahul Kamath (Chair), Vaishnavi Janani (Co-Chair)
- Member: Nishanth Sivasamy, Anirudhan Grandhee, Subhiksha Ramesh, Sundar Ram
- Website: www.coimbatorevizha.com

Coimbatore Vizha is an annual festival of Coimbatore, India. The nine day event seeks to bring together all citizens to celebrate the perennial spirit of Coimbatore.

One of the key attractions is an open double decker bus that dons festival signage and offers free city tours. The bus ride covers popular locations and some heritage buildings in the city.

== History ==
Coimbatore Vizha was initiated in 2009 by Shankar Vanavarayar. The event has grown in terms of supporting institutions, events and citizen participation. For the first edition, children from 30 schools accompanied by religious leaders visit various places of worship, promoting communal harmony and better understanding.

In 2016 the 8th edition took place from 29 January to 4 February. In 2017 the 9th edition began on 27 January, with 50 partner organisations and 90 events. Kovai Paatu, an audio visual tribute for Coimbatore and Chippy the Mascot of the Coimbatore Vizha were announced. A robofest and a helmet awareness rally were among the unique events for this edition. In 2018 the 10th edition was held from 5-12 January, presenting 120 events. Open double decker bus rides of the city were a unique addition. Seven main streets of Coimbatore were designated as "vizha streets" (festival streets). Unique events included an "Ovia Sandhai" (Drawing bazaar) featuring around 100 artists and a mass city cleaning programme.

The eleventh (2019) edition was held between 4-12 January. It featured 103 partners and 150 events. Key events include the Coimbatore Vizha parade, Eat street, Open quiz, heritage car show, movie festival, heritage walks, science and technology showcase, art and sporting events.

== Mascot ==
Chippy the mascot represents the state bird of Tamil Nadu, the Common Emerald Dove. Chippy the mascot is also called the "Emerald princess".
