= Perur Pateeswarar Temple, Coimbatore =

Hindu temple in Tamil Nadu, India

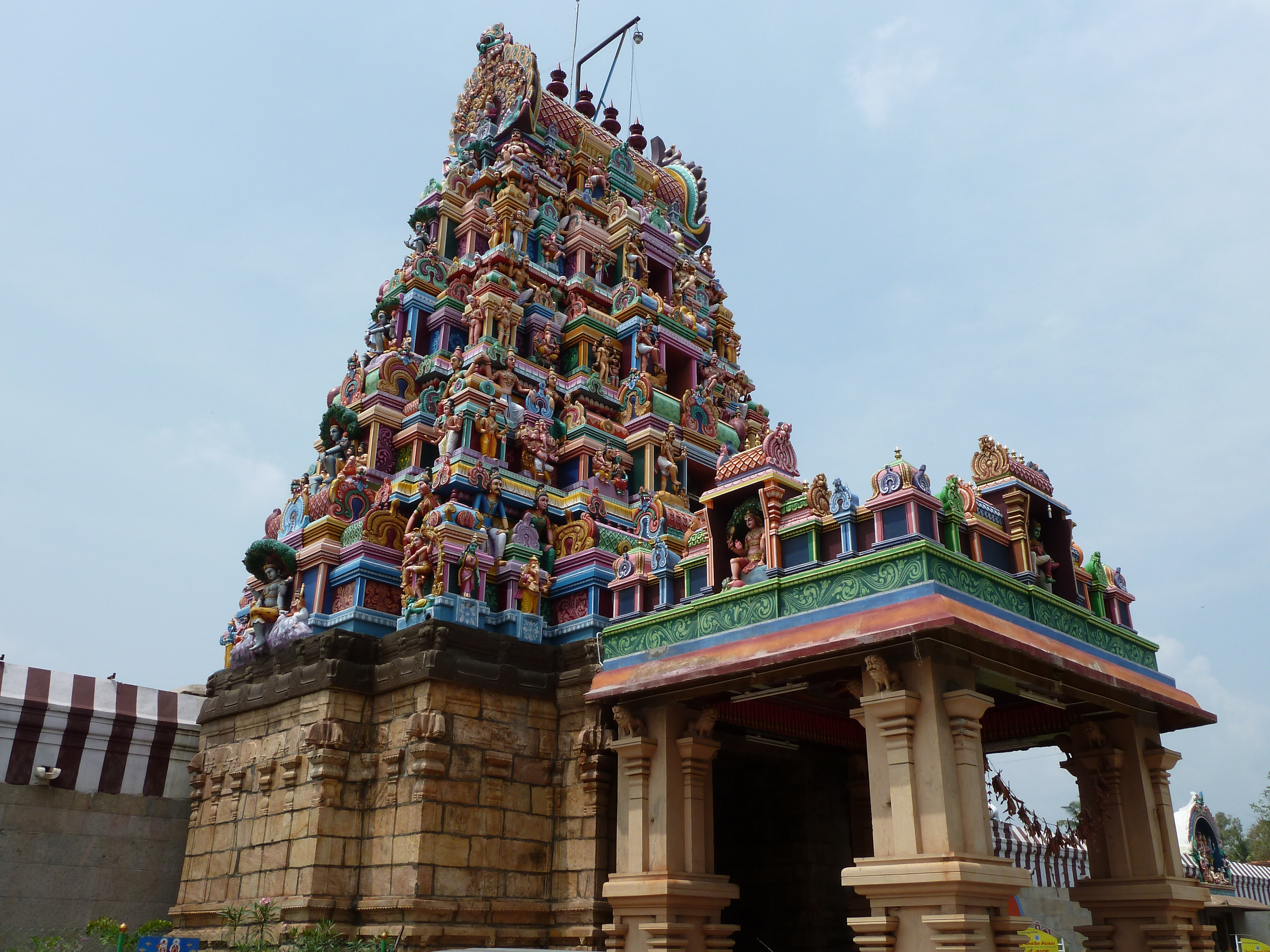
- Gopuram at the entrance of the temple

- Location in Tamil Nadu

Religion
- Affiliation: Hinduism
- District: Coimbatore
- Deity: Sri Pateeswarara Swamy (Shiva) Sri Pachainayagi Amman (Parvati)

Location
- Location: Perur, Coimbatore.
- State: Tamil Nadu
- Country: India
- Coordinates: 10°58′33″N 76°54′53″E

Architecture
- Type: Tamizh Chozha architecture
- Creator: Karikala Chola
- Completed: 2nd century CE

Website
- http://www.perurpatteeswarar.tnhrce.in/

Perur Pateeswarar Temple is a Hindu temple dedicated to Lord Shiva located at Perur, in western part of Coimbatore in state of Tamil Nadu in India. The temple was built by Karikala Chola in 2nd century CE. The temple is located on the bank of the Noyyal River and has been patronized by poets like Arunagirinathar and Kachiappa Munivar. Patteeswarar (Shiva) is the presiding deity of this temple together with his consort Pachainayaki (Parvati). The main deity is a Swayambu Lingam.

Various names for the temple have been used over the years, including, Kamadenupuri, Pattipuri, Adhipuri, Daksha Kailasham, Thavasiddhapuram, Gnanapuram, Kalyanapuram, Pirava Neri Thalam, Pasupathipuram, and Melai Chidambaram.

== History ==
The temple was built by the Chola emperor Karikala in the 2nd century CE. Further contributions were made by Imperial Cholas in late 10th & early 11th centuries.

== Architecture ==
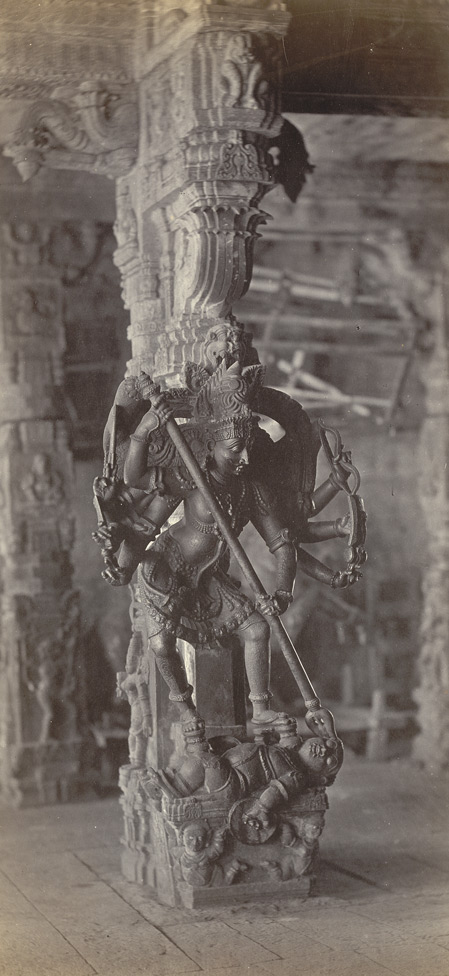
Shiva in the act of destroying one of the sons of Kasimuni

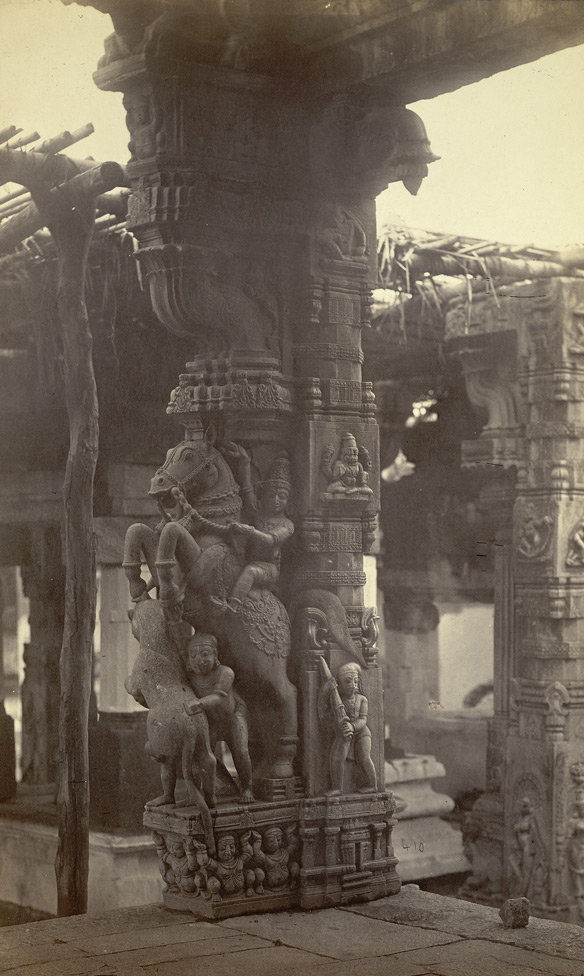
A view of the two Pillars immediately on the top of the steps leading to the temple

Perur Pateeswarar Temple has several gopurams and halls, notably the Kanaka Sabha, which contains a golden statue of Nataraja. The ceiling is covered in a network of stone chains, and the pillars are decorated with carvings of Shiva in his different forms.

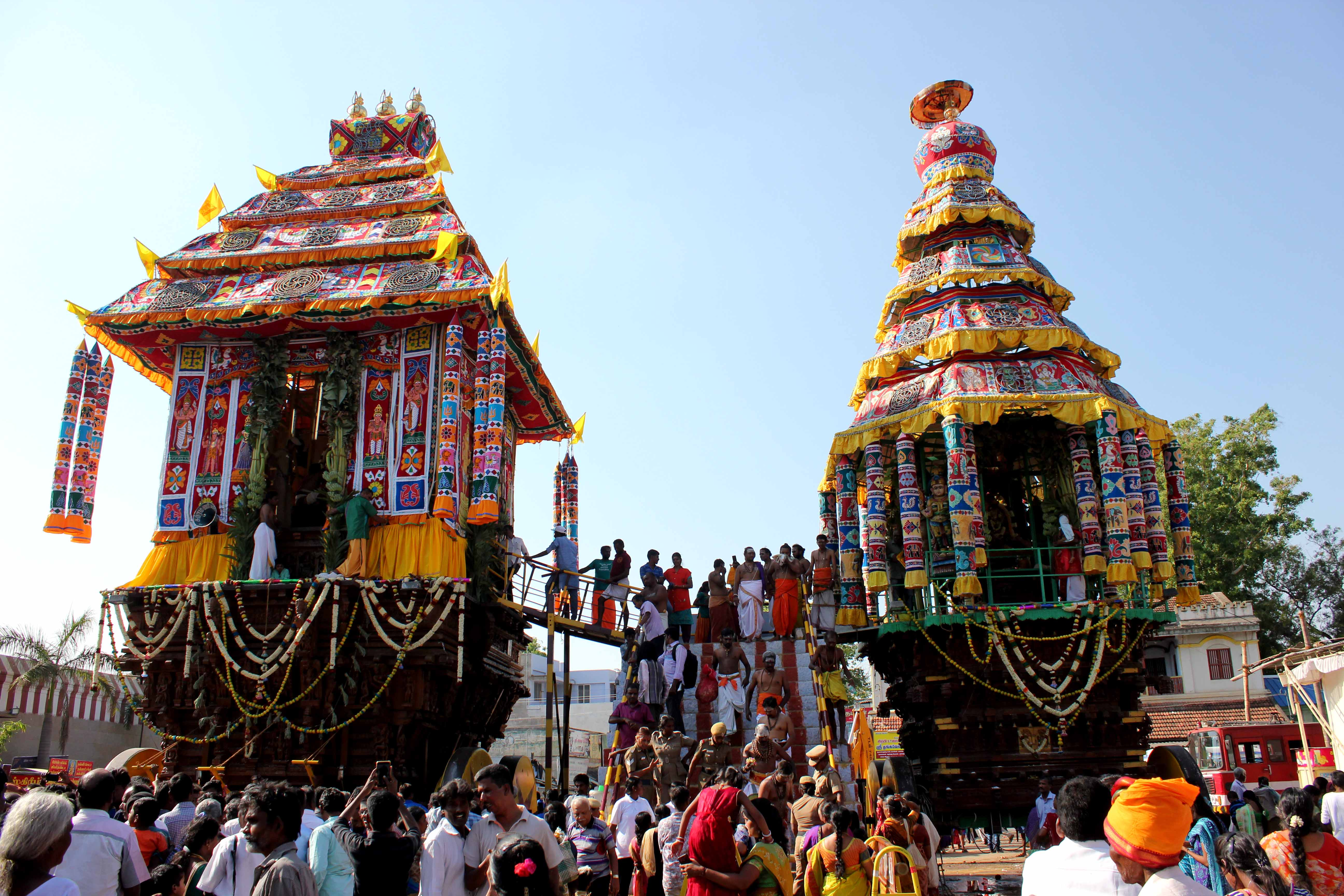
Temple car on 18 March 2019

== Culture ==
Every year, the temple celebrates a classical dance week, typically Bharata Natyam. The temple is believed to be one of the places where Shiva performed Ananda Thandavam.

== Festivals ==
=== Temple chariot festival ===
Every year in the month of Panguni, Panguni Uthiram is celebrated. A temple chariot is paraded through the neighborhood as part of the celebration.

=== Seedling planting festival ===
The festival has been celebrated by the farming community along the banks of Noyyal River. The festival is conducted in the month of Aani. The ritual forms a part of Indra festival. The festival has its reference from the "Perur Puranam" by Kachiappa Munivar.
