= Lakshmi Mills =

Indian textile-producing company

The Lakshmi Mills Company Limited
- Type: Public
- Traded as: BSE: 502958
- Industry: Textile
- Founded: 1910
- Founder: G. Kuppuswami Naidu
- Headquarters: Avinashi Road, Papanaickenpalayam, Coimbatore, TN, IN
- Key people: S. Pathy (Chairman); R. Santharam (Vice Chairman)
- Products: Textile Yarn, Textile Garments, Weaving and Spinning
- Revenue: INR 2.21 Billion (Balance Sheet info)
- Parent: Lakshmi Machine Works

Lakshmi Mills Company is a major textile yarn and cloth manufacturer in Coimbatore, India. The company was established by G.Kuppuswamy Naidu in 1910.

It has two composite textile units in Coimbatore: Avinashi Road and Palladam and one in Kovilpatti. The promoters of the mill were also instrumental in starting various textile machinery companies notably LMW and medical and educational institutions. The unit in Coimbatore in Papanaickenpalayam is also a well known famous landmark of the city.

== History ==
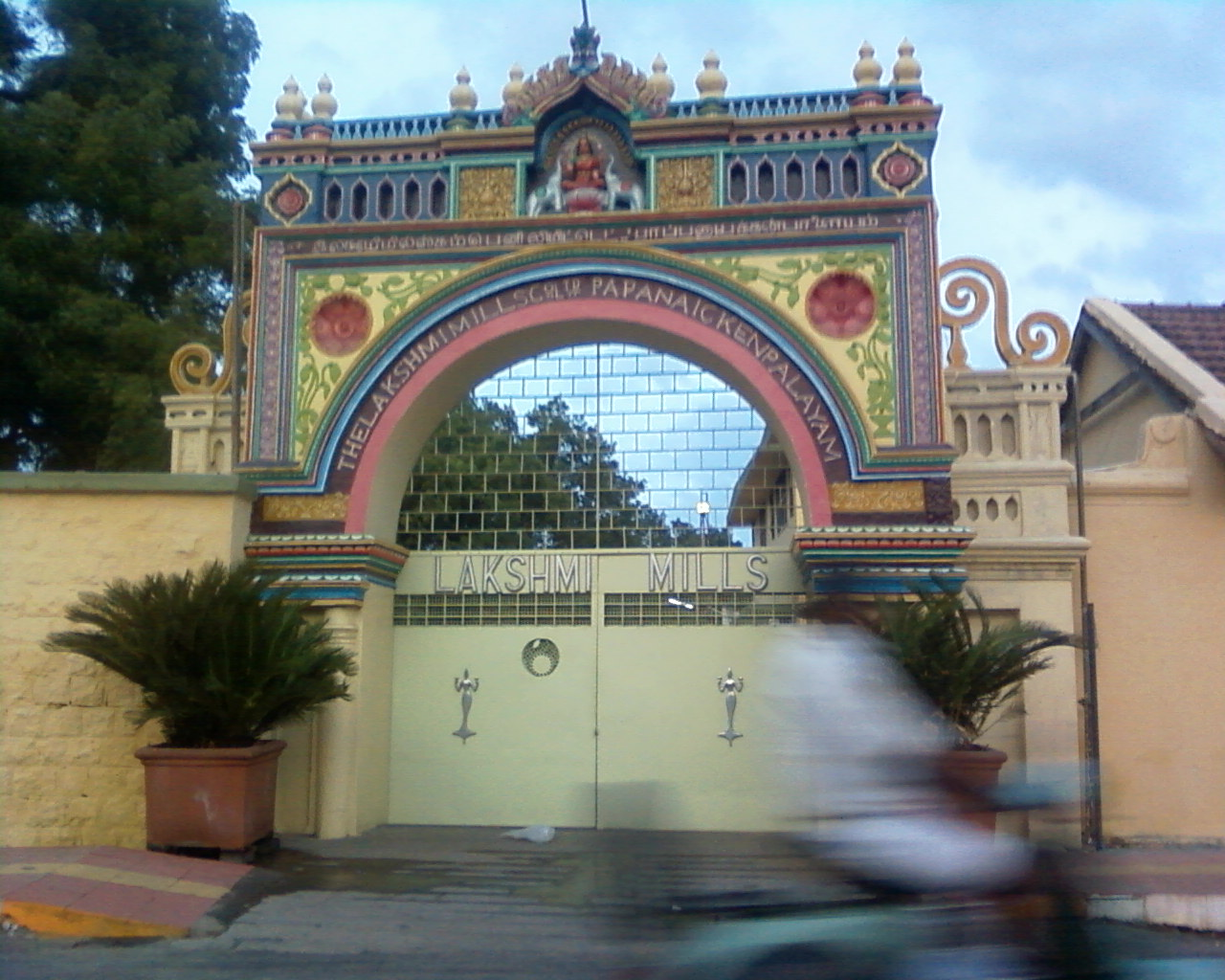
Lakshmi Mills main gate facing Avinashi Road in Coimbatore

The founder G. Kuppuswami Naidu born in Papanaickenpalayam, Coimbatore was into cotton ginning and trading. Lakshmi Mills was incorporated in 1910 as a composite textile mill to produce cotton yarn and fabric cloth under ‘Lakshmi Mills’ label in Avinashi Road. In mid-1940s second unit was started at Kovilpatti, Tamil Nadu and in mid-1960s Palladam unit commenced operations. In 1977, Coimbatore Cotton Mills, established in the 1930s as a composite textile unit Singanallur was merged into Lakshmi Mills. This unit was under Lakshmi Mills management since the 1950s. By 1960s staple fibre production was added to the product line. The company had showrooms in prominent cities and town in South India to sell suiting, shirts, sarees and other textile products

== Group expansion ==
Lakshmi Mills was also instrumental in the group's expansion into textile machinery companies like LMW, Lakshmi Automatic Looms, Lakshmi Card Clothing, Lakshmi Ring Travellers. The management along with R.Venkataswamy family set up the viscose staple yarn production unit South India Viscose with technology license from SNIA Viscosa of Milan, Italy .

Lakshmi Mills manufactures 100% combed cotton yarns in NE 50s to NE 120s, polyester cotton blended yarns in NE 40s to NE 100s. In addition, the Company manufactures 100% lenzing micro modal/modal/tencel yarns, micro modal/modal cotton blended yarns, 100% micro tencel yarn, tencel/cotton blended yarn.

== Notable directors ==
Notable directors and founding family members include S.Karivardhan, a then Indian motorsport personality and founder's managing director, G. K. Devarajulu, then Managing Director and founder of LMW, G. K. Sundaram, a freedom fighter.

The company was also instrumental in promoting various sports, notably cricket, hockey, motorsports, and horse racing.
