= Sugarcane Breeding Institute =

Research Institute

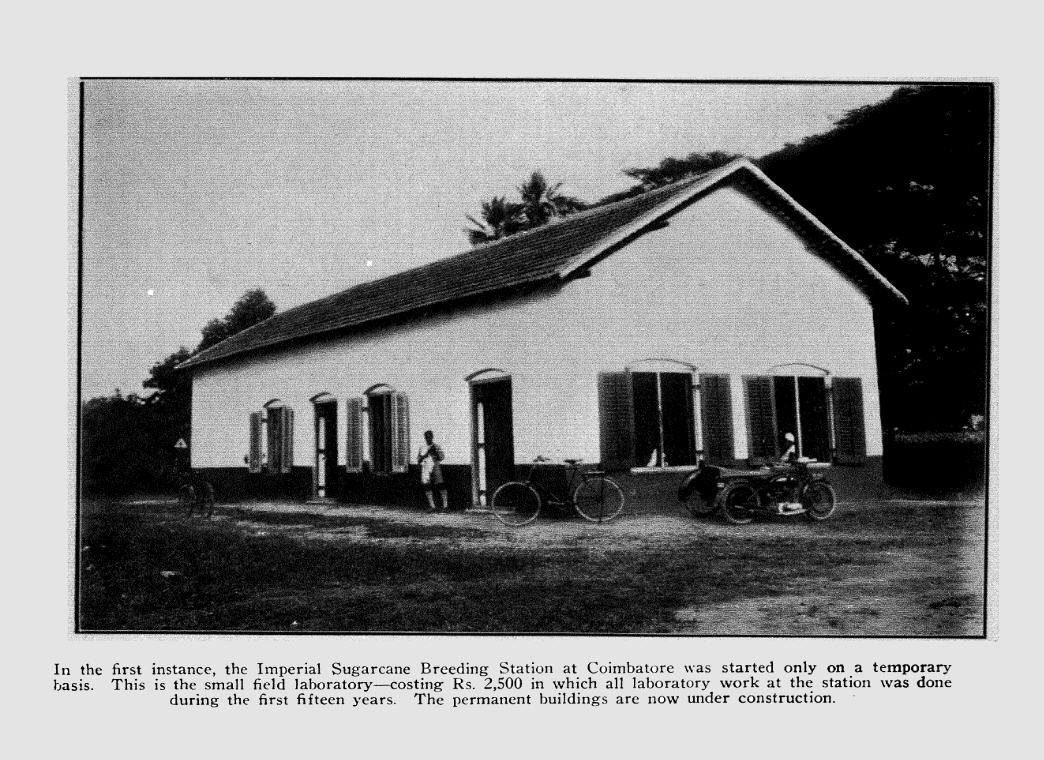
- Established: 1912
- Owner: Indian Council of Agricultural Research
- Location: Coimbatore, Tamil Nadu, India
- Website: sugarcane.res.in

Sugarcane Breeding Institute (SBI) is a central research institute in Coimbatore, India. It was established in 1912 and is affiliated to Indian Council of Agricultural Research. It was established to promote research efforts in sugarcane production and is the only sugarcane research institute in the country.

== History ==
The Sugarcane Breeding Institute was established by the British Raj in 1912. The institute was established as a sugarcane research station under the Department of Agriculture, Madras Presidency funded by the then British Government. In 1932, a new center at Karnal was established with the funds sanctioned by the Imperial Council of Agricultural Research. In 1962, a new research center was established in Kannur to house the world collection of sugarcane germplasm. The institute got affiliated to Indian Council of Agricultural Research in 1969. In 1999, a new research center at Agali, Palakkad became operational.

== Centres ==
1. Regional Centre Karnal, Haryana
2. Research Centre Kannur, Kerala
3. Research Centre Agali, Kerala

== Work ==
The sugarcane varieties introduced by the institute occupy more than 90% of total sugarcane cultivated area in India. The institute was involved in early research into hybridization, a first attempt to improve the subtropical types of sugarcanes. The first variety Co 205 was developed in 1918 based on wild sugarcane species Saccharum spontaneum and Saccharum officinarum resulted in 50 percent improvement in cane yield. The sugarcane varieties introduced were exported to Cuba and the United States.

In 2012, the institute developed transgenic sugarcane introducing new molecular technologies. In 2014, the institute introduced high energy sugar canes with high sucrose content which can be used for both commercial sugar extraction and biomass energy production. In 2015, a new sett treatment device was developed in collaboration with the Central Institute of Agricultural Engineering for treating the setts under reduced pressure to prevent them from fungal diseases. The institute introduced seven new varieties of sugarcane in 2015. CODISSIA organizes Agri Intex, an annual agricultural trade fair to promote agriculture and allied industries in association with SBRI. The 15th edition was organized in 2015 which included participants from over 10 countries.
