= G. D. Gopal =

Indian businessman and inventor (born 1939)

- Born: August 1939 (age 87)
- Occupations: Businessman; Inventor
- Known for: Chairman of UMS Technologies
- Spouse: Chandra Gopal
- Parent: G. D. Naidu (father)

G. D. Gopal (born August 1939) is an Indian businessman and inventor.

== Early life and career ==
G. D. Gopal was born in August 1939 and was brought up in Coimbatore. He attended Stanes School and learned English from a local Communist leader. His father was G. D. Naidu, and his influence meant that he met several prominent people during his childhood. He accompanied C. S. Ratnasabhapathy Mudaliar, R. K. Shanmukham Chetty, and his father, Naidu, on a land survey to bring Siruvani water to Coimbatore.

Gopal is credited with creating the first pocket calculator in India in 1971. He is the chairman of UMS Technologies, and is one of the founders of Gedee Weiler, the first CNC lathe manufacturer in India, and GPlast. He is the managing trustee of G D Naidu Charities, an organisation which runs the Gedee Technical Training Institute, the Gedee Car Museum and the Experimenta Science Centre. He helped establish the Mahatma Gandhi Memorial in Coimbatore.

== Awards and honors ==
Gopal has been awarded the Order of Merit of the Federal Republic of Germany. He received Arutchelvar Dr. N. Mahalingam Award in 2018, and was awarded the Kulapati Munshi Award by Bharatiya Vidya Bhavan in 2023. He was inducted into the Fédération Internationale des Véhicules Anciens Hall of Fame in 2025.
