= Mahatma Gandhi Memorial (Coimbatore) =

- Interactive map of Mahatma Gandhi Memorial
- Location: Coimbatore, Tamil Nadu, India
- Coordinates: 10°57′8.143″N 76°59′41.515″E
- Opening date: 2 October 2022
- Dedicated to: Mahatma Gandhi

Mahatma Gandhi Memorial in Podanur consists of the home that Gandhi stayed during his two day visit to Coimbatore.

== History ==
On 6 February 1934, Mahatma Gandhi was visiting Coimbatore for his organisation, Harijan Sevak Sangh and stayed at the GD House till 7 February 1934. The house has no electricity, roof tiles and a thinnai (transl. front courtyard), where Gandhi slept on a cot. During his visit, he laid the foundation stone for the Ramakrishna Mission Vidyalaya group of colleges.

Before the preservation, it originally consisted solely of a marble status of Gandhi and was overgrown with weeds. The restoration of the house was initiated after BK Krishnaraj Vanavarayar, the chairman of the Kumaraguru Institutions group, visited the house and an elderly man told him that Gandhi had stayed there and that the house belonged to G. D. Naidu's family. Krishnaraj contacted G. D. Gopal and the restoration began in 2021. The memorial consists of a photo gallery, library, conference space, and has a display of Gandhi's artefacts including his glasses. It was opened to the public on 2 October 2022 coinciding with Gandhi's 153rd birth anniversary. Krishnammal Jagannathan was present at the inaguration. The memorial is "the only existing structure in Tamil Nadu in which Gandhi stayed during his visit".
