= R. S. Puram, Coimbatore =

Neighbourhood in Coimbatore, Tamil Nadu, India

R. S. Puram
- Neighbourhood
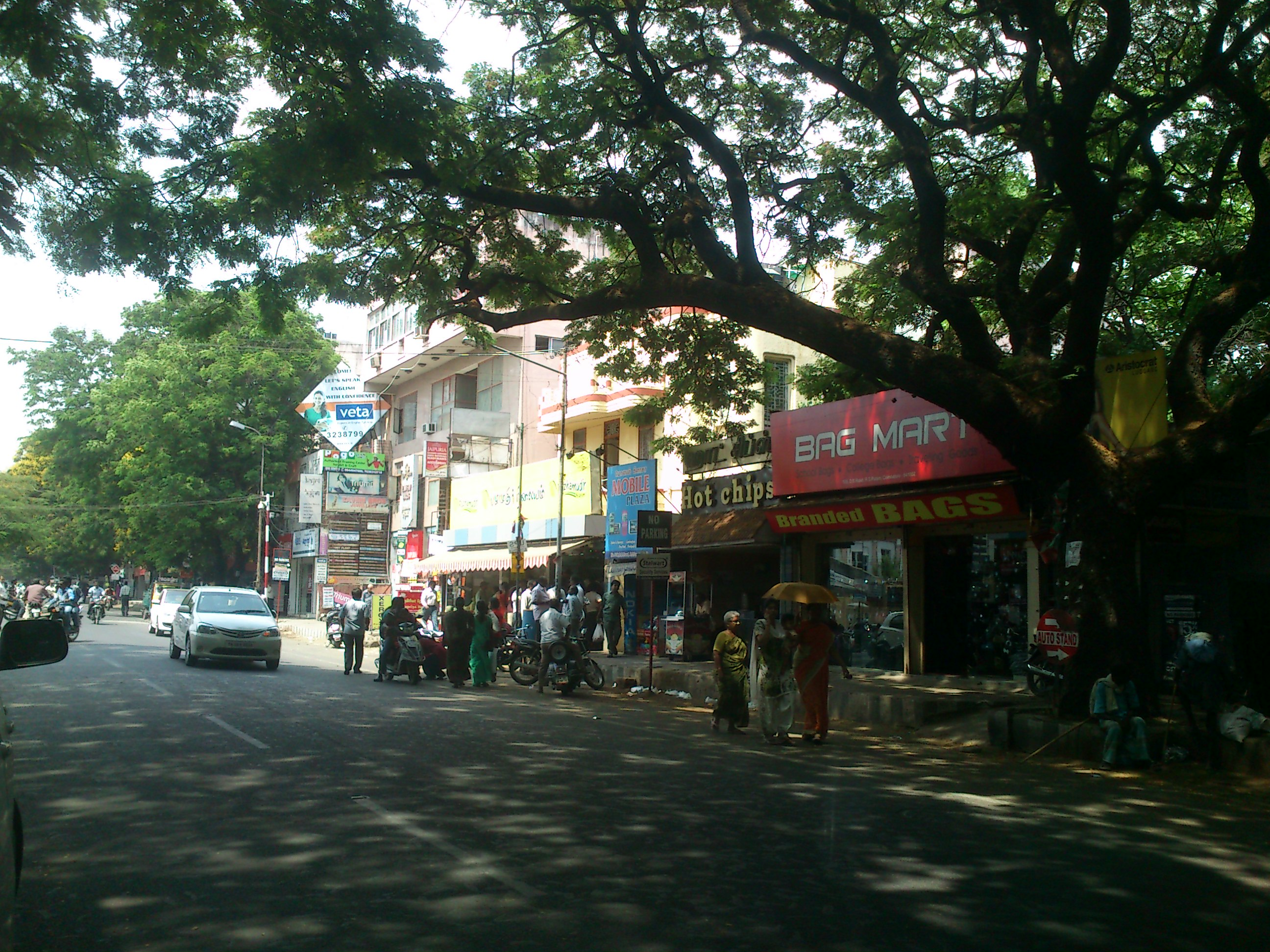
- Diwan Bahadur Road

- Location in Tamil Nadu, India
- Coordinates: 11.2°N 77.0°E
- Country: India
- State: Tamil Nadu
- District: Coimbatore
- Elevation: 411 m (1,348 ft)

Languages
  - Official: Tamil
- Time zone: UTC+5:30 (IST)
- PIN: 641002
- Telephone code: 91-422
- Vehicle registration: TN-66

R. S. Puram (or Rathina Sabapathi Puram) is a residential area in the city of Coimbatore, Tamil Nadu, India. It is named after the late Dewan Bahadur C. S. Ratnasabhapathy Mudaliar, who is regarded as the founder of modern Coimbatore. The area of R. S. Puram includes multiple commercial and residential buildings.

== Geography ==
R. S. Puram is situated in the western part of the city near the Old Coimbatore area of Ukkadam and Poomarket between Mettupalayam Road and Thadagam Road. R. S. Puram shares a border with: Sai Baba colony, Sukrawarpettai, Gandhi Park, Mettupalayam Road, Tamil Nadu Agri University Campus (TNAU), Forest Campus and Thadagam Road.

== Population ==
R. S. Puram has an approximate population of 62,600. Most local new-generation companies, including those in IT and mobile, operate their head offices in the neighbourhood, meaning RS Puram has a significant floating population.

== Climate ==
R. S. Puram is located in Tamil Nadu, which has a mainly tropical savanna climate. The highest temperature recorded there is 41 °C and the lowest is 12 °C.

== Economy ==
Many rich commercial properties of the city are situated at R.S. Puram. As of now, R. S. Puram is the third largest commercial hub of Coimbatore City after Town Hall and Gandhipuram, Coimbatore. R.S. Puram has a large number of multinational chains and is one of the major shopping centres in Coimbatore.

== Infrastructure ==
=== Design ===
R. S. Puram is a planned neighbourhood, with Diwan Bahadur Road being the largest road in the area. All roads run east-west, cross DB Road and exit to Mettupalayam Road on the east and Thadagam Road on the west.

== Localities ==
The localities of R. S. Puram include:

- Diwan Bahadur Road (DB Road) - main road
- TV Swamy Road (Thiruvenkata Swamy Road)- main road
- Cowley Brown Road (Lawley Road) - main road
- Ponnurangam Road (West and East)
- Venkatasamy Road (West and East)
- Sir Shanmugam Road
- Sirinivasa Ragavan Street
- Periaswamy Road (West and East)
- Bashyakarlu Road (West and East)
- Lokamanya Street (West and East)
- Sambandam Road (West and East)
- VenkataRamana Road
- Arokiyasamy Road
- Azad Road
- Ramalingam Road
- Arunachalam Street
- Robertson Road
- Siva Subramaniam Road
- Father Randy Street (North, South, East, and West)

In January, 2018, RS Puram Police Station was named the best police station in India by the Home Ministry, Government of India.

== Gallery ==
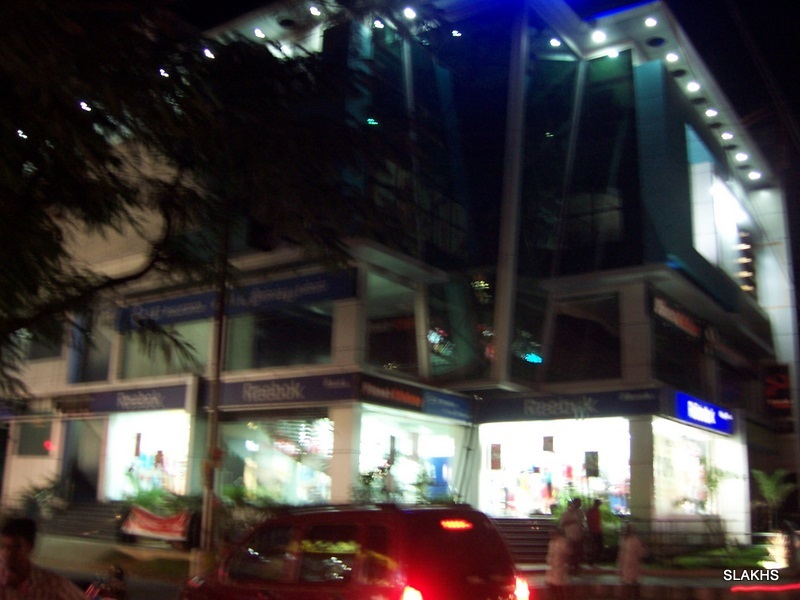
Midtown towers on D.B Road

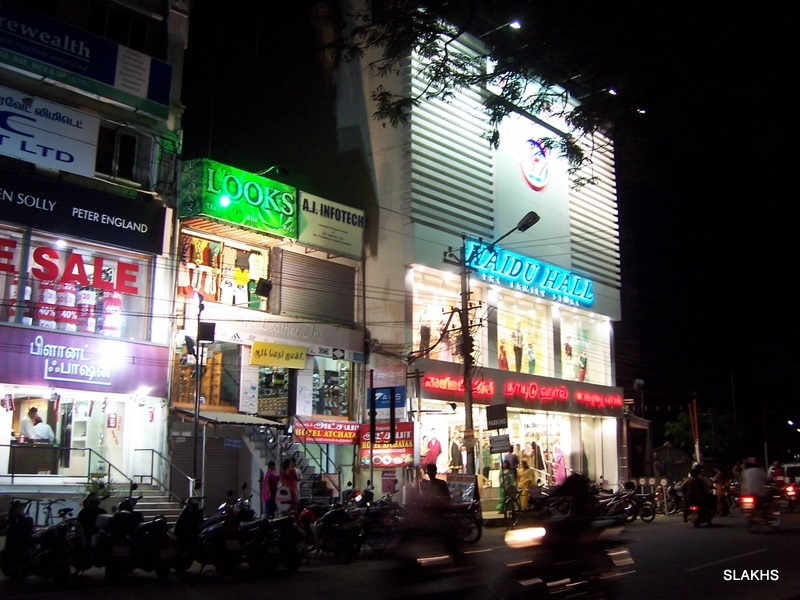
Shops on D.B Road

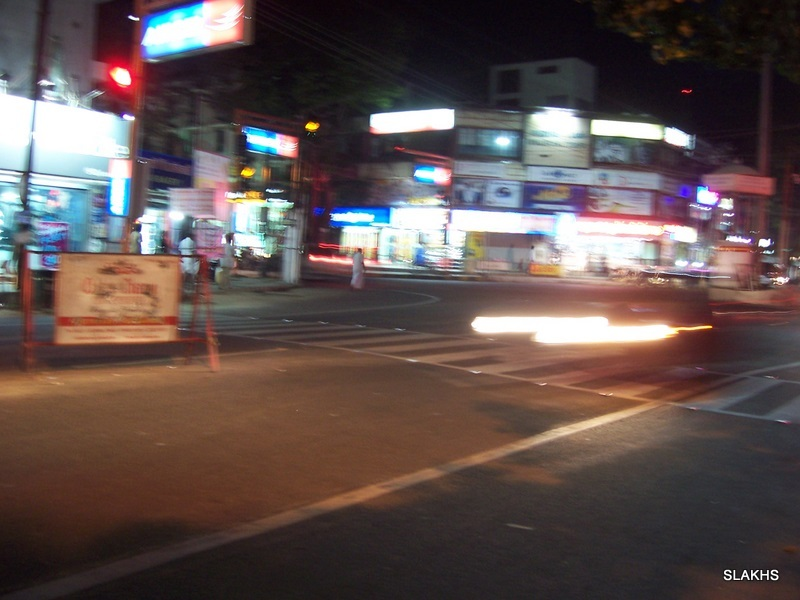
D.B Road signal

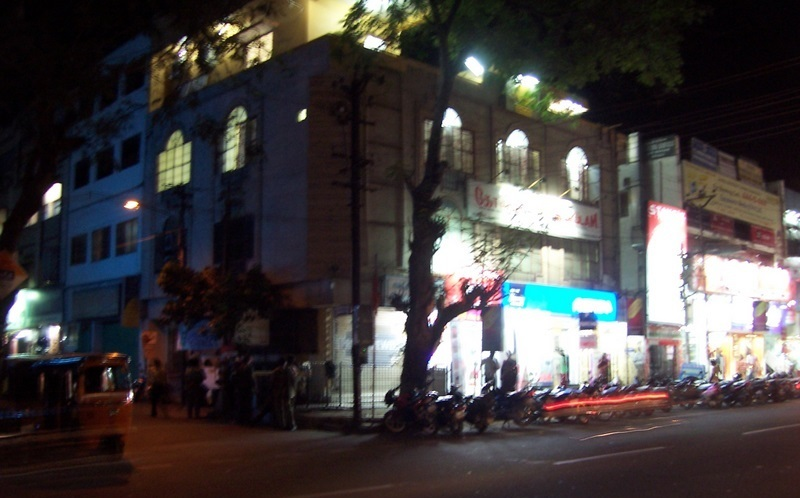
Shops on D.B Road

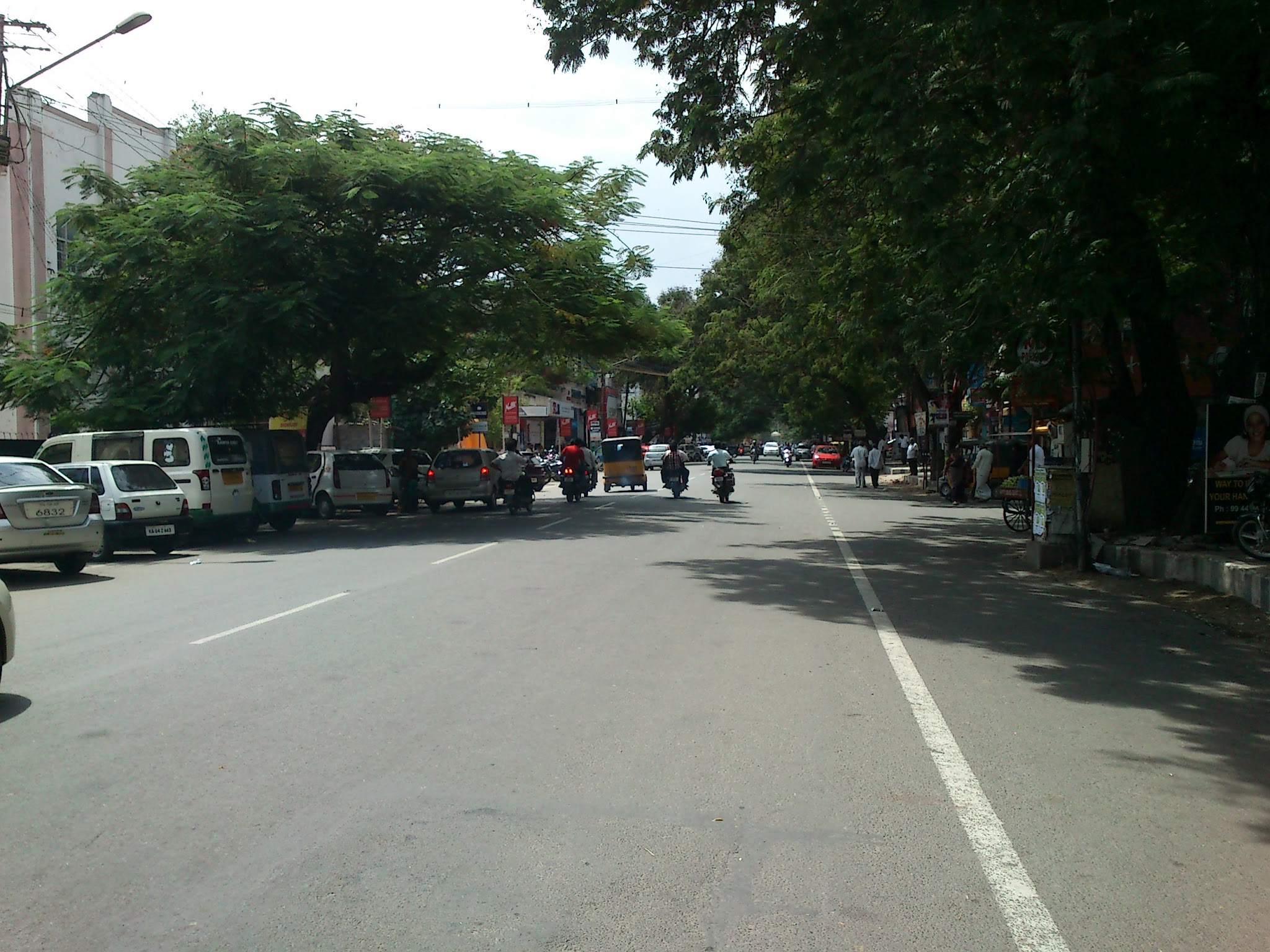
Diwan Bahadur Road

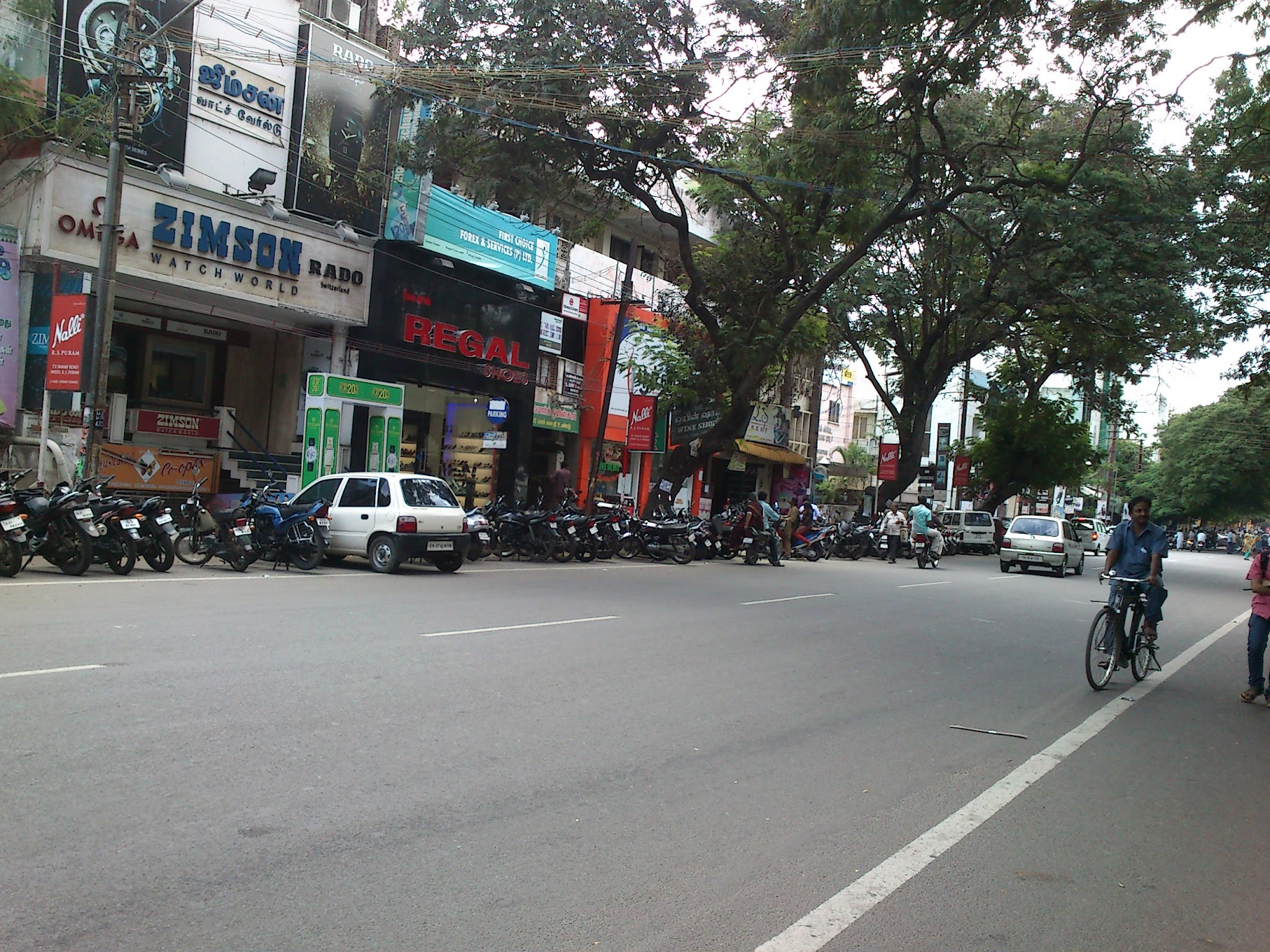
Diwan Bahadur Road

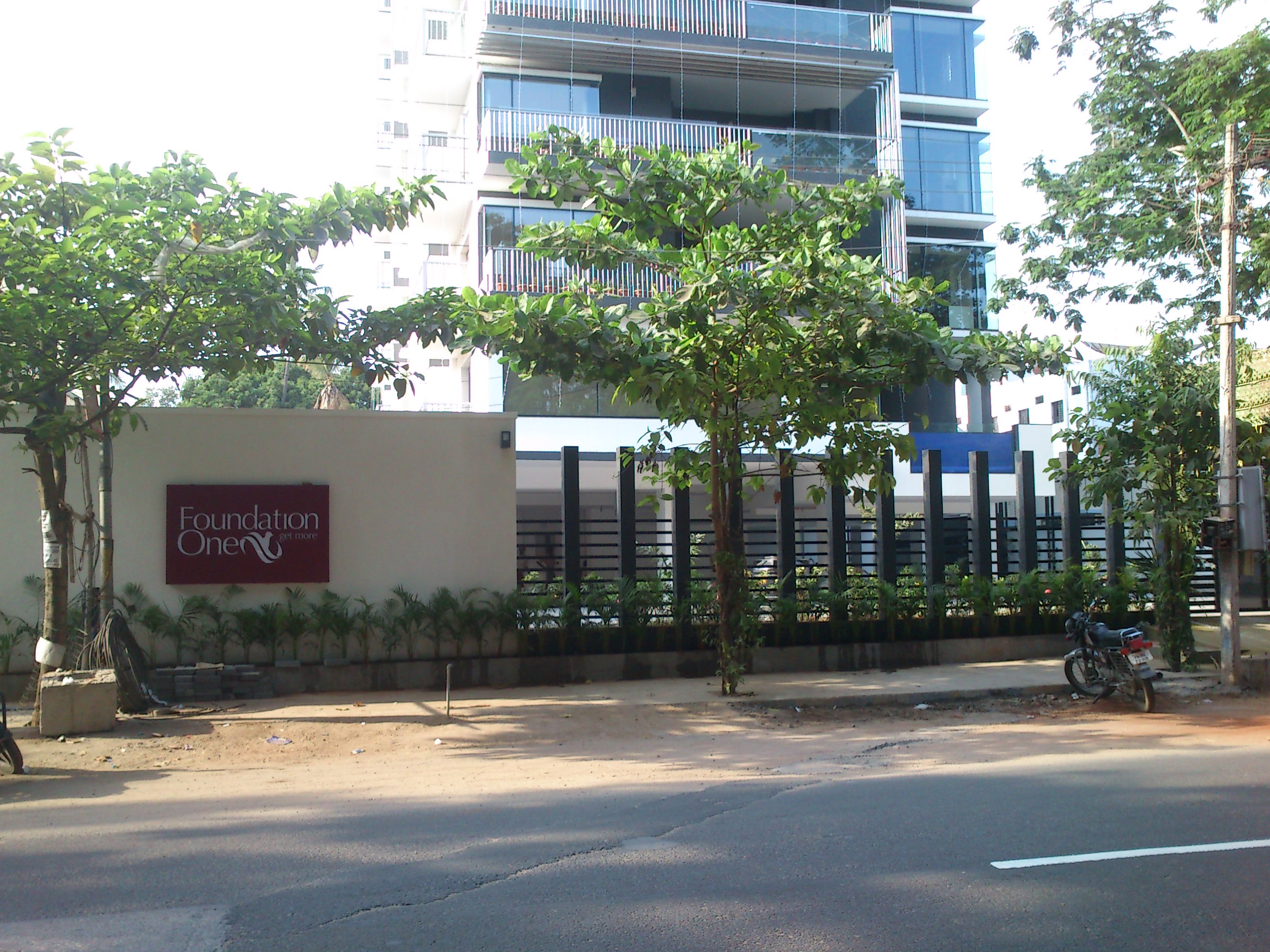
Foundation one apartment on TV Swamy Road

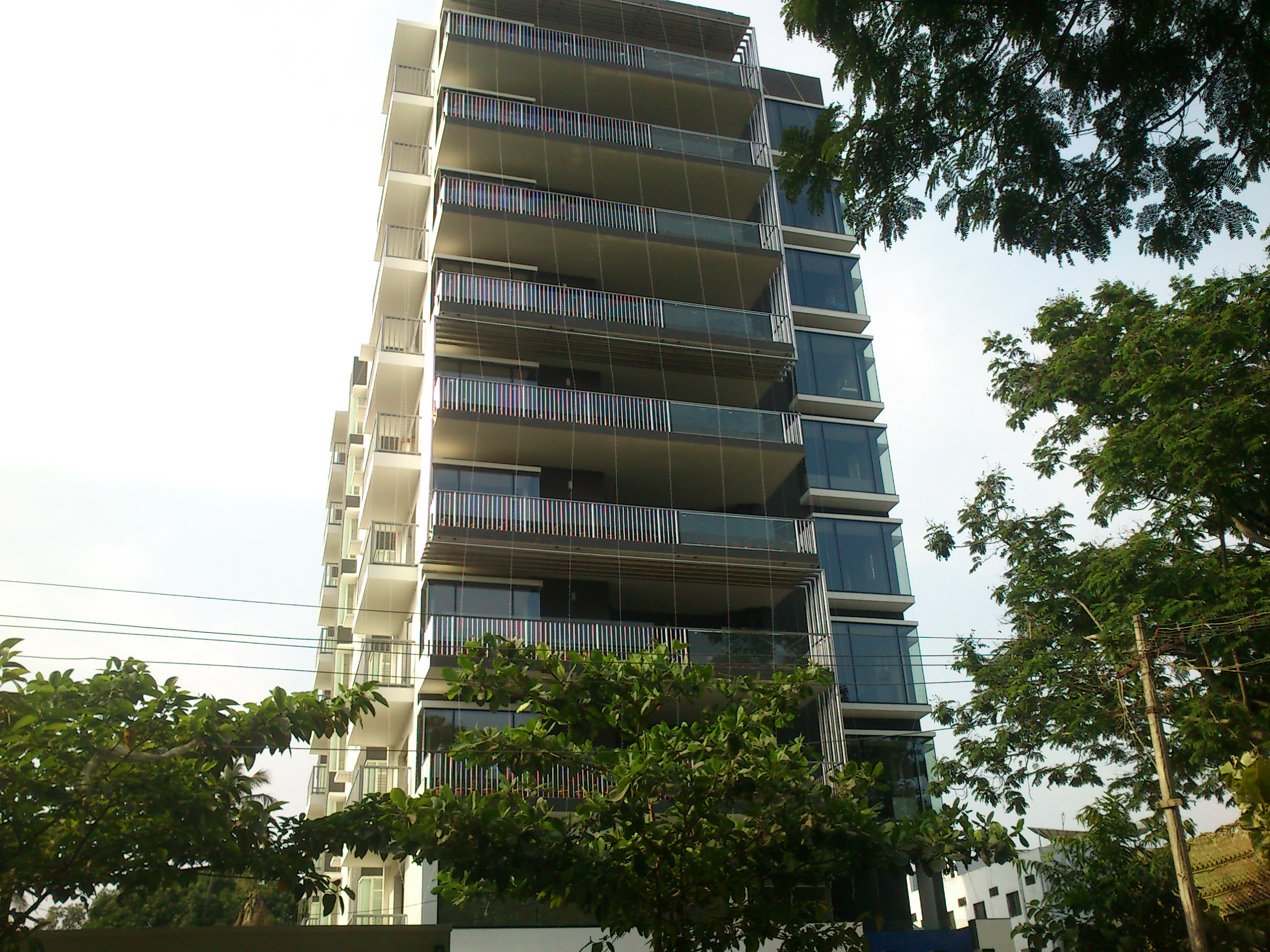
Foundation one apartment on TV Swamy Road

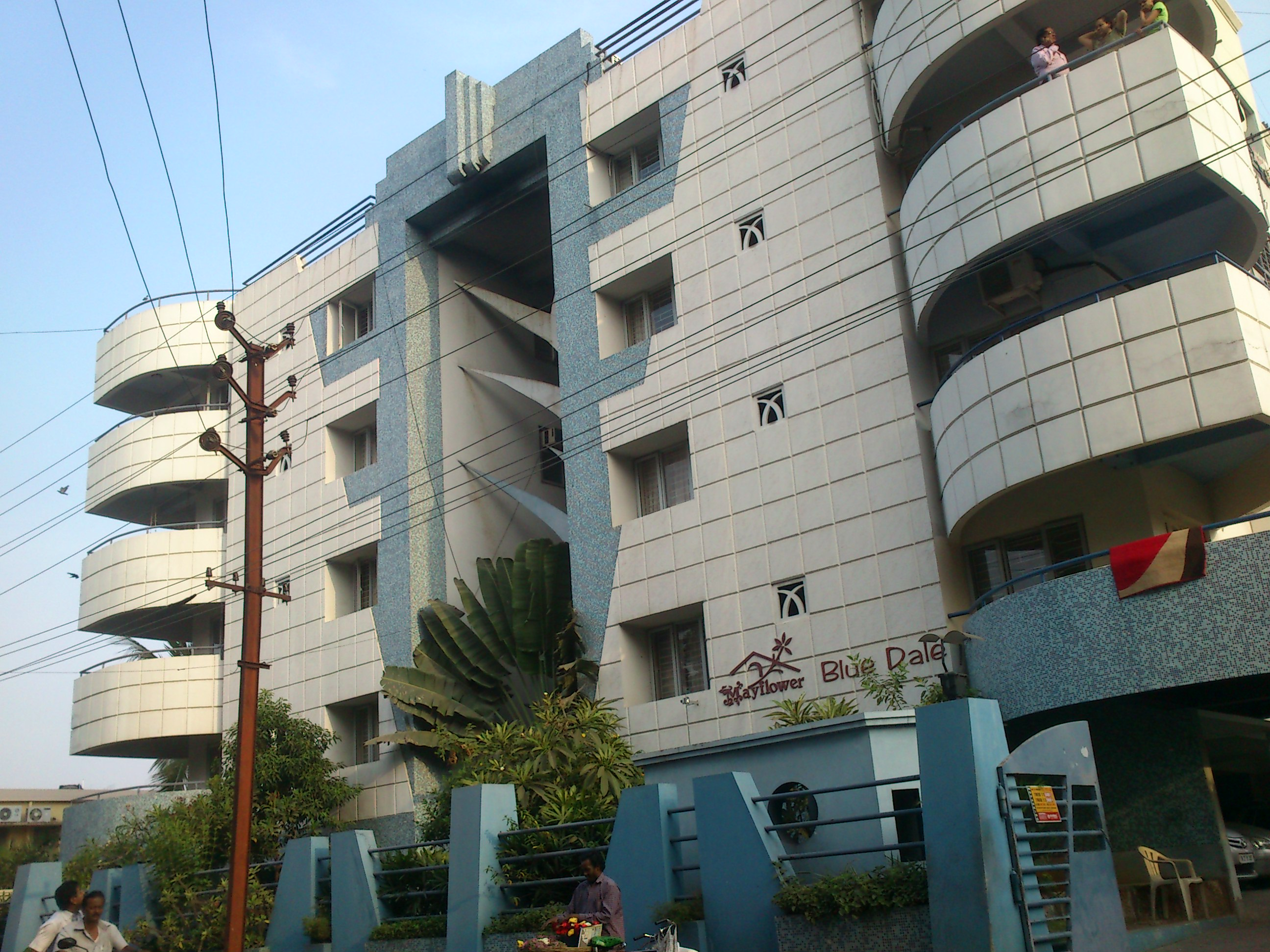
Mayflower apartments
