= UMS Technologies =

Indian engineering and manufacturing company

UMS Technologies Private Limited
- Predecessor: UMS Radio Factory
- Founded: 1941; 85 years ago in Coimbatore, India
- Founder: G. D. Naidu
- Headquarters: Coimbatore, India
- Key people: G. D. Gopal (Chairman); G. D. Rajkumar (Managing Director)
- Website: umstech.in

UMS Technologies Private Limited is an Indian engineering and manufacturing company based in Coimbatore. It is the only company in India to manufacture engines for radio-controlled aircraft. The company manufactures the world's smallest radial engine, the 35 cc glow engine.

== History ==
UMS Radio Factory was established by G. D. Naidu in Coimbatore in 1941. The company manufactured miniature models of engines of aircraft that were used in the Second World War. The company was officially incorporated in 1970. Until then, the company manufactured electronic components in an association with the German company Grundig. In the 1980s, the company manufactured television components such as amplifiers and antennae. In 2005, the company was renamed as UMS Technologies Limited.

The company manufactures engines for radio-controlled aircraft. Most of these engines are exported from India to countries including Germany, China, Japan, the United Kingdom, and the United States. On average, 350 such engines are sold annually and the distribution is handled by the American company Horizon Hobby.

In September 2012, the company started the process of replicating Benz Patent-Motorwagen, the world's first practical production automobile, which took seven months. The company also replicated the Ford Quadricycle, and the Stanley Steamer. As of 2015, the company had sold 22 Benz Patent-Motorwagens, 17 of which went were exported. and As of 2016, the company had sold 10 Ford Quadicycles. A Benz Patent-Motorwagen manufactured by the company was driven from Coimbatore to Chennai in October 2015.

In 2016, the company created a gas turbine laboratory for the Ministry of Defence. In 2026, the company was named as "India's smallest carmaker" by Autocar India.
