= Gedee Car Museum =

Vintage car museum in India

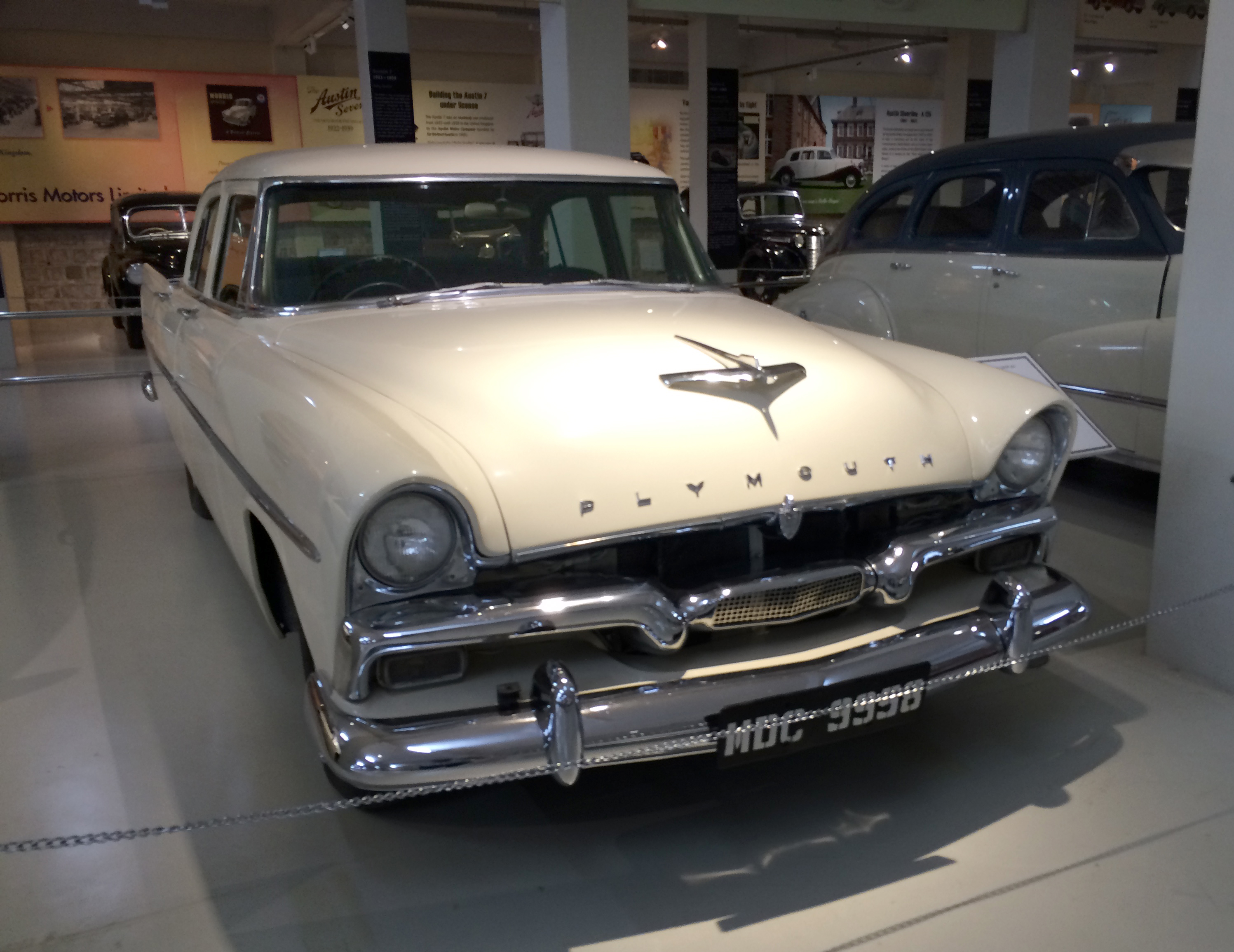
- 1956 Plymouth Plaza license-built by Premier Automobiles Limited at Gedee Car Museum
- Established: 27 April 2015; 11 years ago
- Location: 734 President Hall, Avinashi Road, Coimbatore, Tamil Nadu, India
- Coordinates: 11.006615822836036°N 76.97800103887347°E
- Type: Museum
- Collection size: 110
- Director: G. D. Gopal
- Website: gedeecarmuseum.com

Gedee Car Museum is a private vintage car museum in Coimbatore, India. It is part of the GD Museums complex, which also includes the GD Science Museum (established in 1950) and the Experimenta Science Centre (established in 2023).

== History ==
The museum was established in 2015 by G. D. Gopal in commemoration of his father, G. D. Naidu. At its inauguration, the museum featured a distinctive collection of automobiles originating from several countries including France, Germany, Japan, Spain, the United Kingdom and the United States. The collection comprised nearly 35 automobile brands and included the private collection of G D Naidu Charities, which has been acquiring and preserving these vehicles for a period of over four decades. The museum also received eight cars donated by vintage car enthusiasts.

The museum hosts a replica of Benz Patent-Motorwagen, regarded as the world's first practical production automobile. It was locally manufactured with construction beginning in September 2012 and was completed seven months later. The museum was subsequently expanded in 2019 by G. D. Rajkumar with the addition of a new exhibit dedicated to special sports cars designed by Karivardhan, which was dedicated on his 65th birth anniversary. The museum was further expanded in 2023 and 2025 with the addition of exhibits dedicated to Indian cars and performance cars, respectively. Based on his work for the museum, FIVA inducted Gopal into the Hall of Fame in 2025.

== Collections ==
As of August 2023, the museum occupied an area of 23,500 ft^{2} (2,180 m^{2}) and had 110 cars on display.

=== Gallery ===
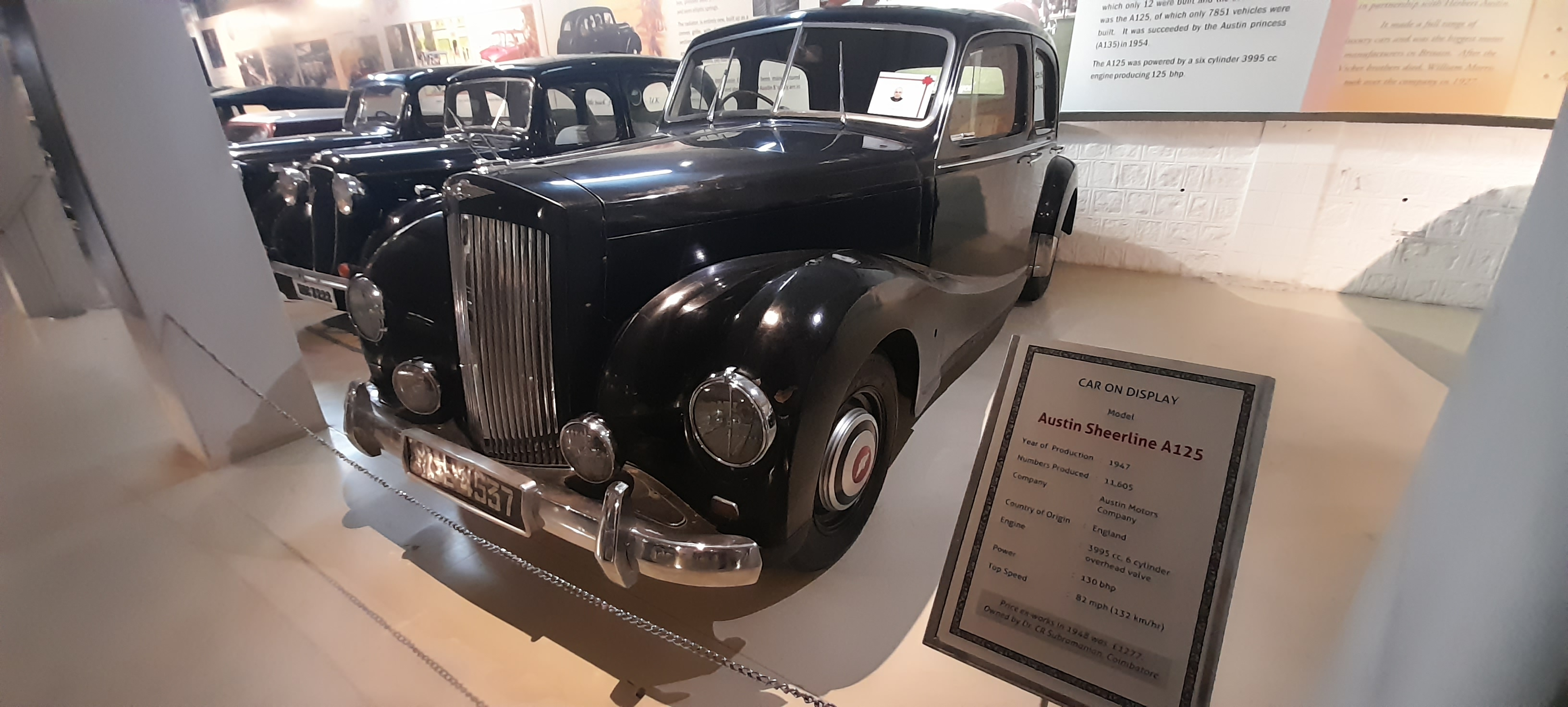
1947 Austin Sheerline A125

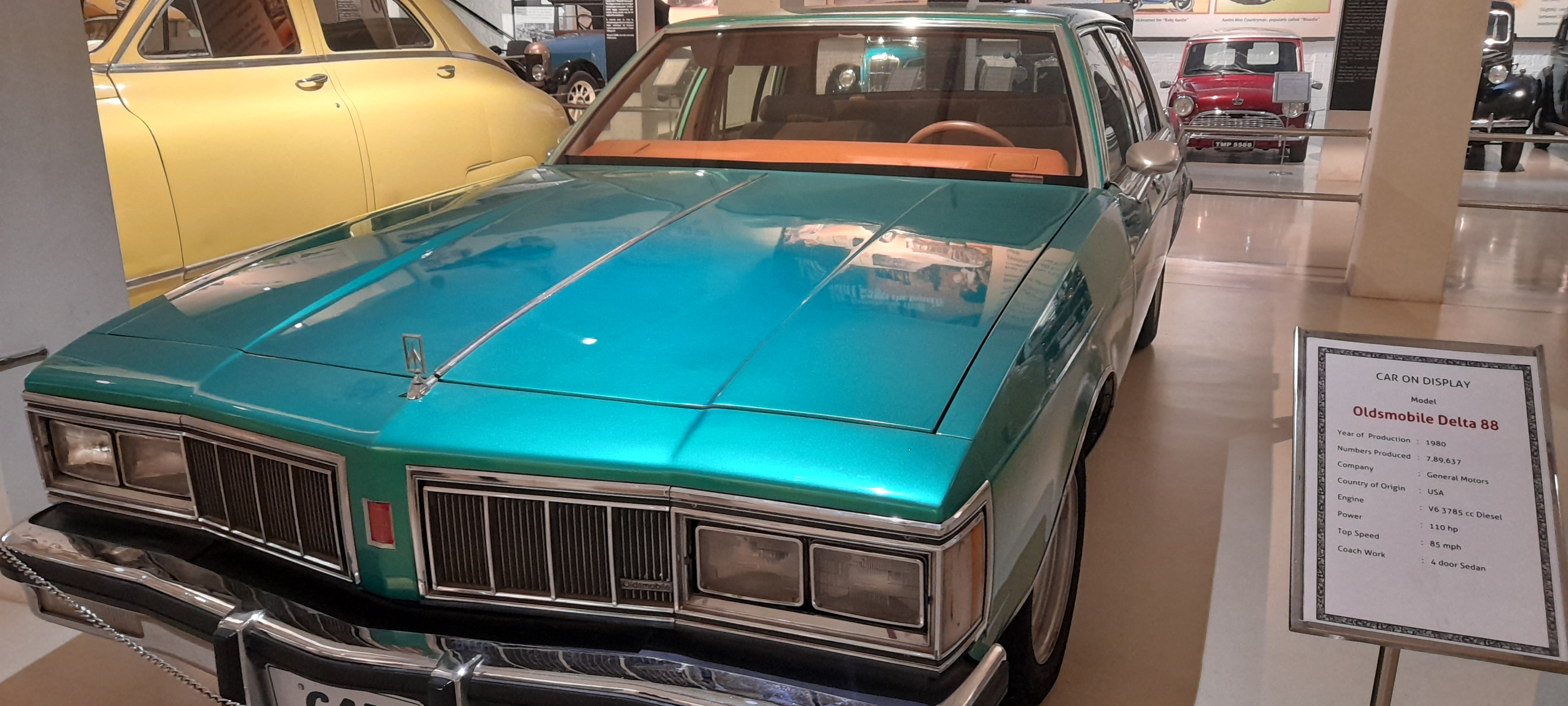
1980 Oldsmobile Delta 88

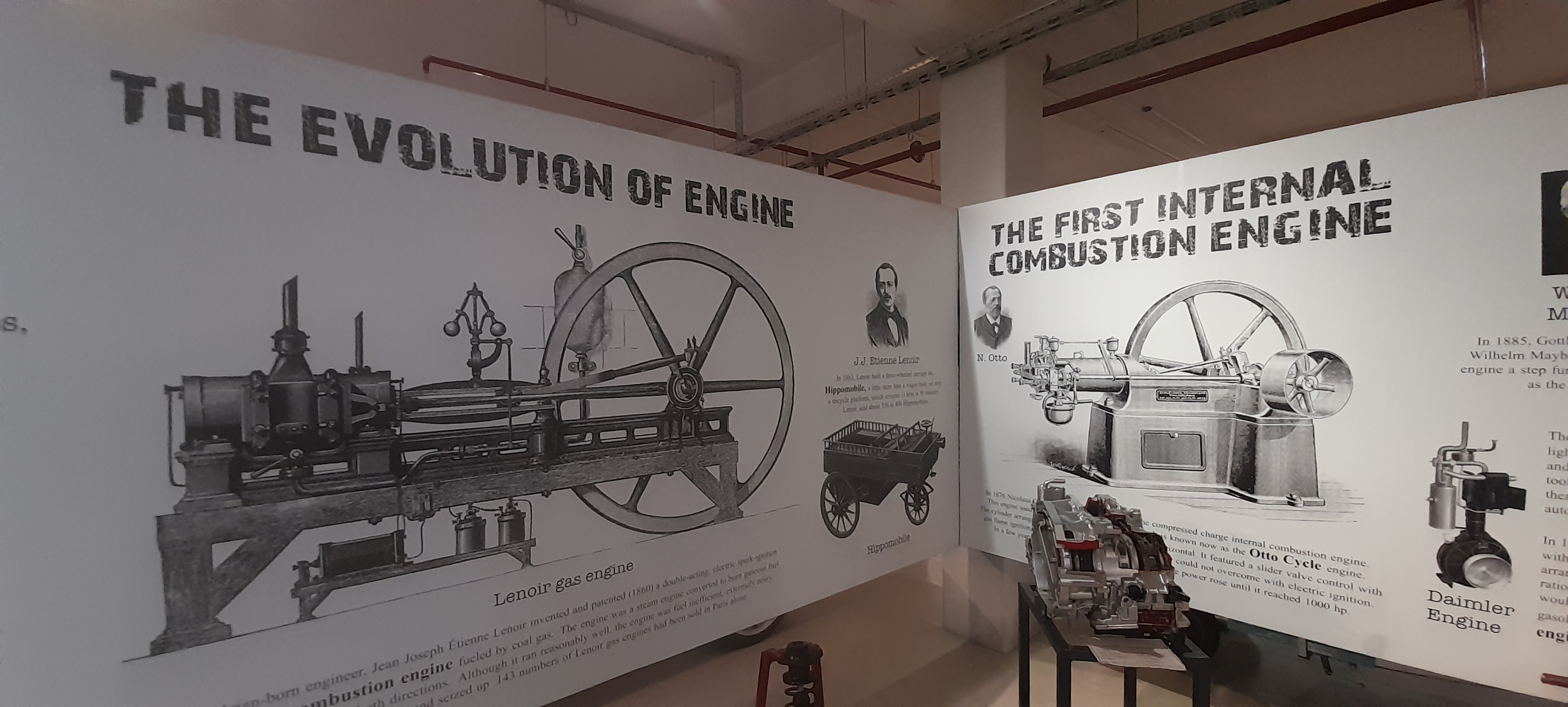
Interior of the Gedee Car Museum
