= Siruvani Dam =

Siruvani dam
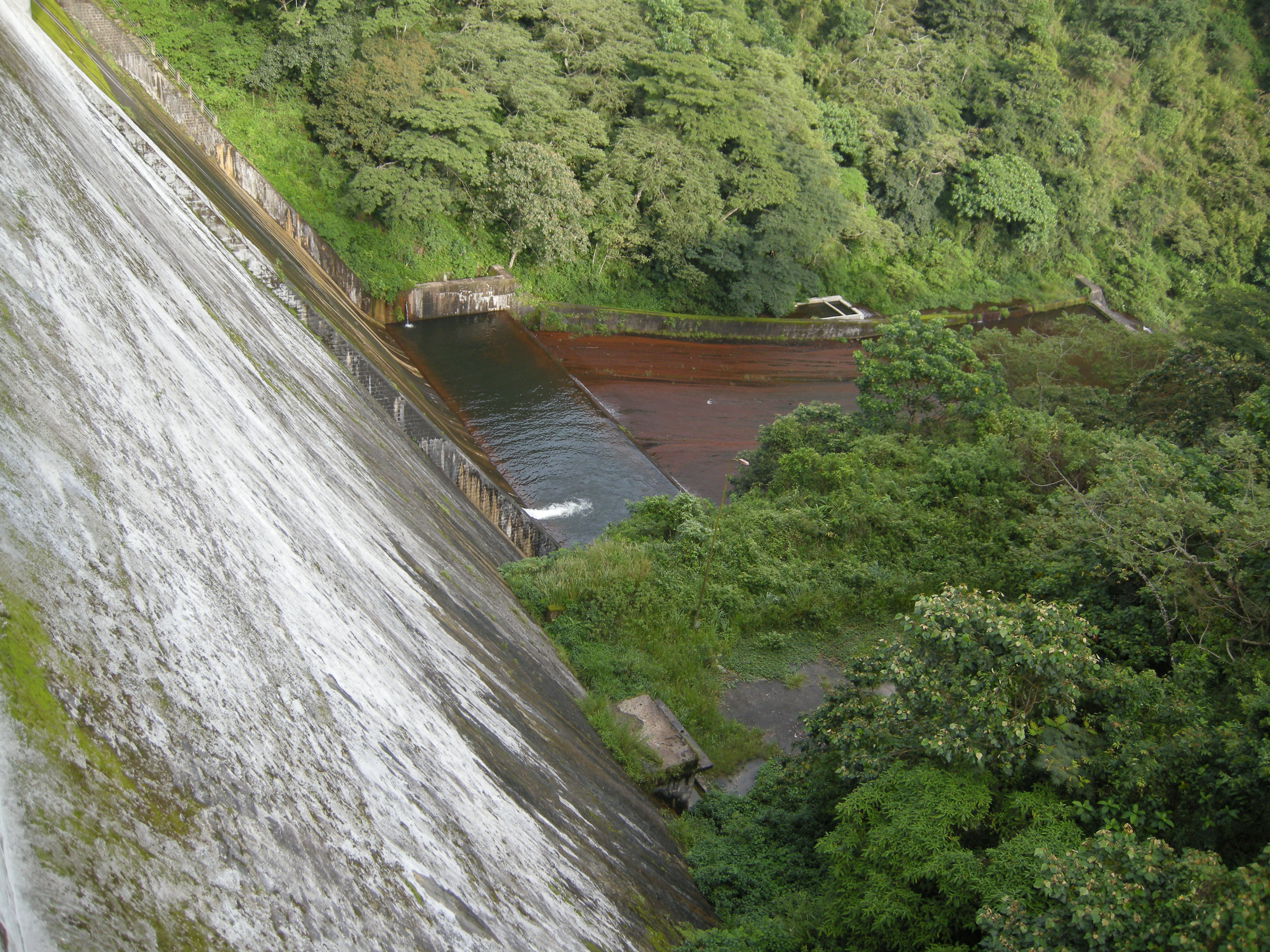

- Location in Kerala Location in India
- Official name: ശിരുവാണി അണക്കെട്ട്
- Location: Attappadi, Palakkad district, Kerala
- Coordinates: 10.9767°N 76.642°E
- Purpose: Water Supply
- Opening date: 1984

Dam and spillways
- Impounds: Siruvani River
- Height: 57 metres (187 ft)
- Length: 224 metres (735 ft)

Reservoir
- Total capacity: 255,000,000 m^{3} (206,732 acre⋅ft) (9 tmc ft)
- Active capacity: 184,200,000 m^{3} (149,333 acre⋅ft) (6.5 tmc ft)

Siruvani dam is a dam in Palakkad District, Kerala located 46 km away from Palakkad town. This dam constructed across the Siruvani River, is for supplying drinking water to the city of Coimbatore in Tamil Nadu. The dam is surrounded by reserve forests. Muthikulam hill is situated on the eastern side of the dam. There is a natural waterfall in the hill. The waterfalls and the Dam are big tourist attractions. The famous 150-year-old Pattiyar Bungalow is on the banks of the Siruvani Reservoir. An agreement was executed in August 1973 between the state Governments for drinking water supply to Coimbatore town and neighbouring areas from the Siruvani Dam. The location being in the state of Kerala, the project was executed by the Kerala Public Works Department using the funds made available by the Tamil Nadu Government. The gross storage capacity of the dam is 9 tmc ft

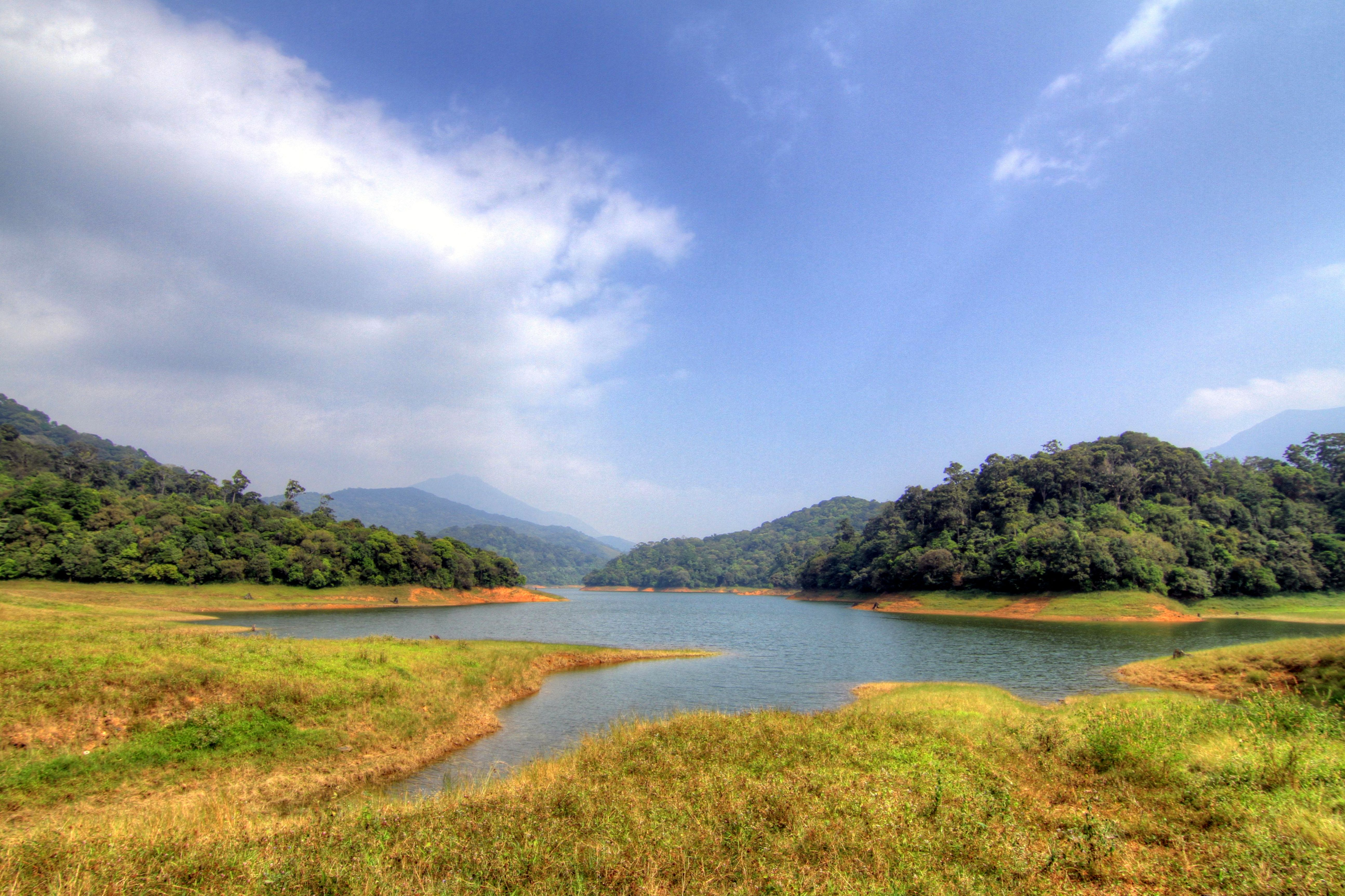
Reservoir seen from the west end

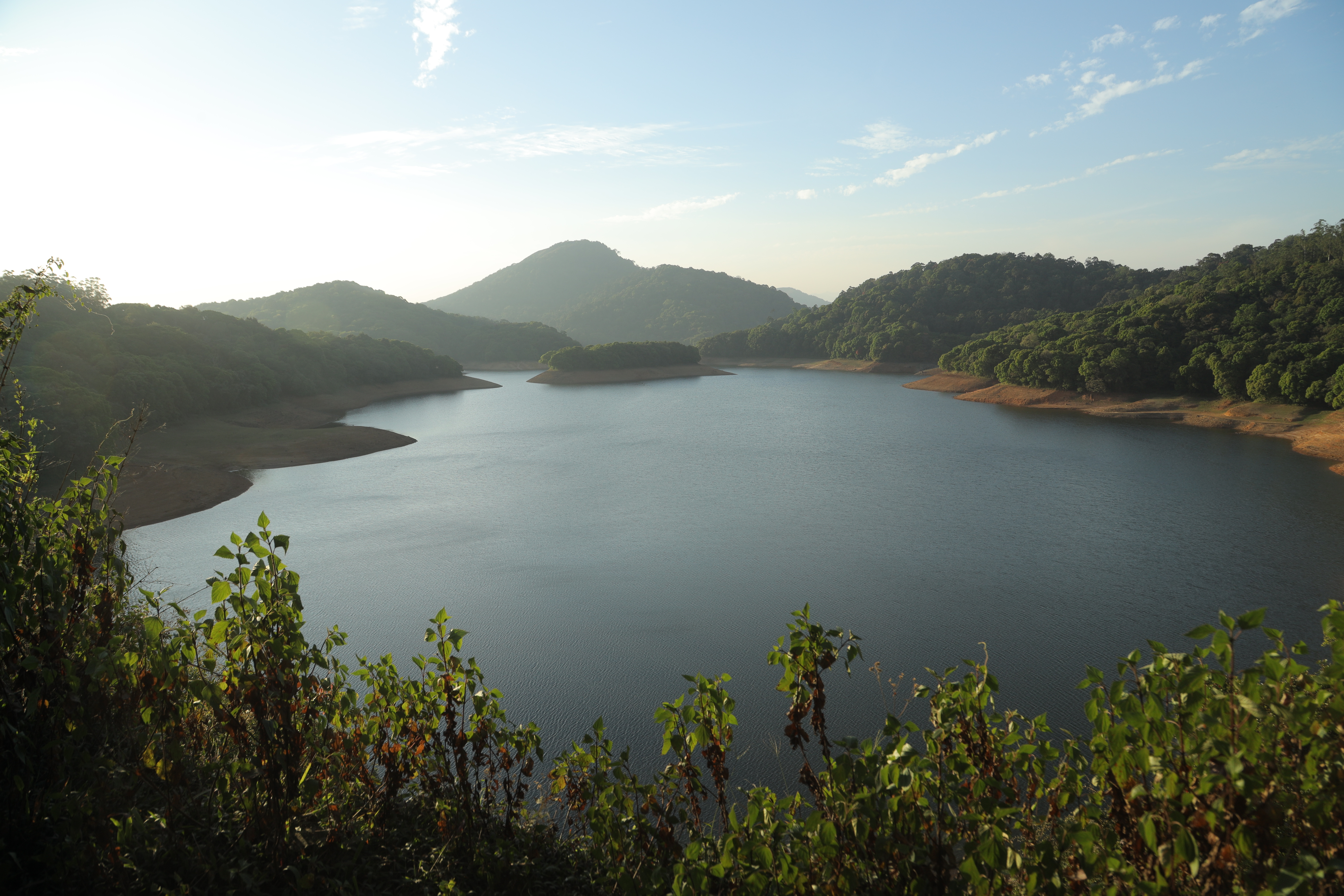
Reservoir seen from the southeast.

== See also ==
- List of reservoirs and dams in India
- Coimbatore district
- Siruvani Waterfalls
