= C. S. Ratnasabhapathy Mudaliar =

Indian Industrialist and politician

Diwan Bahadur C. S. Ratnasabhapathy Mudaliar
- Born: 9 March 1886
- Died: 1956
- Known for: Being an able planner and administrator.
- Notable work: Bringing Siruvani water to Coimbatore. Ensuring Pykara hydel power to the city.
- Office: Chairman of Coimbatore Municipality
- Term: 1921 - 1936

Diwan Bahadur Chinna Seevaram Ratnasabhapathy Mudaliar was an Indian industrialist and politician who served as a member of the Madras Legislative Council from 1926 to 1936. His family hails from Seevaram village near Cheyyar of North Arcot district.

== Personal life ==
Ratnasabhapathy Mudaliar was born on 9 March 1886, into a wealthy family in business in Coimbatore.

== Career ==
He was educated at Coimbatore and served as a member of the Coimbatore Municipal Council from 1906 to 1926 serving as its Chairman from 1921 to 1936.

Ratnasabhapathy Mudaliar was an active Indian independence activist and collected funds for V. O. Chidambaram Pillai's Swadeshi Steam Navigation Company.

== Awards and titles ==
He was awarded the Dewan Bahadur title, in honour of his contributions to the city and the country.

== Legacy ==
A key area in Coimbatore city R. S. Puram is named after him for his contributions to the city. A street in also named after him as DB Road (Dewan Bahadur).

== Sources ==
- C. Francis (1992). C. S. Ratnasabhapathy Mudaliar (PDF). p. 286. Archived from the original (PDF) on 21 July 2011.
