= Siruvani River =

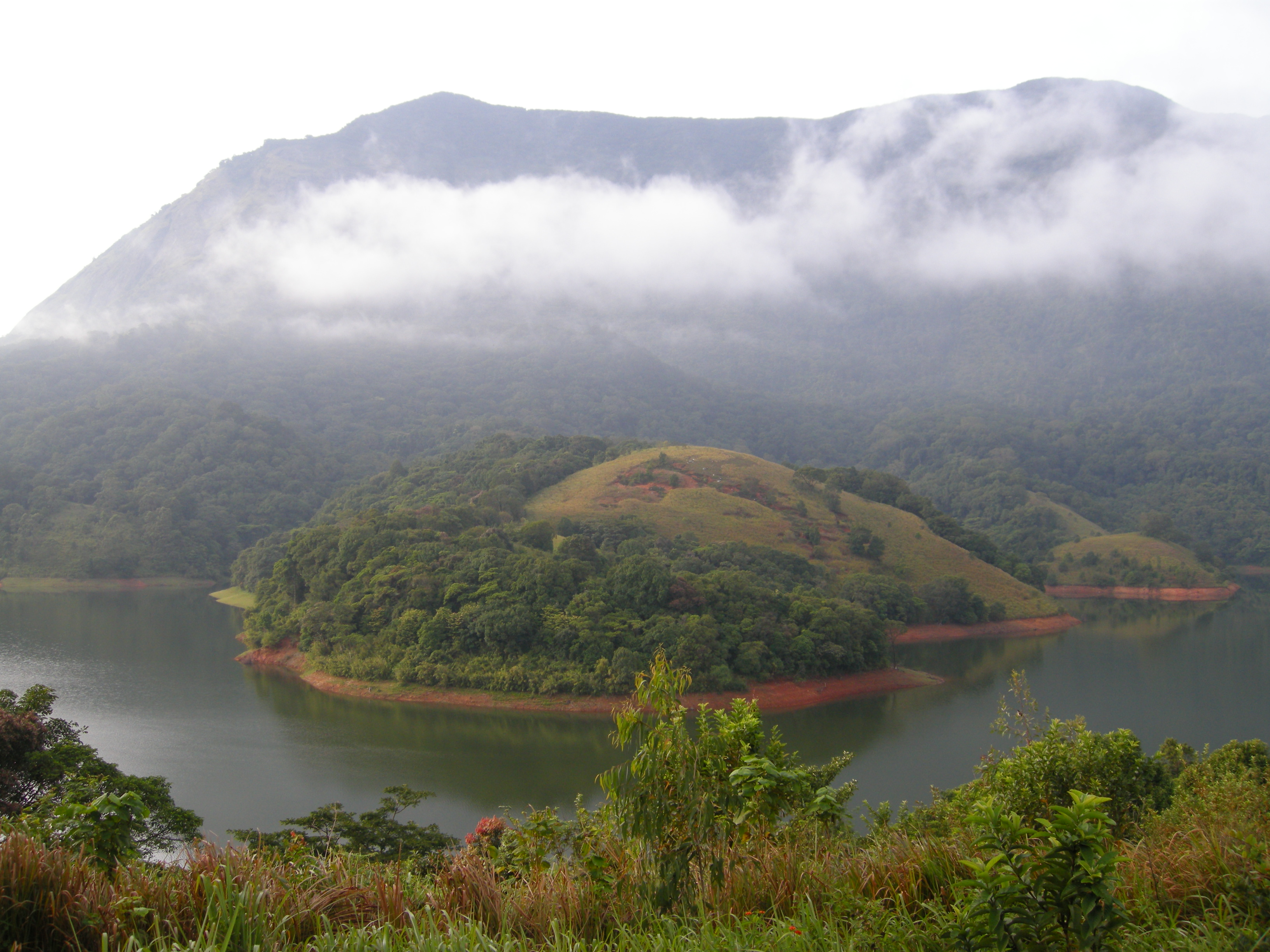
- Map

The Siruvani River is a river near Coimbatore, India. It is a tributary of the Bhavani river, which in turn is a tributary of the Kaveri. Part of the Siruvani River is near Mannarkkad in the Indian District of Palakkad, Kerala. The river leads into two big tourist attractions in Southern India, namely, the Siruvani Dam and the Siruvani Waterfalls. Banan Fort and the Siruvani Dam, are 15 to 25 kilometres (9 to 16 mi) west of Coimbatore city. The river has a village named after it, or possibly vice versa.

== Dam ==
In 2012, the Government of Kerala proposed the construction of a check dam on the river to ensure use of the state's allocation of water under the Kaveri Tribunal. Tamil Nadu opposed this plan citing that it would disrupt water supply to the city of Coimbatore and would affect inflow into the River Bhavani, therefore affecting agriculture in the Erode and Tirupur districts. Tamil Nadu has threatened to take up the matter with the Supreme Court of India. It receives the Siruvani River, a perennial stream of Palakkad District, and gets reinforced by the Kundah river before entering Erode District in Sathyamangalam Tamil Nadu.
