= Diwan Bahadur Road =

Road in Coimbatore, India

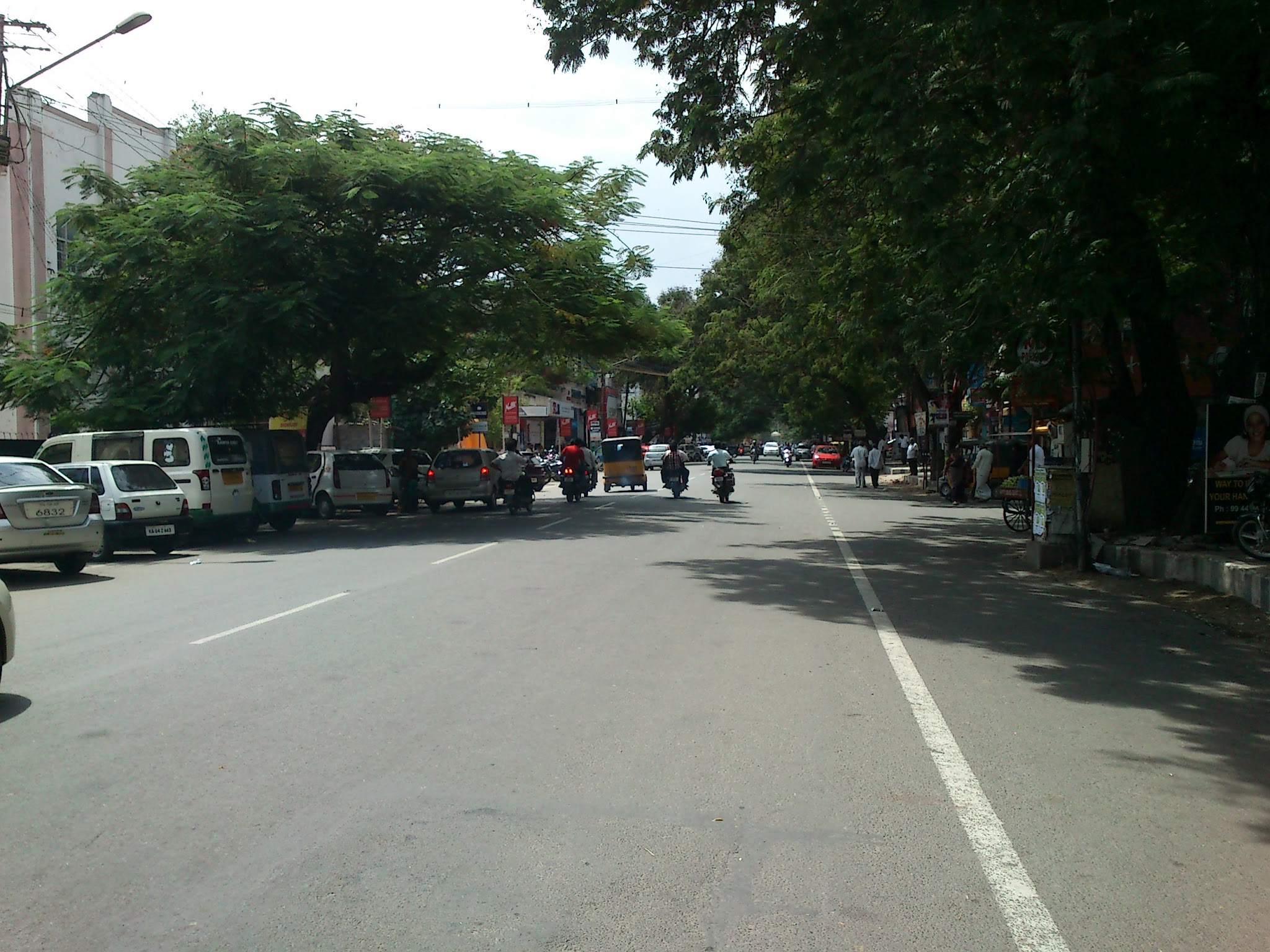
Diwan Bahadur Road in Coimbatore

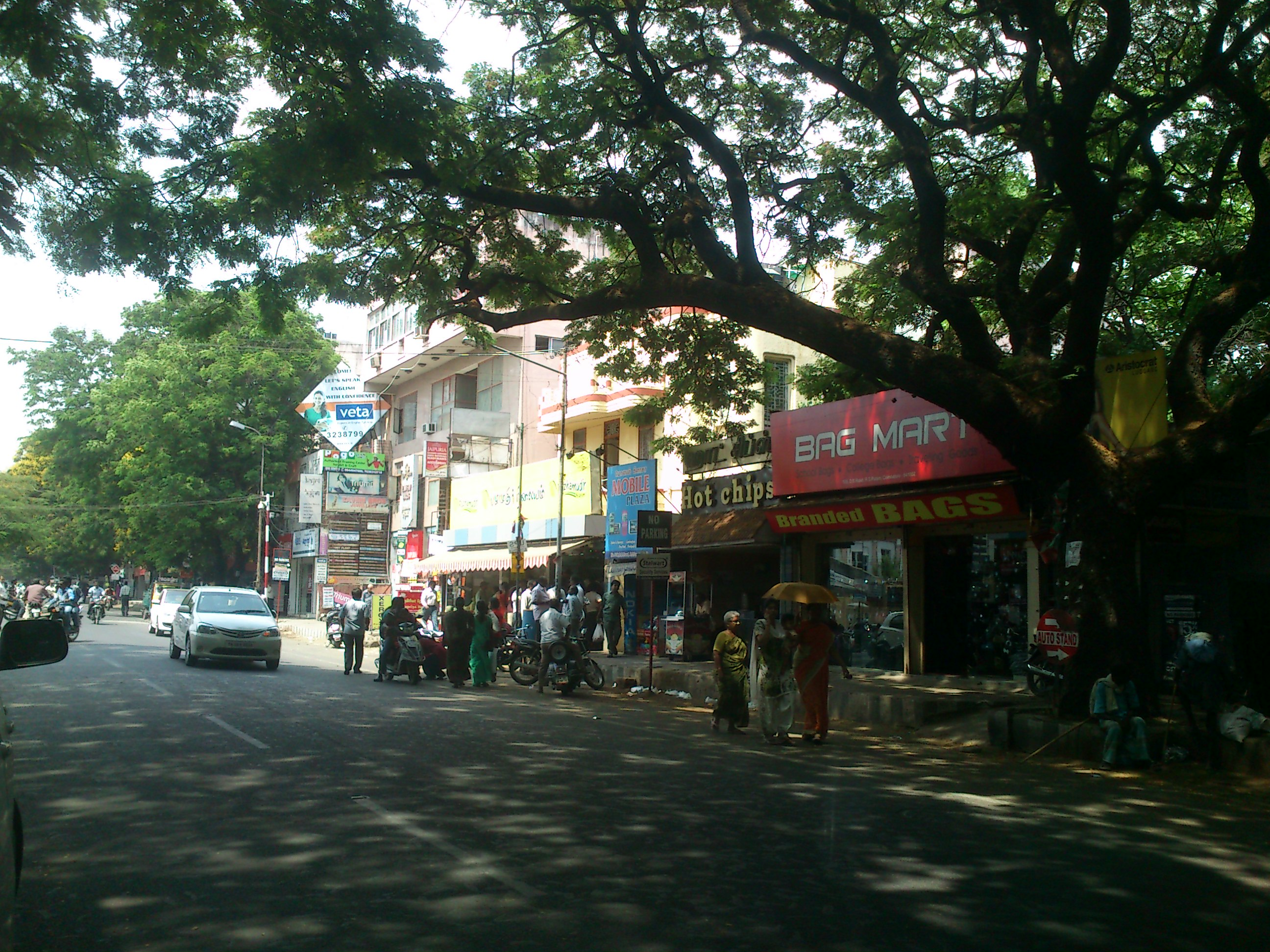
DB Road

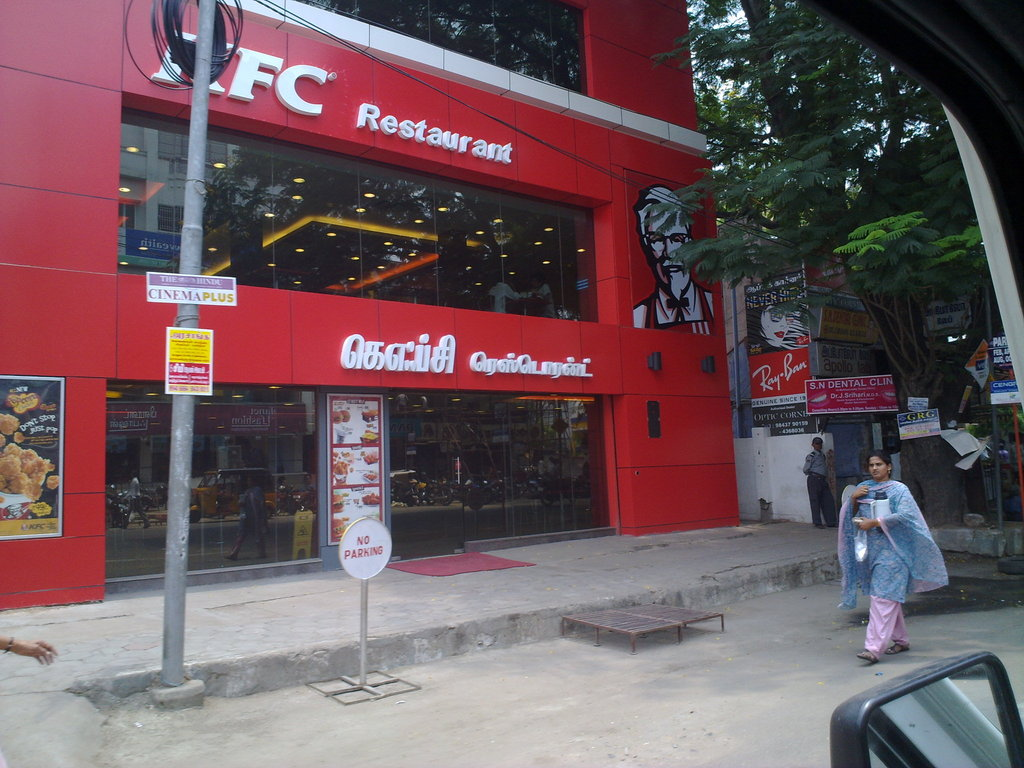
KFC restaurant on Diwan Bahadur road

Diwan Bahadur Road also known as D.B. Road is a road in Coimbatore, India. It runs from Cowley Brown Road at one end to Gandhipark at the other. Diwan Bahadur Road is one of the biggest commercial centres and busiest shopping areas of Coimbatore, India. It is located in R.S Puram and runs through the central heart of the city. D.B Road is exactly located between MTP Road and Thadagam Road. DB road is known for its traditional trade in garments and textiles, jewellery, Marvadies, and pawn brokering. It has many shopping centres and retail outlets of international brands. It has many shops, restaurants, bars, and other happening places.

== History ==
According to old timers, people of Coimbatore started trickling to D.B. Road, which was then the Rathina Sabapathy Puram Street during 1930–40. The road abutted a burial ground, parts of which are today's Shastri Maidan. Mr. C.R.V. Dass constructed a house on D.B. Road in 1942, and had his bakery on Raja Street - another busy commercial street in Coimbatore city, with an on premises store named "Ayyar and Co" at 221 Raja Street, which is still functional and now owned by his elder son Mr. V. Ramakrishnan. The street was lined with trees on both sides with street lights planted firmly on the middle of the road, in the median. A few years later – when the powers to grant approval for shops was available with the Coimbatore Municipality – the "Ayyar and Co." founder managed to open a branch at D.B. Road. Then there were very few shops – among those were "Ramoo and Company", which rationed mill cloth, and "Latha Stores", which sold general household goods and served as a one stop prominent store for various general goods, and "A. Rangaswamy Chettiar Sons and Company". Very few buses passed through D.B. Road. Two of those were No.6 and 7, which run from Gandhipark to Gandhipark, with a stop at Ramoo and Co. The shop lent its name to a bus stop because people who wanted uniforms and mill cloth thronged the shop, says N.P. Kumar, the shop owner. His father N.A. Parasuraman established the shop before Independence. In his assessment, the growth of D.B. Road is intrinsically linked to the growth of residential localities west of the Tamil Nadu Agricultural University. As the number of houses grew, the first stop for the people of those areas was D.B. Road.The other reason was the width of D.B. Road. And also that of T.V. Samy Road. The two broad roads presented ideal destinations for shopping as there was ample spacing for parking and walking, says Jegan S. Damodarasamy, Executive Director, Sree Annapoorna Sree Gowrishankar Group of Hotels. His family first started the Annapoorna hotels as a standalone unit on D.B. Road in 1968

The southern side of the D.B. Road then housed shops that sold charcoal. Today, untouched by the presence of international brands, that portion of the Road continues to have shops that sell earthenware – perhaps, presenting a balance between local and international economy. One another important landmark on the road is the Rathina Vinayakar Temple, started by Rathina Sabapathy Mudaliar, his family and many important persons of R.S. Puram. The temple continues to serve as a hub for R.S. Puram residents. The D.B. Road also saw several city institutions take their toddler steps from here. One such is Nirmala College. The college functioned here for a while before moving to its present location. The Road is also home to a few cultural institutions like Bharatiya Vidya Bhavan and Purandaradasar Hall, which satiate the cultural and artistic needs of the city's residents. Today, it is a happening place in Coimbatore as every commercial establishments wants a foothold there, be it local or international. For such is the Road's reputation. The road today is synonymous with brand-conscious shopping and has become a commercial hub, just as Dr.Nanjappa Road in Gandhipuram is for engineering goods, Mettupalayam Road for hardware and T.V. Swamy Road for kitchen accessories, says Sreesh Adka, Managing Partner, Ideal Stores. His is one of the oldest inhabitants of R.S Puram and D.B. Road. And it will continue to grow that way because it is not yet congested as Oppanakara Street is. In talking about the growth of R.S. Puram and D.B. Road in particular the 1998 Coimbatore bombings cannot be overlooked. Economic activity came to a standstill but only for a brief while.
