= Siruvani Waterfalls =

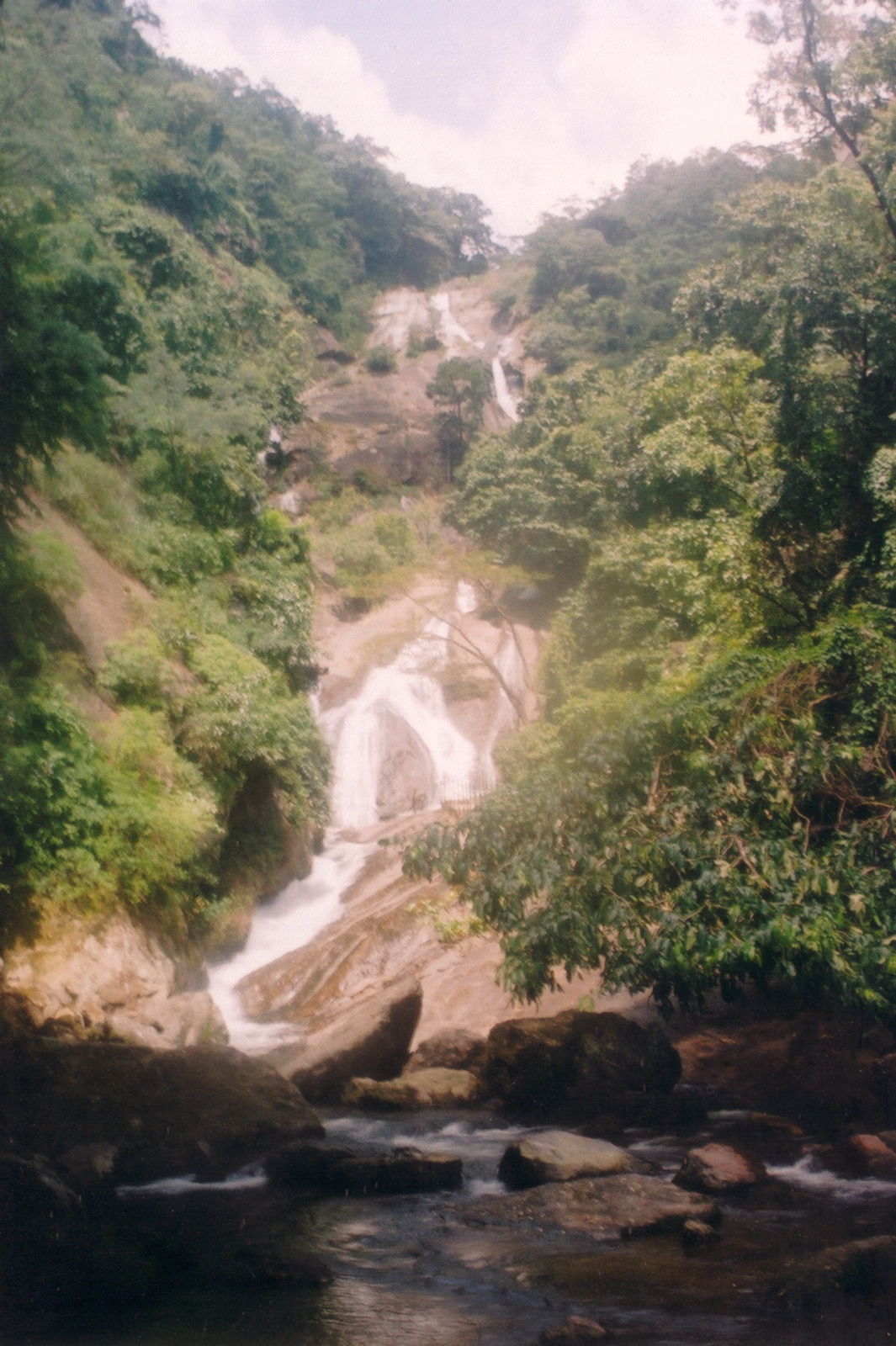
- Upper cascades of the Siruvani Waterfalls
- Interactive map of Siruvani Waterfalls
- Location: Coimbatore District, Tamil Nadu, India
- Coordinates: 10.938011°N 76.687177°E
- Type: Cascade
- Watercourse: Siruvani River

Siruvani Waterfalls (and the dam named after it) is located 36 km (22 mi) west of Coimbatore in the Western Ghats in India. The reservoir at Siruvani was built by the Indian government for Tamil Nadu, and funded by the Tamil Nadu government, to meet the drinking water requirements of Coimbatore. The gateways on either side of the road across the dam showcase typical Kerala and Tamil architectural styles. Siruvani is also home to indigenous tribes like the Mudugar and Irulas. The area has become a popular spot for ecotourism.

== History of the dam ==
The government approved the construction of the masonry gravity dam in February 1915. Work was delayed, according to information from the Archaeology Department, Tamil Nadu Water Supply and Drainage (TWAD) Board, and the district gazette. Initially, the villagers of Boluvampatti and Alandurai opposed the scheme, as they feared it would affect their way of life. However, the benefits of additional water to the growing villages outweighed their initial apprehension.

The construction of the dam began in 1927. The site is located in rugged terrain, with hazards including wild animals. Construction workers stayed in the guest house near Iruttu Pallam. Forest guards continue to accompany those who visit the dam. The initial cost of construction was Rs. 2,17,725 for 7 meters (23 feet). The site was selected because it had perennial streams. The areas below the Siruvani, Muthikulam Falls, Gobiyaru, Solaiyaru, Pattiyaru, Veeraru, and Paambaru Falls, the primary sources of supply, were identified for construction.

There were plans to commission a hydroelectric project at Siruvani, but the move was dropped as the Pykara project in the Nilgiris was mooted at the time. Major and minor construction works continued until 1984, and the total cost was Rs. 26.12 crores (Rs. 261.2 million). The water drawn from the dam in 1931 was 113 lakh litres for a population of more than 95,000. In the 1970s, the water drawn was scaled down to 130 lakh litres from 186 lakh litres in the summer, as inflow into the Muthikulam reduced by half.

== Gallery ==
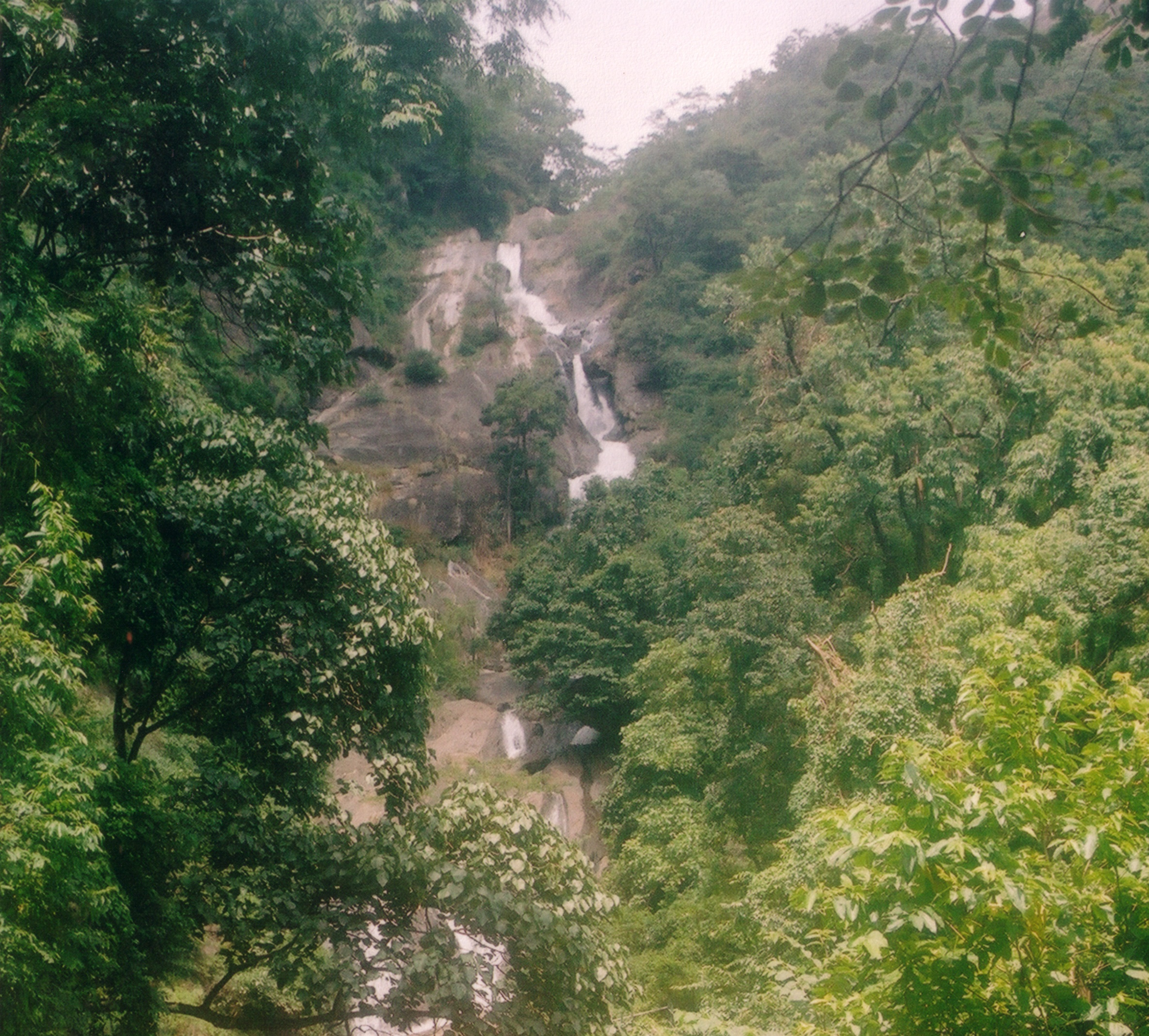
View of Siruvani falls from path towards falls

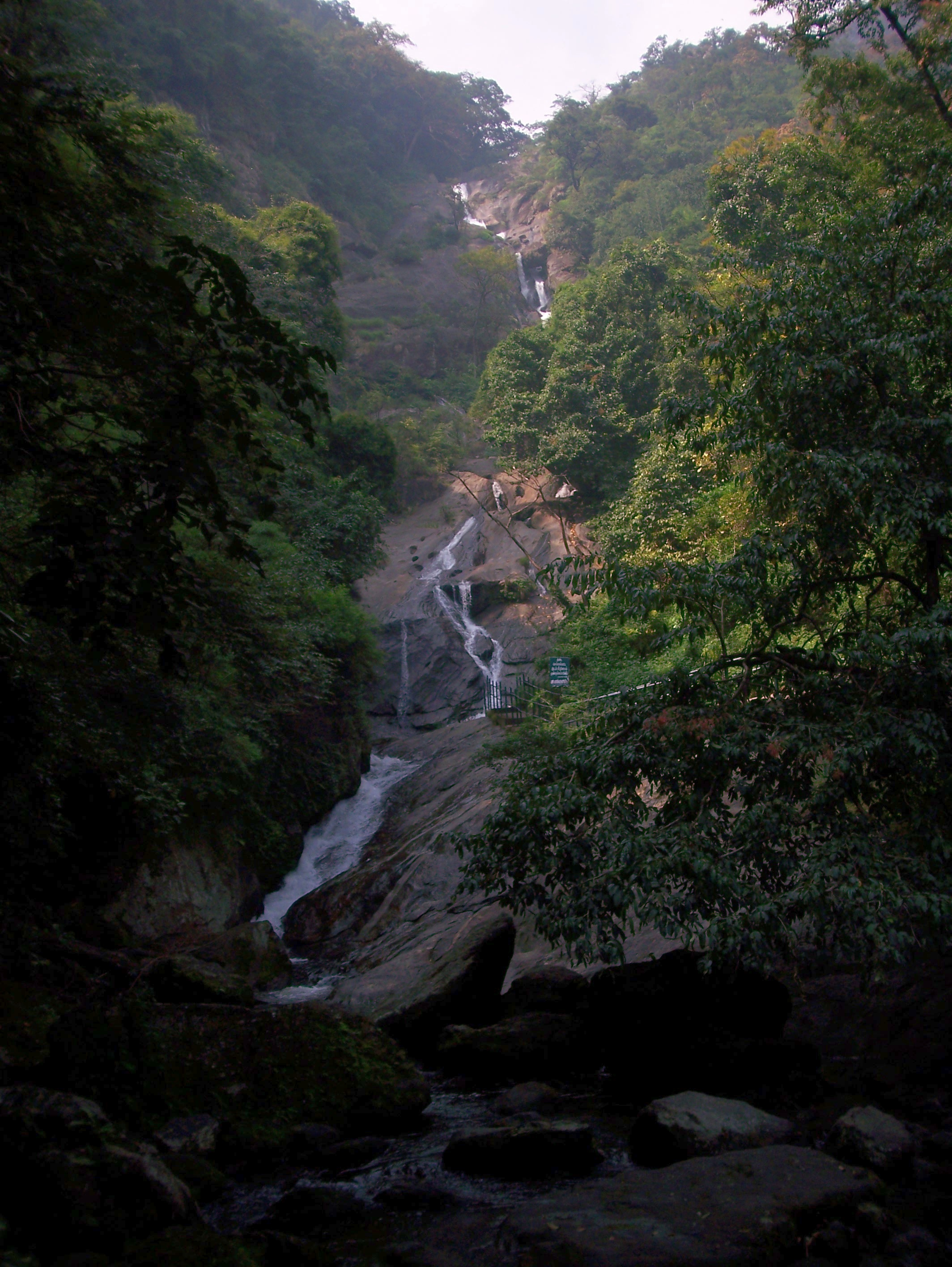
View of all cascades of Siruvani falls above the bathing area

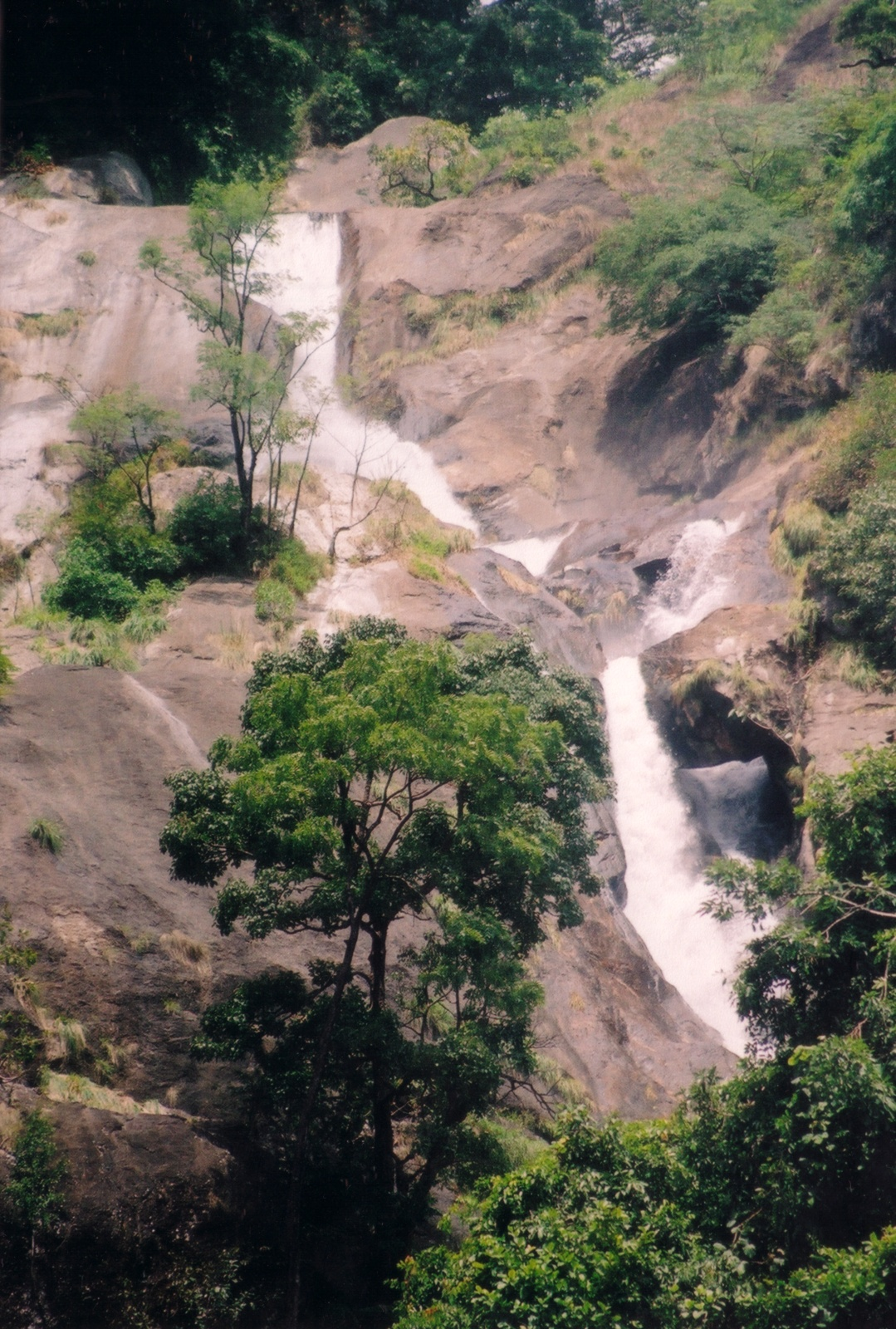
View of upper cascades above the bathing area

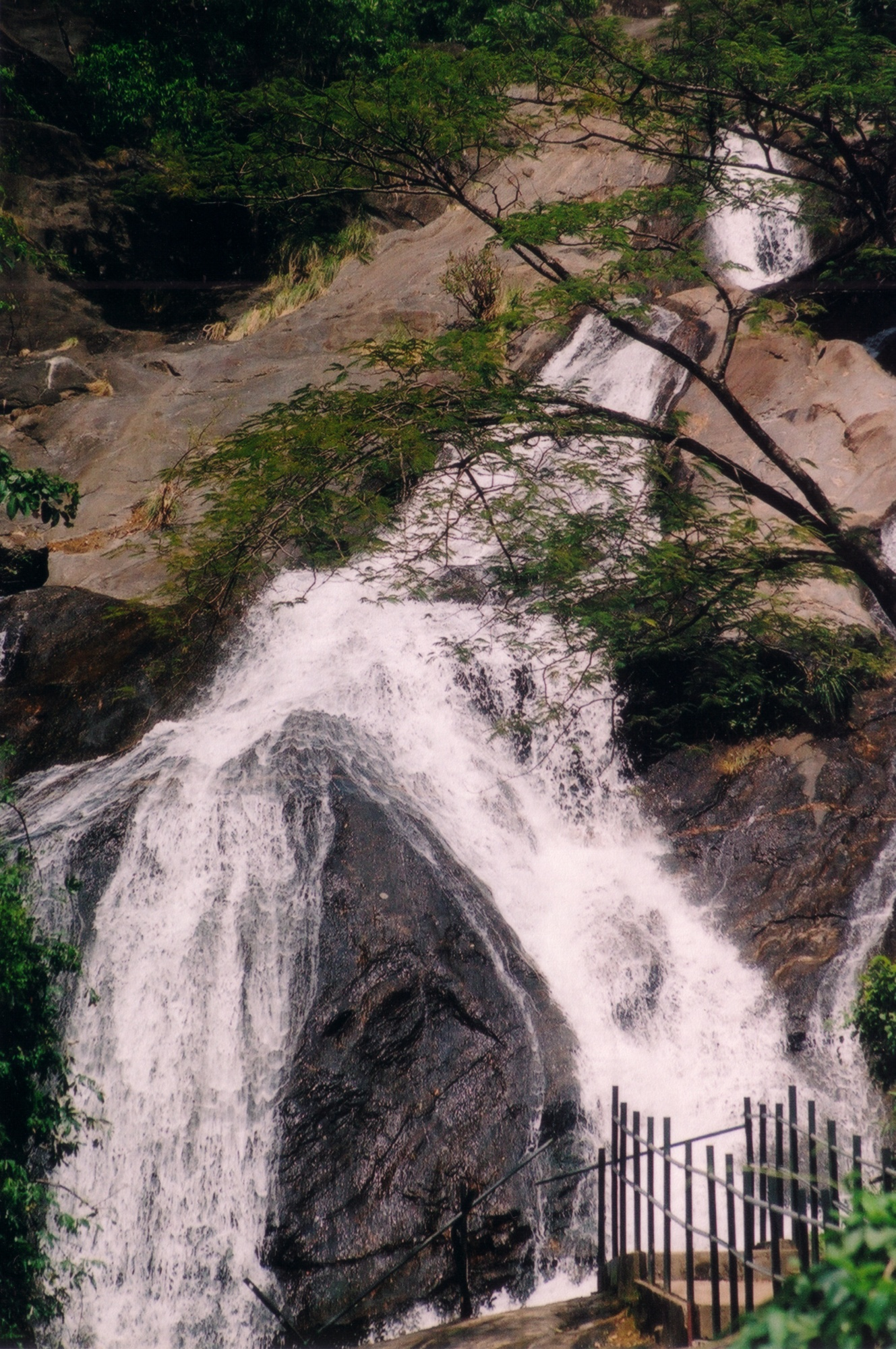
View of lower cascades above the bathing area

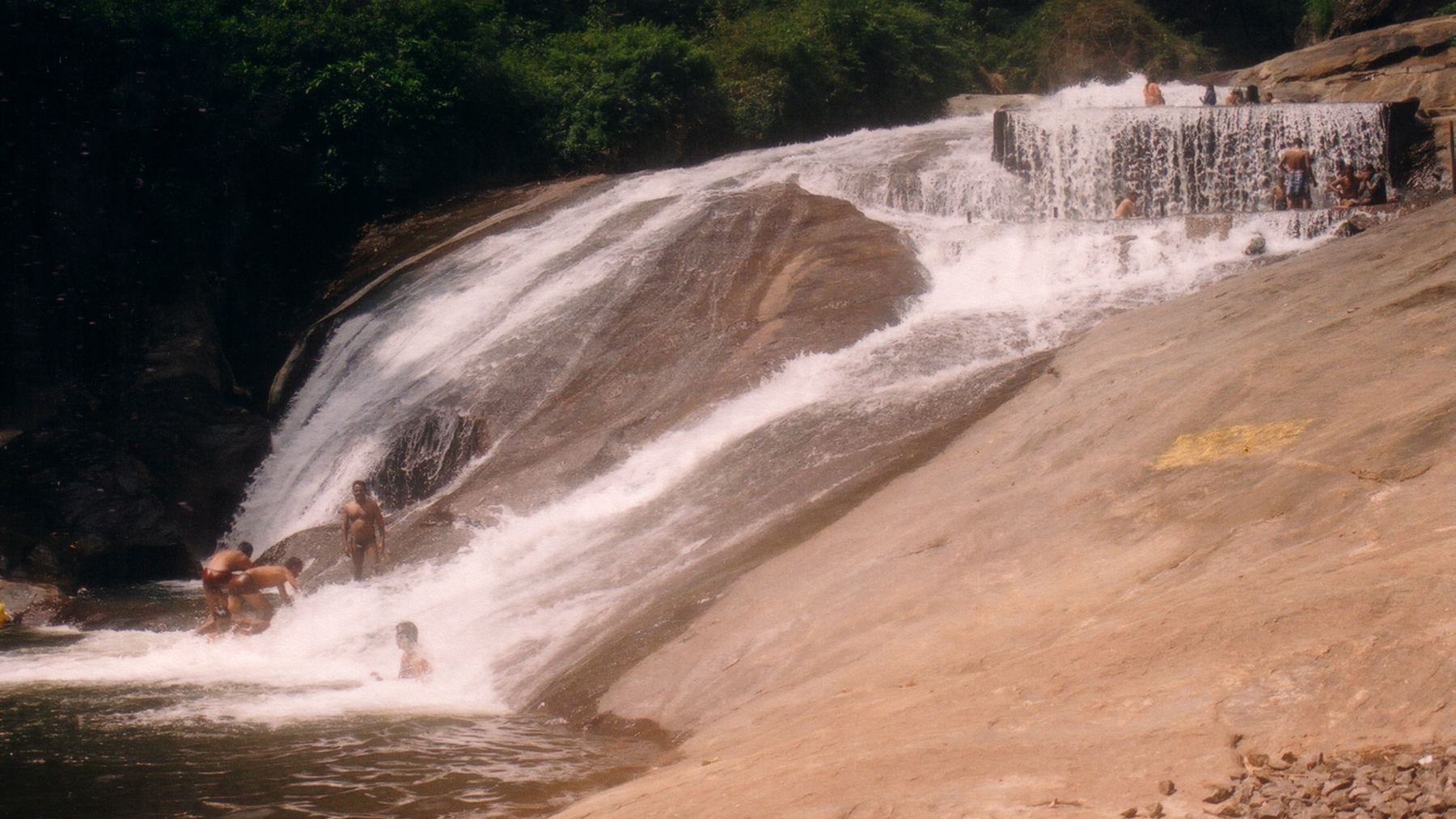
Bathing area below the main cascades of the falls

== See also ==
- List of waterfalls
- List of waterfalls in India
