= Transport in Coimbatore =

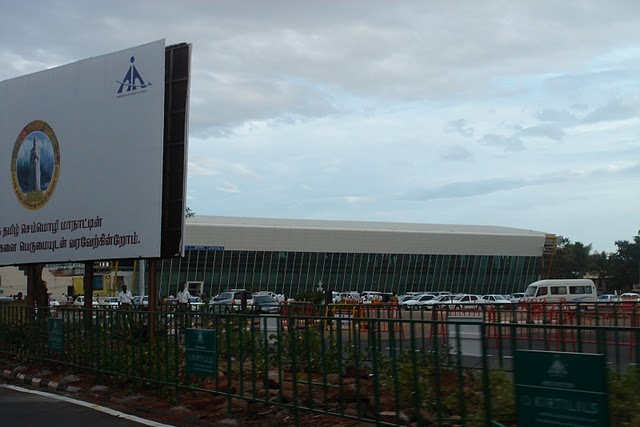
Coimbatore International Airport front view

Coimbatore is a city in the state of Tamil Nadu, India. Most transportation in the city and suburbs is by road. Coimbatore is well-connected to most cities and towns in India by road, rail, and air, but not through waterways. The city has successful transport infrastructure compared to other Indian cities, though road infrastructures are not well maintained and developed according to the growing needs of transport, making traffic congestion a major problem in the city. A comprehensive transport development plan has been made to address many traffic problems.

== Roads ==
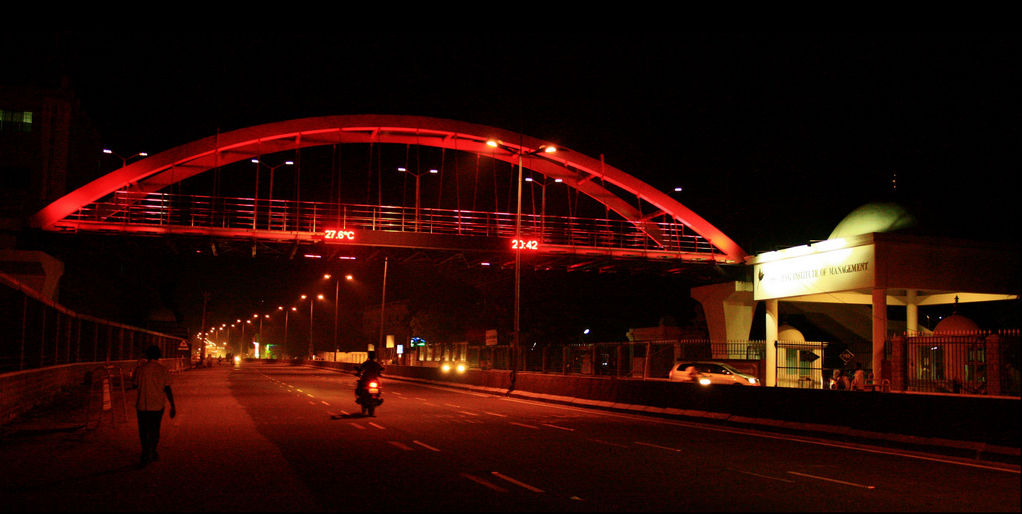
Avinashi Road is one of the most important arterial roads in the city.

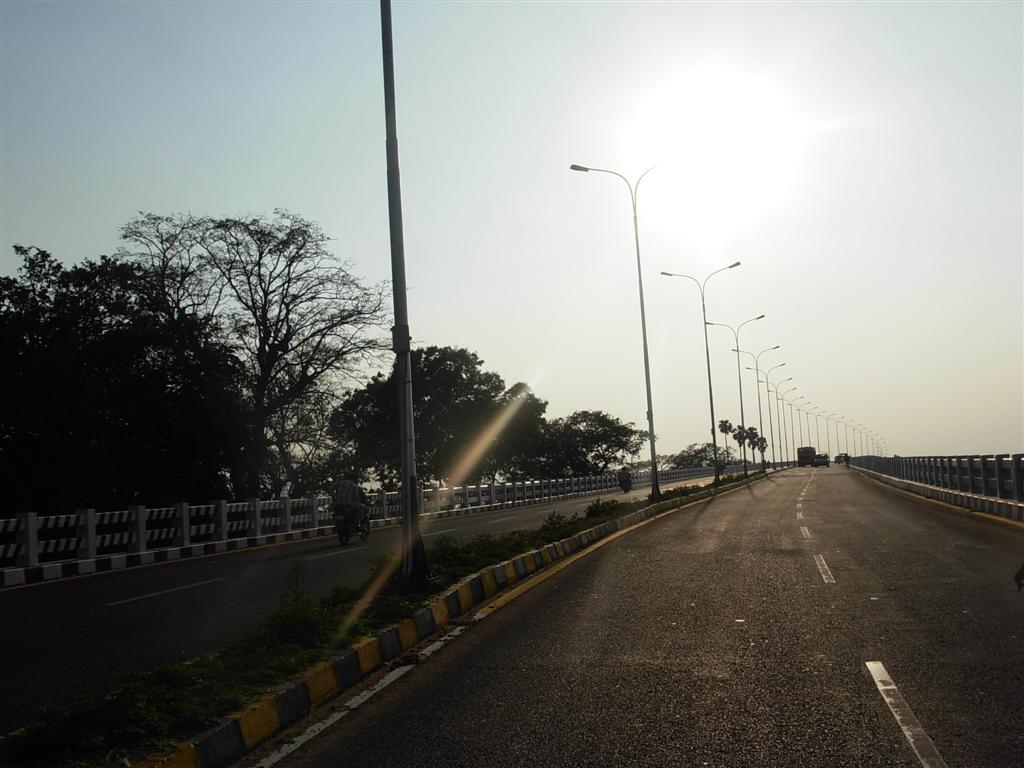
Sungam-Ukkadam bypass bridge

The Coimbatore city and metropolitan area is divided into five administrative zones (East, West, North, South and Central) which are served by major arterial roads. Avinashi Road is one of the city's most important arterial roads, traversing most of Central and East Coimbatore. It is part of National Highway 544, which connects to Salem and Ernakulam. Other arterials include Trichy Road (central–southeast), Mettupalayam Road (north–south), Sathy Road (south–northeast), Palakkad Road (east–west), Pollachi Road (north–south), and Thadagam Road (east–west). Other roads include 100 Feet Road, Bharatiyar Road, Dr. Nanjappa Road, Balasundarum Road, Crosscut Road (in the Gandhipuram commercial district), Diwhan Bahadhur Road (DB Road), TV Swamy Road, Brooke Bond Road in RS Puram, and Race Course Road. Maruthamalai Road starts at the intersection of Lawley Road Junction and connects to the neighbourhood of Vadavalli and the Maruthamalai foothills.

In January 2012, the Coimbatore Corporation announced that they would be laying around ten roads by mixing plastic. Parts of the district, including Kurudampalayam, continue turning plastic waste into pavement.

=== National Highways ===
Five major National Highways radiate outward from Coimbatore:

- NH 544 (Salem–Kochi Highway)
- NH 81 (new NH code for Trichy Road) towards Karur, Trichy, Thanjavur and Tiruchchirappalli.
- NH 181 (Mettupalayam Road) towards Ooty and Gudalur leading to Karnataka.
- NH 948 (Sathy Road; formerly NH 209) towards Mysore, Bangaluru, Chamrajnagar and Kanakapura.
- NH 83 (Pollachi Road) towards Dindigul, Trichy, Thanjavur and Nagapattinam, Palani and Oddanchatram.

=== Ring roads ===
A major bypass was built by Larsen & Toubro from Neelambur to Madukkarai on NH 47 which intersects the Trichy Road at Chintamani Pudur near Irugur and Eachanari in Pollachi Road. In 2012, the Coimbatore Corporation started construction of six railway overpass bridges in the city and the National Highways Authority of India invited feasibility studies to upgrade the National Highway connecting Pollachi and Bannari passing through the city.

=== Public transport ===
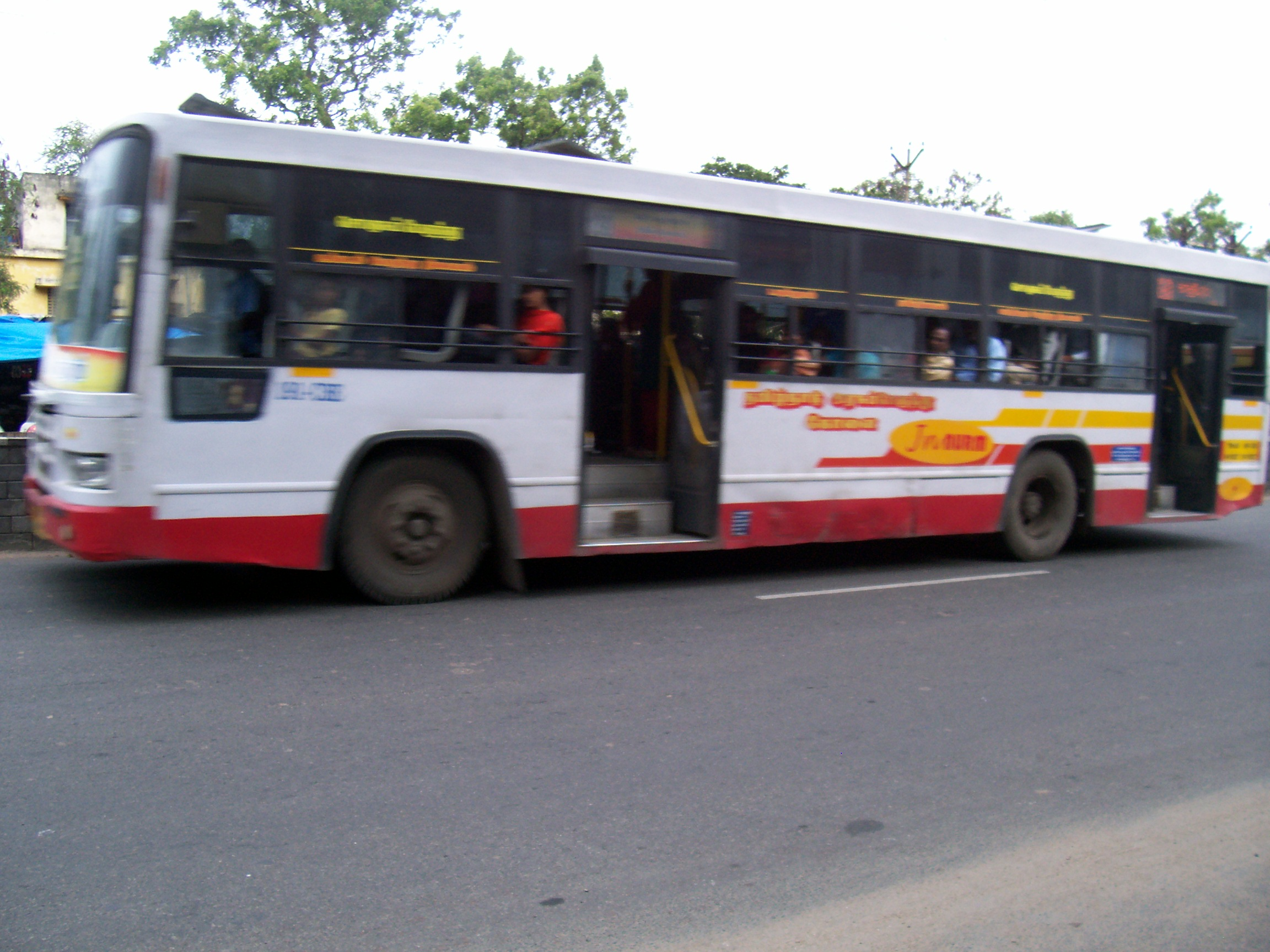
Low floor bus from JNNURM for Coimbatore city

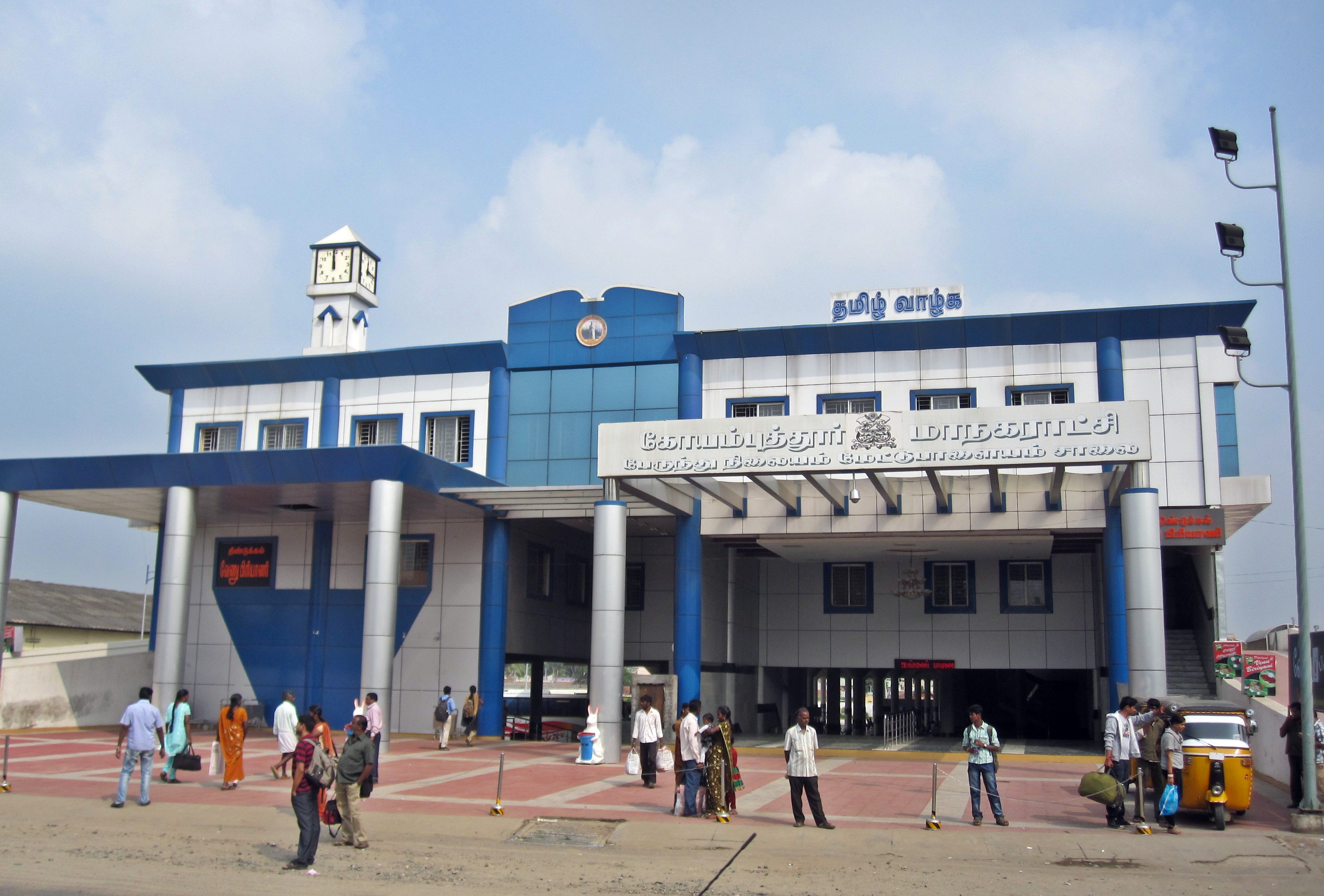
MTP road bus station, all northbound buses towards Ooty, Gudalur and beyond start from here

Most of Coimbatore's intra-city transport requirements are met by extensive public transport, with about 1257 buses on 322 routes. This service, which is run by the government-owned TNSTC Coimbatore covers the city and its suburbs. An additional 500 buses operate on 119 inter-city routes, to major towns in Tamil Nadu, Kerala, Karnataka, Pondicherry, and Andhra Pradesh. Bus services are generally considered efficient; in 2018, TNSTC rolled out conductor-less buses and point-to-point routes to decrease operational costs and improve efficiency. The point-to-point routes were still in effect in April 2023. In 2022, the Petroleum Conservation Research Association ranked TNSTC's Coimbatore division the second most efficient in mileage nationally. A TNSTC official cited "counseling and training programmes for the drivers, periodical servicing of buses and better road conditions" as main factors in improving transport efficiency.

=== Private transport ===
The city is also served by a large number of private buses and auto rickshaws. Call taxis are also becoming more popular and fixed-rate tourist taxis are available at the airport, bus terminals, and railway stations. Vans which are run like bus services are popularly called "maxi cabs". The outlying suburban areas of the city are served by private minibus company services and public buses of neighboring districts. The city has a very high vehicle-to-population ratio. Despite a sharp increase in the number of four-wheelers in the city, motorscooters are still very prevalent, due to their affordability, fuel efficiency, maneuverability, and ease of parking.

=== List of Intercity (Mofussil, Omni, SECTC, Town) bus stands ===
- Gandhipuram Central Bus Terminus
- Gandhipuram Thiruvalluvar bus stand (For SETC (TNSTC) and KSRTC Buses)
- Coimbatore Omni Bus Terminus(Near G.P. Signal)
- Singanallur Bus Terminus
- Saibaba Colony Bus Terminus (Near Saibaba Temple)
- Ukkadam Bus Terminus (Ukkadam)

=== List of Intracity bus stands ===
- Gandhipuram Town Bus stand
- Vadavalli Bus Terminus
- Vellalore Bus Terminus
- Singanallur Bus Stand
- Ondipudur Bus Terminus
- Marudhamalai bus Terminus
- Ukkadam Bus stand
- SaiBaba colony bus stand

=== List of TNSTC Coimbatore depots ===
- Head-Office Branch (City & Moffusil)
- Uppilipalayam (Moffusil only)
- Sungam - 1 (City & Moffusil)
- Sungam - 2 (City only)
- Ukkadam - 1 (City & Moffusil)
- Ukkadam - 2 (City & Moffusil)
- Ondiputhur - 1 (City only)
- Ondiputhur - 2 (Moffusil only)
- Ondiputhur - 3 ( City & Moffusil)
- Annur
- Karumathampati (City only)
- Marudhamalai (City only)
- Pollachi - 1
- Pollachi - 2
- Pollachi - 3

== Air ==
Coimbatore International Airport (IATA: CJB, ICAO: VOCB) is a major airport serving Coimbatore and its suburbs. It is the second busiest airport in Tamil Nadu after Chennai and has separate domestic and international terminals. The airport lies about 12 kilometres (7.5 mi) from the city centre and is accessible by road and rail. As of 2025, the airport is undergoing modernization, including the construction of a new terminal and a runway expansion to 3,800 metres (12,500 ft), which will make it the second longest runway in South India. Other airports in the metropolitan area include Sulur Air Force Station.

== Railways ==
Coimbatore Junction, also known as Kovai Junction, is the primary railway station serving the city, as well as the major rail junction of South India. It has six platforms and is the second busiest railway station in Tamil Nadu, after Chennai. Many trains from Kerala to other parts of the country pass through Coimbatore Junction. It is one of the top booking stations and revenue-generating stations in India according to Indian Railway.

== Proposed rapid transit ==
=== Metro ===
Coimbatore Metro, also known as Kovai Metro or CMRL, is a proposed metro rail system. The plan was shelved in 2011 in favor of a monorail system. In January 2017, a Coimbatore District Administration official told The Hindu that there was no mass rapid transit system presently under consideration for the city. Railway Minister Suresh Prabu announced a plan to construct metro rail in late 2017 on behalf of the government. The proposed works were anticipated to begin by fiscal year 2017–18. A project plan prepared by CMRL was completed in 2022 and the system is expected to finished by 2027. ₹9,000 was allotted for the rail route in the 2023-24 budget.

=== Suburban railway ===
Coimbatore railways have unique infrastructure to host a circular rail system as it has similar bus services within the city limits. One proposal would link Coimbatore, Coimbatore North, Peelamedu, Irugur, and Podanur before returning to Coimbatore Junction. Another infrastructure that can be utilized are the four radiating rail routes from Coimbatore Junction to towns 40 kilometres (25 mi) away. The other junctions are located at Coimbatore North Junction (2.6 km away from Coimbatore Junction (CBE) on the northern side), Podanur Junction (5.8 km away from CBE on the southern side) and Irugur (16 km from CBE on eastern side).

=== Bus rapid transit ===
The Coimbatore Bus Rapid Transit System (BRTS) was proposed under the JNNURM scheme and called for a 18.6-kilometre (11.6 mi) corridor starting at Avinashi Road and ending at Mettupalayam Road. The route would turn left from Stanes School after Avinashi Road and passes along Dr. Nanjappa Road. It then joins at Dr. Rajendra Prasad Road. Avinashi Road, Dr. Rajendra Prasad Road, and Mettupalyam Road would have dedicated two-lane 7-metre (23 ft) carriageways for the BRTS and would be flanked by dual lanes for mixed traffic on either side. These lanes would be separated by 250-millimetre-wide (9.8 in) cement blocks on both sides. A 2-metre (6 ft 7 in) cycle track and 2-metre footpath was proposed on either side of the mixed traffic lane, also separated by cement blocks. The proposal included the addition of 14 at-grade bus stops and three bus stops in the route's 6.87 km (4.27 mi) elevated section. A May 2015 feasibility study by the Institute for Transportation and Development Policy and Tamil Nadu's Transport Department & Commissionerate of Municipal Administration indicated that bus transportation was inadequate to serve the city's needs. At a January 2023 meeting, Coimbatore central regional transport officer K. Sathyakumar suggested the implementation of a BRTS as soon as possible, pointing to Mettupalayam, Trichy, and Avinashi roads as good sites.

== See also ==
- Coimbatore Bus Rapid Transit System
- Coimbatore Bypass
- Coimbatore International Airport
- Coimbatore Junction
- Coimbatore North Junction
- Transport in Chennai
- Transport in India
- Coimbatore Metro
