= Selvapuram =

Coimbatore, Tamil Nadu, India

- Neighbourhood
- Location in Tamil Nadu, IndiaIndial
- Coordinates: 10.993310°N 76.938850°E
- Country: India
- State: Tamil Nadu
- District: Coimbatore
- Metro: Coimbatore
- Zone: Coimbatore Central

Area
  - Total: 3.47 km^{2} (1.34 sq mi)
- Elevation: 411 m (1,348 ft)

Languages
  - Official: Tamil
- Time zone: UTC+5:30 (IST)
- PIN: 641008
- Telephone code: 91–422
- Vehicle registration: TN-66
- Lok Sabha constituency: Coimbatore
- Vidhan Sabha constituency: Thondamuthur

Selvapuram is a major residential locality of the city of Coimbatore in Tamil Nadu, India. It is located on the banks of Noyyal river, which runs to the northwestern boundary of the locality. It is situated in the northwestern part of the city, and is a major residential and industrial locality in the city. It is one of the well developed neighborhoods in the city and has been part of Coimbatore Corporation since 1866.

== History ==
The locality of "Selvapuram" was previously known as "Pallapalayam". Later it was changed as "Selvapuram" with the name inspired from the nearby "Selva Chinthamani Kulam". It is a part of Coimbatore Municipal Corporation since 1866. It is now part of the south zone of the city.

== Geography ==
Selvapuram is located at a distance of 2.8 km (1.7 mi) from the centre of the city, Townhall. The nerve centre of Selvapuram is Siruvani Road. The other major arterial roads are Ponnaiyarajapuram Road, Ukkadam Bypass Road connecting Selvapuram with Ukkadam, Sundakamuthur Bypass Road and Vadavlli Road. Selvapuram shares its border with Perur to the west, Ukkadam to the south, Townhall to the east and Ponnaiyarajapuram to the north. It is located about 14.1 km (8.8 mi) from the Coimbatore International Airport and about 3.5 km (2.2 mi) from City railway station, 7.1 km (4.4 mi) from Gandhipuram Central Bus Terminus, 3.6 km from Ukkadam Bus Terminus, 11.3 km (7.0 mi) from Singanallur Bus Terminus and 8 km (5.0 mi) from Podanur railway station and is well connected to local bus services to various parts of the city. It shares its border with Townhall, Perur, Chokkampudur, Ukkadam, Ponnaiyarajapuram and Telugupalayam.

== Locality ==
=== Restaurants ===
- Milan Hotel
- Thirumalai tiffin
- Hotel Chola
- Maran's Homemade biriyani

=== Hospitals ===
- Snekaram Multi Speciality Hospital
- R.R. Hospital
- Rani hospital
- Selvapuram Urban Primary Health Centre

=== Schools ===
- Shirushti Vidhyalaya Matric Hr.Sec.School
- Balavikash School
- Milton Matric School
- Sri Sowdeswari Vidyalaya Matric. Hr. Sec. School

== Transport ==
Selvapuram has easy access to :

- Gandhipuram : Via Raja Street, Oppanakkara Street, Mill Road and Nanjappa Road
- Coimbatore Integrated Bus Terminus : Via Ukkadam Bypass Road, Podanur Road and Chettipalayam Road
- Ukkadam : Via Ukkadam Bypass Road
- Railway Station : Via Ukkadam Bypass Road and Kottaimedu Road
- Coimbatore International Airport : Via Ukkadam Bypass Road, Sungam Bypass Road, Redfilelds Road and Eastern Avinashi Road

=== Coimbatore Metro ===
Coimbatore Metro feasibility study is completed and one of the route planned from Karunya Nagar to Ganeshapuram via Perur, Gandhipuram Central Bus Terminus, Saravanampatti covering 44 km (27 mi).

== TANGEDCO Sub-Power Station ==
The Tamil Nadu Generation and Distribution Corporation (Tangedco) is enhancing energy infrastructure in the district by establishing new sub-stations and enhancing capacities at many of the existing one at Selvapuram.

== Politics ==
Selvapuram is a part of Thondamuthur Assembly constituency and Pollachi (Lok Sabha constituency).
