= Coimbatore Integrated Bus Terminus =

Planned bus terminus in Tamil Nadu, India

Coimbatore Integrated Bus Terminus கோயம்புத்தூர் ஒருங்கிணைந்த பேருந்து நிலையம்

General information
- Location: Chettipalayam Road, Podanur, Vellalore (Post) Coimbatore; Tamil Nadu-641023
- Coordinates: 10.9531°N 76.9971°E
- System: TNSTC Bus Terminus, SETC Bus Terminus and Tamil Nadu State Transport Corporation Town Bus Terminus]]
- Owner: Coimbatore City Municipal Corporation
- Operator: Department of Transport (Tamil Nadu)
- Platforms: 253
- Connections: Coimbatore Metro, Tamil Nadu State Transport Corporation

Construction
- Parking: Yes
- Cycle facilities: Yes
- Accessible: yes

Other information
- Fare zone: TNSTC Coimbatore Division (191-CBE)

History
- Opened: Under Construction

Passengers
- 3,50,000 Expected
Location

The Coimbatore Integrated Bus Terminus, commonly known as the CIBT, is the integrated bus terminus under construction in Podanur on Chettipalayam Road, Coimbatore, Tamil Nadu, India, to serve both intercity and intracity buses. Upon completion, it would be the second largest bus station in the world with an area of 249,400 square metres (61.62 acres).

== Background ==
The bus terminus was planned to reduce traffic congestion in the city by integrating the Gandhipuram Central Bus Terminus, Gandhipuram Thiruvalluvar Bus stand (For SETC), KSRTC Buses (Karnataka) and KSRTC Buses (Kerala), Ukkadam Bus Terminus, Singanallur Bus Terminus, Saibaba Colony Bus Terminus within a single campus. The terminus would come up at Chettipalayam Road at Vellalore at a site of 249,000 square metres (61.6 acres) area.

== Timeline ==
- 2014 - The Coimbatore Integrated Bus Terminus project was announced by former Chief Minister J. Jayalalithaa.
- 2020 - The foundation stone was laid on 22 February. The proposed terminus will be built at a cost of ₹ 168 crores.
- 2020 - The CMRL proposed to connect CIBT and Ukkadam Bus Terminus by the corridor-V of Coimbatore Metro

== Inclusion of Battery-based buses in CIBT ==
In the project, special battery charging points and maintenance sheds for battery-based buses are included.

== Facilities ==
The size of the land earmarked for the project is 61 acres. The proposed terminus will have the following facilities:

- 140 bus bays
- 33 town bus bays
- 112 idle parking bays
- 80 omni bus bays
- Mother's room
- Medical centre
- Clinic,
- Store room
- Cloak room
- 11 ATM's
- 71 shops
- seven offices for transport corporations
- 20 ticket counters, 3 transport offices and 3 time offices
- 2 restaurants over 405 square meters
- 2 dormitories
- 3 commercial office spaces
- The parking will have 110 four wheeler parking slots and 1200 two wheeler parking slots.
- TNSTC Coimbatore, Tiruppur Head Office

=== Planning Phase-1 ===
The phase 1 will include the construction of Mofussil, SETC and City bus terminals.

=== Planning Phase-2 ===
The phase 2 will include the construction of Omni bus terminal.

== Connections ==
The terminus is connected to all the major places within the city such as:

- Town Hall - 4.2 km
- Gandhipuram Central Bus Terminus - 12.8 km
- Singanallur Bus Terminus - 11.1 km
- Ukkadam Bus Terminus - 8.8 km
- Coimbatore Junction - 10.1 km
- Podanur Junction - 2.9 km
- Coimbatore International Airport - 15.6 km
- TIDEL Park - 13.8 km
- Coimbatore North Junction - 14.2 km
- Peelamedu - 14.2 km
- Singanallur - 11.3 km
- Irugur Junction - 11.8 km

== Metro ==
The proposal of the Coimbatore Metro Corridor-V has been proposed to connect Ukkadam Bus Terminus with CIBT via Podanur Junction.

== See also ==
- Gandhipuram Central Bus Terminus
- Ukkadam Bus Terminus
- Singanallur Bus Terminus
- Saibaba Colony Bus Terminus
- Gandhipuram Town Bus stand
- Coimbatore Omni Bus Terminus
- Transport in Coimbatore
