= Coimbatore Omni Bus Terminus =

Bus terminus in Coimbatore, India

Coimbatore Omni Bus Terminus கோயம்புத்தூர் ஆம்னி பேருந்து நிலையம்

General information
- Location: Sathy Road, Gandhipuram, Coimbatore; Tamil Nadu. PIN – 641 012
- Coordinates: 11.030554°N 76.967007°E
- Owner: Coimbatore City Municipal Corporation

Construction
- Parking: Yes
- Cycle facilities: Yes
- Accessible: yes

Other information
- Station code: CBE

History
- Opened: 2006; 20 years ago

Passengers
- 25,000
Location

The Coimbatore Omni Bus Terminus is a bus terminus located in Coimbatore, in close proximity to Gandhipuram Central Bus Terminus catering to outstation private buses. It was inaugurated in June 2006. The Coimbatore Omni Bus Terminus was planned in an area of 4 acres near the G.P.Signal at Sathy Road to act as a hub for omni bus operations in the city.

== Background ==
In 2006, a omni bus terminus was planned by Coimbatore City Municipal Corporation at Sathy Road to cater the private omni buses in Coimbatore.

== Future ==
The Coimbatore City Municipal Corporation has proposed to move the omni bus terminus to the Coimbatore Integrated Bus Terminus at Vellalore.

== See also ==
- Coimbatore Integrated Bus Terminus
- Gandhipuram Central Bus Terminus
- Singanallur Bus Terminus
- Ukkadam Bus Terminus
- Saibaba Colony Bus Terminus
