= Ganapathy, Coimbatore =

Coimbatore, Tamil Nadu, India

Ganapathy
- neighbourhood
- Location in Tamil Nadu, India
- Coordinates: 11.042226°N 76.981588°E
- Country: India
- State: Tamil Nadu
- District: Coimbatore
- Elevation: 411 m (1,348 ft)

Languages
  - Official: Tamil
- Time zone: UTC+5:30 (IST)
- PIN: 641006
- Telephone code: 91-422
- Vehicle registration: TN 38
- Lok Sabha constituency: Coimbatore
- Vidhan Sabha constituency: Coimbatore North

Ganapathy is a residential neighbourhood in the city of Coimbatore in Tamil Nadu, India. It is located in the north-eastern part of the city. This is the most densely populated area within Coimbatore Corporation limits.

== Geography ==
Ganapathy is situated 3.5 km away from Gandhipuram, 6.5 km away from Townhall, 7 km away from Ukkadam, 8 km from Singanallur, 8.5 km from Coimbatore International Airport, and 16 km from Coimbatore Integrated Bus Terminus. The nerve centre of the locality is Sathy Road. Ganapathy shares border with Chinnavedampatti, Gandhipuram, Poosaripalayam, Rathinapuri, Maniyakarampalayam, Peelamedu, Saravanampatti, Vilankurichi and Avarampalayam.

=== Infrastructure ===
Ganapathy is one of the well-connected localities in the city and has many roads linking to various parts of the Coimbatore Metropolitan Area.The various arterial roads in the area are Sathy Road, Avarampalayam Road, FCI Road, Athipalayam Road a Rathinapuri Road. The stretch between Textool Railway flyover to Ganapathy Signal of the Sathy Road is the most congested road in Tamil Nadu.

To decongest the Sathy Road especially in Ganapathy area, the State Highways Department has proposed to develop Peelamedu–Kalapatti-Saravanampatty and Kurumbapalayam Road into a ring road along the banks of Sanganoor stream. According to the Highways sources, the 12-km stretch from SITRA Junction in Peelamedu would run through Kalapatti and join Sathyamangalam Road at Saravanampatti and then it would join Mettuppalayam Road at Thudiyalur. On completion of this stretch, the Ganapathy section of the Sathy Road would have options of diverting through either sides bypassing Gandhipuram.

=== Transport ===
The nearest railway station to Ganapathy is the Coimbatore North Junction where most trains terminating at the Coimbatore Junction has stop to serve the northern localities of the city. All the town buses from Gandhipuram and Ukkadam to the northern suburbs along the Sathy Road pass through Ganapathy. Ganapathy easy access to :

- Gandhipuram : Via Sathy Road
- Airport : Via FCI Road
- Goundampalayam : Via Maniyakarampalayam Road
- Railway Station : Via MG Road Avarampalayam

=== Entertainment ===
The various parks in Ganapathy are:

- Sri Thiruvengadam Nagar Park
- EB Colony Children's Park

== Healthcare ==
There are a number of hospitals operating from Ganapathy:

- VEEYES Dental Care
- Indian Ayurvedic Hospital at Vilankurichi Road

== Real Estate ==
Though Ganapathy area is already densely and over-populated locality with a large number of residential as well as commercial complexes.

=== AFNHB (Air Force Naval Housing Board) Project ===
Surprisingly, AFNHB, a Central Government Organisation for the welfare of Defence Personnel, has also launched their project for constructing apartments for Air Force and Navy personnels, in Ganapathy. First of its kind in Coimbatore, the foundation for the ₹88-crore project to come up on 13-odd acres, was laid by Rear Admiral R. Gaikwad, Director General, AFNHB. The contract for execution of the project has been given to Shapoorji Pallonji and Company Limited. While launching the project, Rear Admiral Gaikwad said it would have 372 dwelling units besides a swimming pool, community centre, and jogging path.

=== Industrial Sector ===
Large number of such industries in BPO sector are operating their offices from Ganapathy, due to easy availability of trained manpower in this area.

== Education ==
=== Major Schools ===
- Corporation High School
- Apex Primary & Nursery School
- United Nursery & Primary School
- Grace Joseph Amala English Medium School
- CMS Matriculation Higher Secondary School
- Kovai Kalaimagal Matriculation Higher Secondary School

=== Important Colleges ===
- J.A.S College
- DA College
- SNR Sons College
- Dr SNS Rajalakshmi College Of Arts And Science
- Sri Siva Nursing College

== Coimbatore Metro ==
Coimbatore Metro feasibility study is completed and one of the metro corridors is being proposed from Ganeshapuram to Karunya Nagar via Ganapathy covering 44 km.

== Worshipping ==
Venugopalaswamy Temple, Ganapathy, is a Vaishnavite temple found on the road that leads to Sanganoor.
