= Gandhipuram Town Bus stand =

Coimbatore Corporation Town bus stand கோயம்புத்தூர் மாநகராட்சி நகர பேருந்து நிலையம்
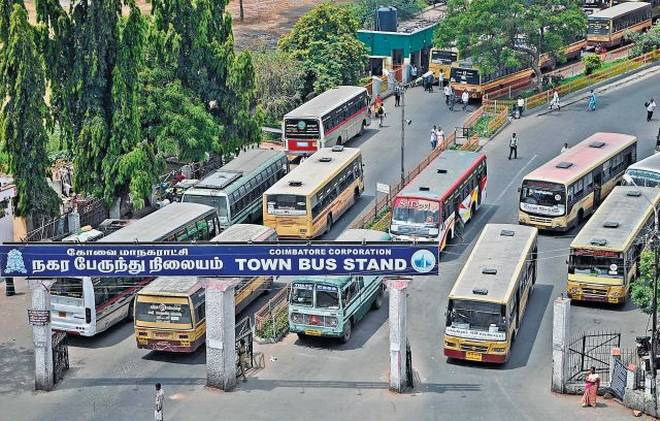

General information
- Location: Gandhipuram, Coimbatore; Tamil Nadu. PIN – 641 012. India
- Coordinates: 11.030554°N 76.967007°E
- Owner: Coimbatore City Municipal Corporation
- Operator: Department of Transport (Tamil Nadu)
- Platforms: 4

Construction
- Parking: Yes
- Cycle facilities: Yes
- Accessible: Disabled access

Other information
- Station code: CBE
- Fare zone: TNSTC Coimbatore Division CBE/191

History
- Opened: 1974; 52 years ago

Passengers
- 70,000 / Per day
Location

The Coimbatore Corporation Town bus stand, commonly known as the Gandhipuram Town BusTerminus, is a hub in Coimbatore for serves intracity buses within the Coimbatore metropolitan area.

== History ==
In Coimbatore, town buses started operating in 1921 to serve most parts of the city, as well as other towns and villages in the district. A town bus terminus was started in 1974 in Gandhipuram.

== Operations ==
Gandhipuram Town Bus Stand serves as the terminus for intra-city buses and operates buses to other major bus termini like the Singanallur Bus Terminus, Ukkadam Bus Terminus, and New Bus stand. Inter-city and intra-city buses that connect Coimbatore operate from various bus stands: the bus stand also operates town buses on 257 intra-city routes.

== Connections ==
The terminus is connected to the Saibaba Colony Bus Terminus, which is about 3.5 kilometres away; the Ukkadam Bus Terminus, which is about 4.5 kilometres away; and the Singanallur Bus Terminus, which is about 10 kilometres away. The Coimbatore Junction railway station is about 3.0 kilometres away and the Coimbatore International Airport is about 9.2 kilometers away.
