= Gandhipuram Central Bus Terminus =

Bus terminal in Coimbatore, Tamil Nadu, India

Gandhipuram Central bus stand காந்திபுரம் பேருந்து நிலையம்
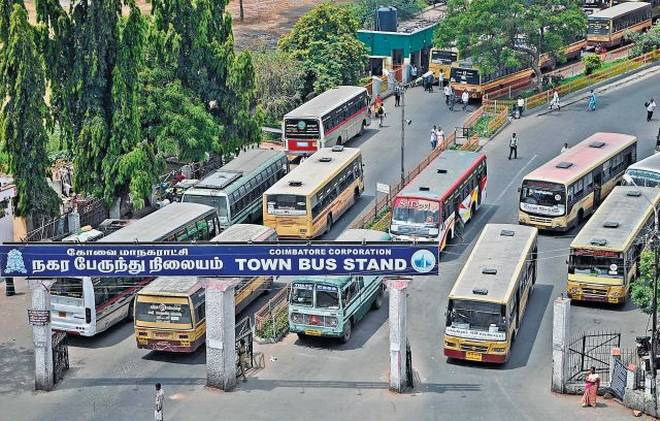

General information
- Location: Gandhipuram, Coimbatore; Tamil Nadu. PIN – 641 012. India
- Coordinates: 11.030554°N 76.967007°E
- Owner: Coimbatore City Municipal Corporation
- Operator: Department of Transport (Tamil Nadu)
- Platforms: 4

Construction
- Parking: Yes
- Cycle facilities: Yes
- Accessible: Disabled access

Other information
- Station code: CBE
- Fare zone: TNSTC Coimbatore Division CBE/191

History
- Opened: 1974; 52 years ago

Passengers
- 70,000 / Per day
Location

The Gandhipuram Central Bus Terminus, commonly known as the Gandhipuram Bus Terminus, is a bus terminus in Coimbatore that serves intercity buses.

== History ==
In Coimbatore, town buses started operating in 1921 to serve most parts of the city, as well as other towns and villages in the district. A central bus terminus was started in 1974 in Gandhipuram. Due to increases in population and vehicular traffic, additional bus terminals were created in Ukkadam, Singanallur and Saibaba Colony. At the current situation, northbound and eastbound buses from the city use this bus terminal. It is located centrally in the city.

== Services ==
Bus service includes inter-city and intra-city buses that connect Coimbatore operate from different bus stands.

Location	Bus Station	Destinations
Gandhipuram	Central	Tiruppur, Erode, Dharapuram, Salem, Karur Kangayam, Gobichettipalayam, Mettur Dam, Sathyamangalam, Mettupalayam
Gandhipuram	SETC	Chennai, Ernakulam, Bangalore, Tirupati, Puducherry, Thiruvananthapuram
Gandhipuram	Omni Bus Stand	Private mofussil buses

=== Gandhipuram Central Bus stand ===
Gandhipuram Central Bus Stand is the bus terminal for northeast-bound and northbound buses towards Salem, Erode, Dharmapuri, Hosur, Namakkal, Gobichettipalayam, Sathyamangalam, Mettupalayam, and Tirupur, and eastbound buses towards Dharapuram and Karur, among others. There are 119 inter-city routes operated by the Coimbatore division with more than 500 buses.

Bay	Bus Route
1	Tiruppur via Palladam
2	Tiruppur via Avinashi
3	Mettupalayam, Karamadai
4	Sathyamangalam, Bannari, Puliampatty
5	Gobichettipalayam, Anthiyur, Perumanallur, Nambiyur
6	Erode, Namakkal, Rasipuram, Tiruchengode, Bhavani
7	Salem, Hosur, Krishnagiri, Dharmapuri
8	Karur, Kangeyam, Dharapuram

=== Thiruvalluvar Bus Stand ===
The Thiruvallavur Bus Stand is located near the Gandhipuram bus terminus and is serviced by SETC, Kerala State Road Transport Corporation, and the Karnataka State Road Transport Corporation.

=== Other Termini ===
Bus Terminus	Location	Destinations
Ukkadam Bus Terminus	Ukkadam	Pollachi, Palakkad, Udumalaipettai, Valparai, Palani
Singanallur Bus Terminus	Singanallur	Dharapuram, Oddanchatram, Madurai, Theni, Tiruchirappalli, Pudukottai, Sivakasi, Thanjavur
Mettupalayam Road Bus Terminus	Sai Baba colony	Ooty, Gudalur, Mysore, Kothagiri, Coonoor

== Connections ==
The terminus is connected to all the major places within the city such as:

- Town Hall - 3.1 km
- Coimbatore Integrated Bus Terminus - 12.8 km
- Ukkadam Bus Terminus - 4.1 km
- Singanallur Bus Terminus - 9.5 km
- Saibaba Colony Bus Terminus - 3.3 km
- Coimbatore Junction - 2.3 km
- Podanur Junction - 9 km
- Coimbatore International Airport - 10.7 km.
