= Podanur-Chettipalayam Road =

Chettipalayam Road
- Maintained by: Highways of Tamil Nadu; Coimbatore City Municipal Corporation
- Length: 8 km (5.0 mi)
- South end: Podanur, Coimbatore
- Major junctions: Kurichi Road/Sundarapuram Road(Podanur); Vellalore Road(GD Hospital); Coimbatore Integrated Bus Terminus; Eachanari Road(Eachanari Pirivu); Coimbatore Bypass(L&T Bypass Road junction); Malumichampatty Road/Kinathukadavu Road/Palladam Road(Chettipalayam Road)
- South end: Chettipalayam, Coimbatore

Chettipalayam Road, SH 162 is an arterial road in the city of Coimbatore, Tamil Nadu, India. This road connects the city with the Coimbatore Integrated Bus Terminus and Podanur Junction. It is a four lane road from Podanur to Chettipalayam.

== Flyovers ==
In Chettipalayam Road, the Podanur flyover was opened in 2018 to reduce traffic congestion by the railway crossing in the Podanur-Palakkad railway line.

A grade separator has been planned at the L&T Bypass Road junction to facilitate the vehicle movement towards the Coimbatore Integrated Bus Terminus.

== Railway stations along Chettipalayam Road ==
- Podanur Junction railway station
- Chettipalayam (defunct)

== Bus Terminals along Chettipalayam Road ==
- Coimbatore Integrated Bus Terminus

== Places transversed ==
- Podanur Junction railway station
- Kanjikonampalayam Pirivu
- Coimbatore Integrated Bus Terminus
- Eachanari Pirivu
- L&T Bypass Junction
- Chettipalayam

== Major Landmarks on Chettipalayam Road ==
- Podanur Junction railway station
- Coimbatore Integrated Bus Terminus
- Shri Aishwaryam Smart City

== Educational institutions ==
- GD Hospital

== Coimbatore Metro ==
The Coimbatore Metro feasibility study has been completed and one of the corridors has been planned from Ukkadam Bus Terminus to Coimbatore Integrated Bus Terminus covering 10 km.
