= Ram Nagar, Coimbatore =

Coimbatore, Coimbatore, India

Ram Nagar is Located in Central Coimbatore. It is located between Gandhipuram, Tatabad, Grey Town and RS Puram.... Famous women's association WOBEDA. is operated from here. The RASHTRIYA SWAYAMSEWAK SANGH Office is also located in Ramnagar.

== Localities ==
The Specialty of this area is all the street names hold the name of leaders of India. Following are the roads in Ram Nagar. North-South Roads:

- Patel Road
- Vivekanandha Road
- Rajaji Road (Kannan Departmental Stores, Shri Krishna Sweets, Suburban Schools are Located here)
- Gokale Road
- Kalingarayan Road (XIC-Xplore It Corp), (.IT/ITES Training provider), Srinivaspuram Market, Banana Slice, ABT X Offices
- Sengupta street (Appin Coimbatore)

East-West Roads:

- Ansari Street
- Sengupta Street
- Sarojini Street
- Sastri Road
- Kalidas Road
- Sathyamoorthy Road (Ayyappan pooja sangham)
- Nehru Road
- Swarnambika Layout

List of Hotels in Ramnagar area:

- Hotel Srri Aswini Deluxe (3 star)
- Hotel Aswini Lodge
- Hotel KK Residency
- Avinashi Suites
- Prince Garden
- Vijay Park Inn
- Hotel City Tower (2 star)
- Heritage Inn (3 star)
- Hotel Alankar Grandé (3 star)
- Velan Food Park
- Hotel Mangala International
- Junior kuppana
- Hotel sigadi
