= Perur =

Coimbatore, Tamil Nadu, India

- Neighbourhood
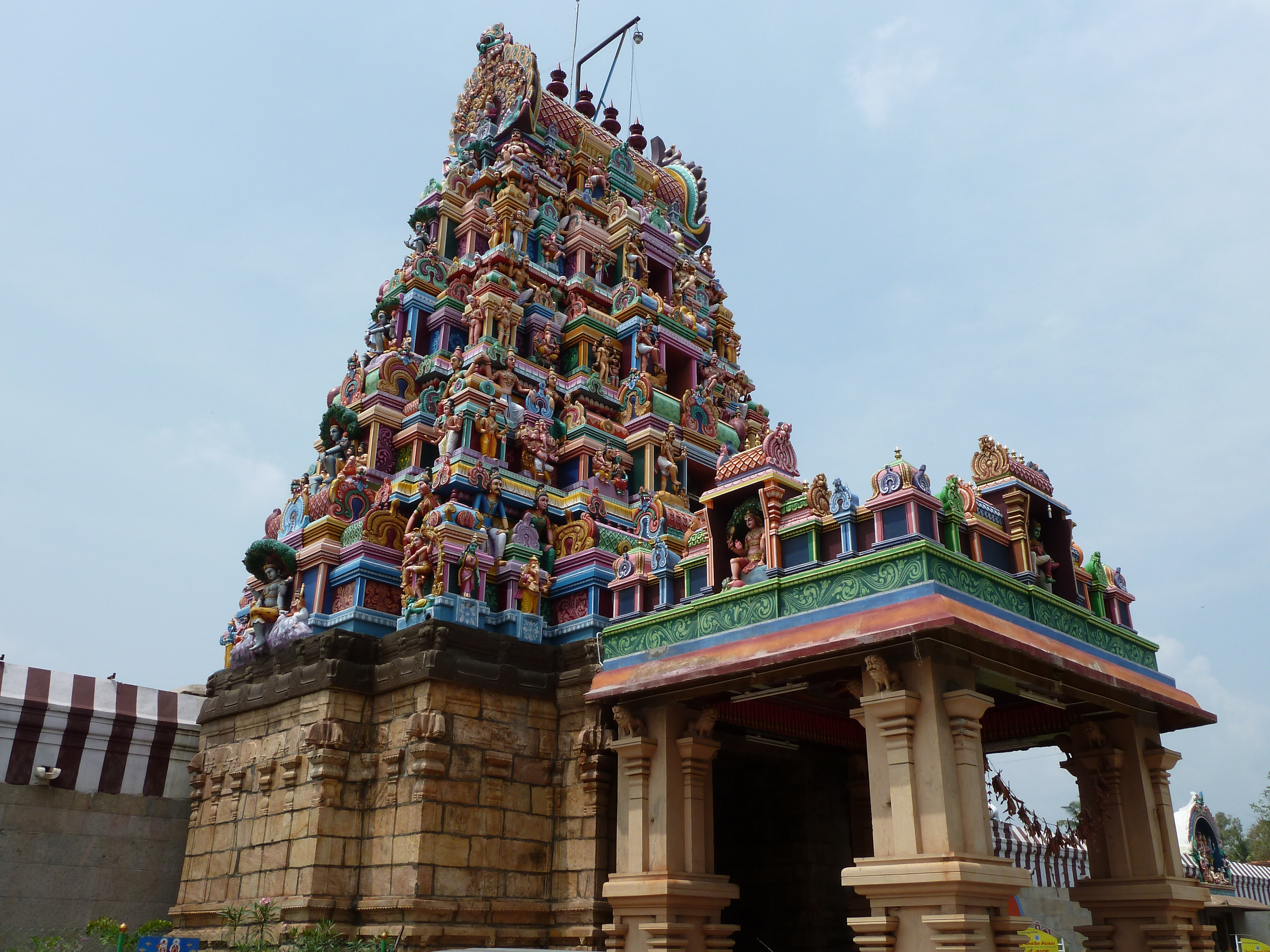
- " Pateeswarar Temple Rajagopuram "

- Location in Tamil Nadu, IndiaIndial
- Coordinates: 10.97°N 76.9°E
- Country: India
- State: Tamil Nadu
- District: Coimbatore
- Metro: Coimbatore

Area
  - Total: 7 km^{2} (2.7 sq mi)
- Elevation: 418 m (1,371 ft)

Population (2011)
  - Total: 8,100
  - Density: 1,200/km^{2} (3,000/sq mi)

Languages
  - Official: Tamil
- Time zone: UTC+5:30 (IST)
- PIN: 641010
- Telephone code: 91–422
- Vehicle registration: TN-99
- Lok Sabha constituency: Pollachi
- Vidhan Sabha constituency: Thondamuthur

Perur is a major residential neighbourhood and cultural hub of the city of Coimbatore in Tamil Nadu, India. It is located on the banks of Noyyal River, which divides the settlement into equal halves.

== History ==
Perur is a historical town that is located six km (3.7 mi) west of Coimbatore that lies on the bank of the Noyyal River. Noyyal is historically called as Kanchi and Kanchima nadhi by different derivations. The Archaeological survey of India under the guidance of K.V. Soundararajan and B. Narashimaiha excavated this site in 1970-71 and observed three cultural periods without any break. Perur had been a prominent trading hub and had trade relations with Rome, since it was a part of historic "Rajasekaraperuvazhi" and the capital of Perur Nadu in the erstwhile Chera, Chola and Pandya kingdoms. The settlement is famous for Perur Pateeswarar Temple built by the Chola emperor Karikala Chola in 2 AD.

== Etymology ==
As per Tolkappiyam, in the sangam landscape the larger settlements along fertile river basins in Marutham landscape were termed as "Perur". According to Senthandivakaram any place which has more than 500 families will be considered as Perur.

== Geography ==
Perur is located at 5 km from the centre of the city, Townhall. The nerve centre of Perur is Siruvani Road. Other majors roads are Vedapatti Road, Maruthamalai Road and Chettipalayam Road. Perur shares its borders with Selvapuram, Telugupalayam, Perur Chettipalayam and Vedapatti.

=== Perur-Sundakamuthur lake ===
Researchers studying Perur-Sundakamuthur lake have linked the significant decline in waterbird populations to three primary anthropogenic drivers: sand mining activities within or near the lake, intensified commercial fishing, and road expansion that has physically encroached into the wetland. Despite the lake remaining relatively unpolluted—with an absence of industrial effluents and the invasive water hyacinth (Eichhornia crassipes)—the combination of physical encroachment and intensified human activity has substantially disrupted the ecological balance. These findings underscore how structural modifications and human disturbance, rather than water quality degradation alone, can be decisive drivers of wildlife decline in urban wetlands.

== Administration ==
Perur is currently administered by Perur Town Panchayat. It is the headquarters of Perur taluk and Perur Panchayat Union in Coimbatore district.

== Demographics ==
As of 2001 India census, Perur had a population of 7937. Males constitute 50% of the population and females 50%. Perur has an average literacy rate of 69%, higher than the national average of 59.5%: male literacy is 76%, and female literacy is 61%. In Perur, 10% of the population is under 6 years of age.

As of 2011 India census, the population had risen to 8004.

== Religious importance ==
Perur is famous for its ancient Perur Pateeswarar Temple. Other than this temple there are numerous other temples and many wedding halls. Just 500 m away from the main temple is the bank of Noyyal River. People arrive here round the year to perform the rituals of deceased people since ancient times.

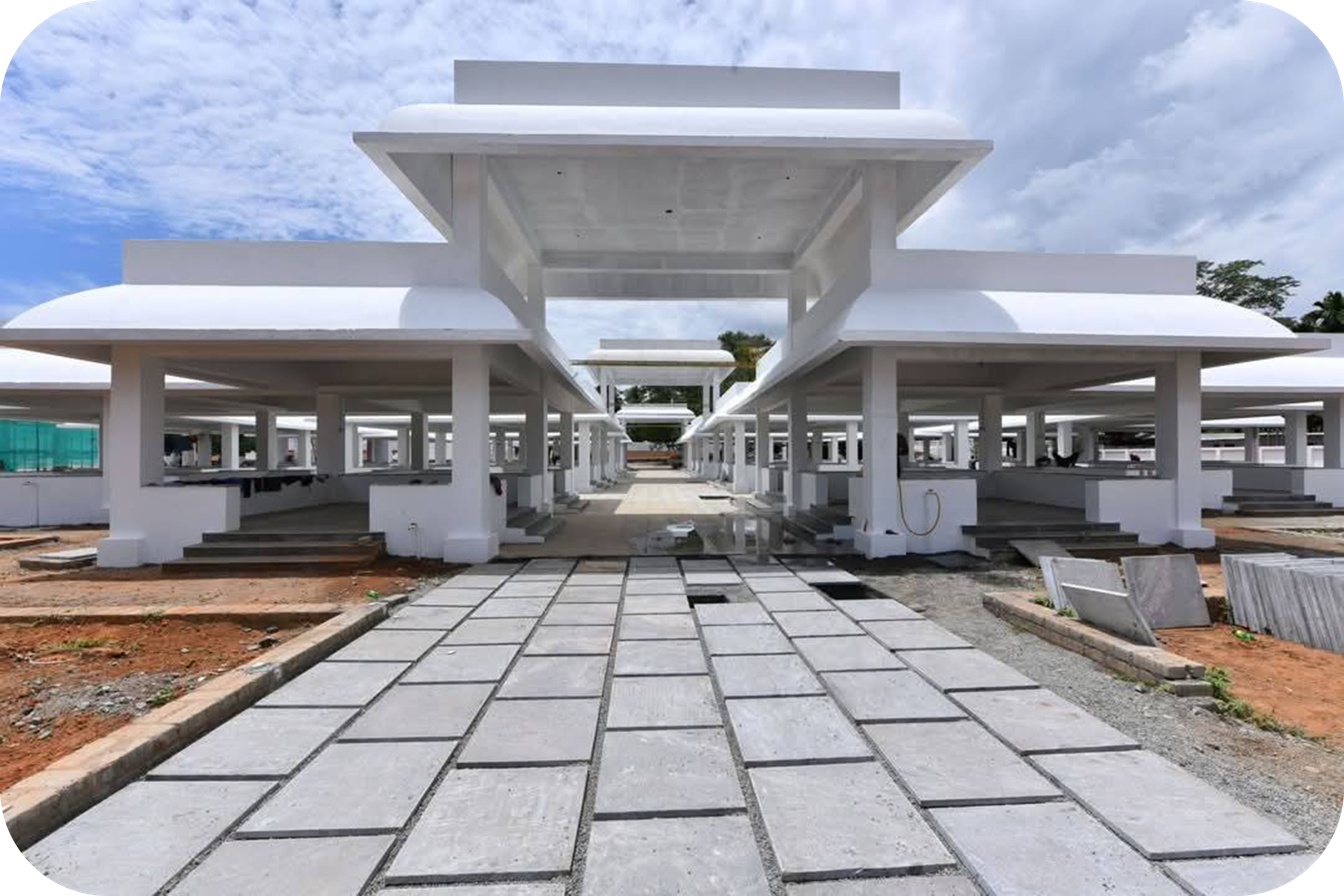
Entrance view - Tharpana mandapams at Perur padithurai

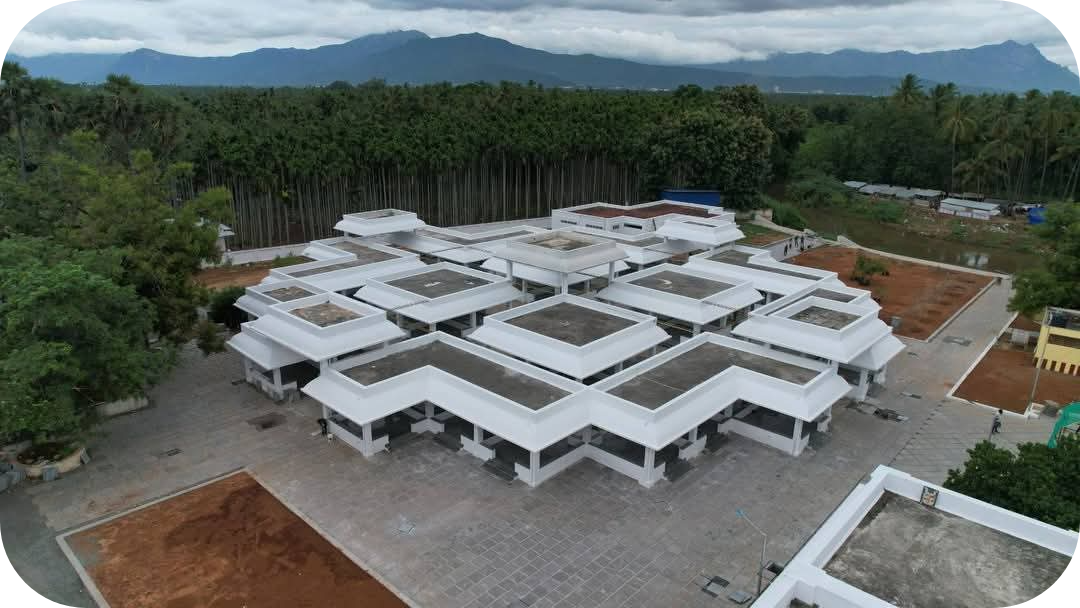
Eagle eye view -Tharpana mandapams at Perur padithurai

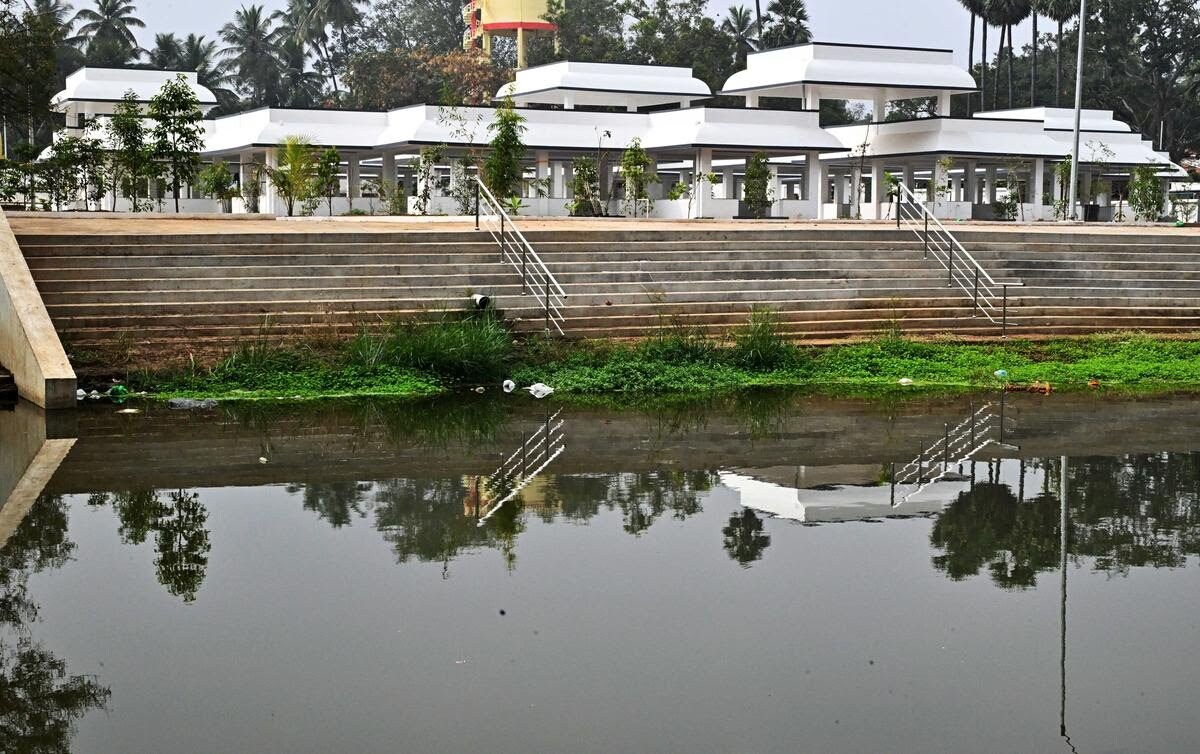
Perur lake with Tharpana mandapams at Perur padithurai

Tharpana mandapams were constructed at Perur Padithurai waiting hall, 50 tharpana mandapams, navagraha pillars, waiting hall, parking lots and toilets built at a cost of ₹12 to 15 crore inaugurated on February 10,2025

== Economy ==
The area is mostly agricultural. Predominantly cash crops like coconut, banana is grown in Perur in the fertile Noyyal river basin.

== Perur Lake ==
One of the prominent lakes in the Noyyal river system built by Karikala Chola, the Perur lake is located here.

== Coimbatore Metro ==
Coimbatore Metro feasibility study is completed and one of the route planned from Ganeshapuram to Karunya Nagar via Ukkadam Bus Terminus and Perur covering 44 km.

== Politics ==
Perur assembly constituency is part of Thondamuthur (state assembly constituency) and Pollachi (Lok Sabha constituency) since the delimination exercise in 2009.

== See also ==
- Coimbatore district
- List of temples in Tamil Nadu
- Noyyal River
- Karikala chola
