= Saibaba Colony Bus Terminus =

Bus station in Coimbatore, Tamil Nadu, India

New Bus Stand புதிய பேருந்து நிலையம்
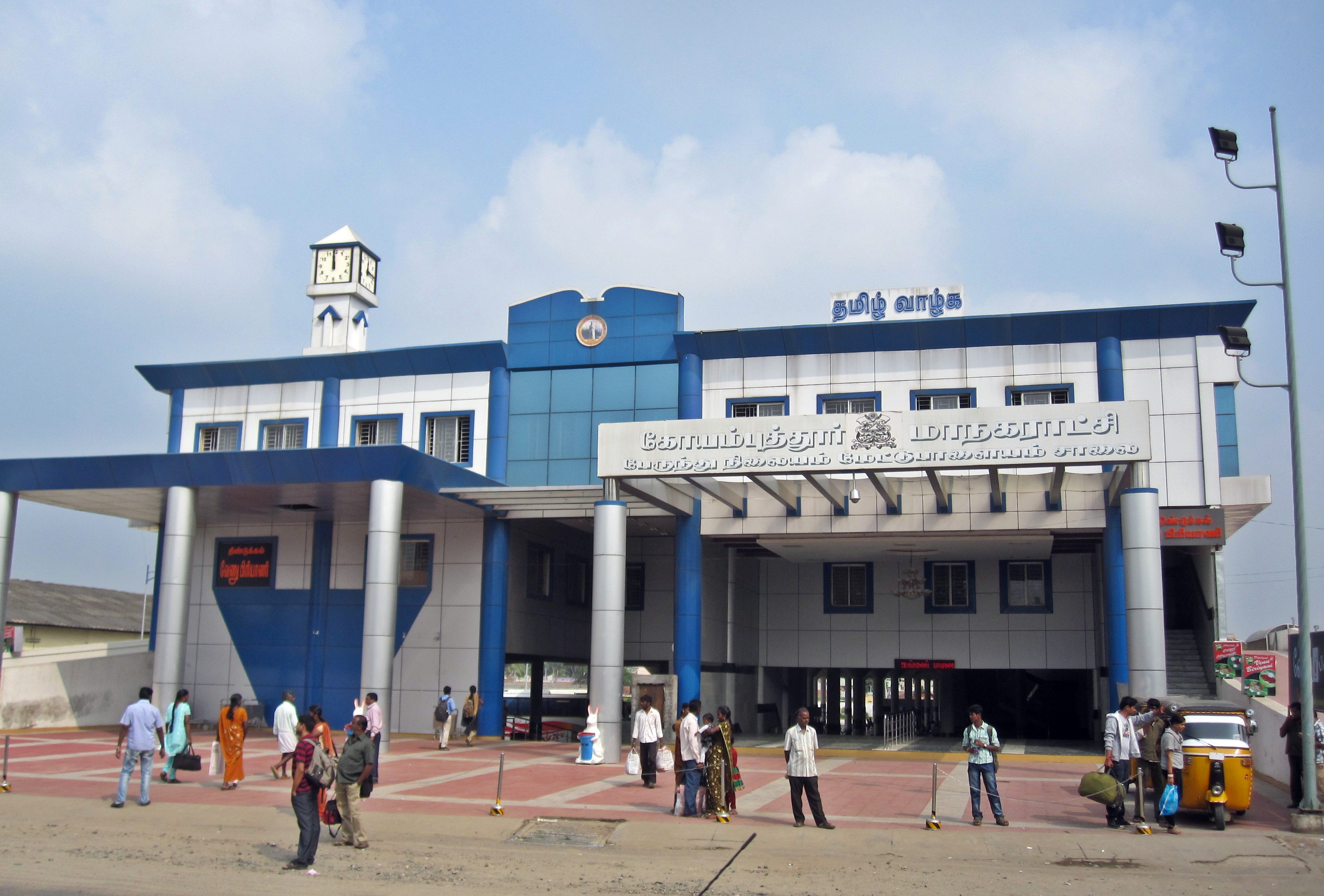

General information
- Location: Mettupalayam Road, Coimbatore; Tamil Nadu. PIN – 641 034. India
- Coordinates: 11.030554°N 76.951178°E
- Owner: Coimbatore City Municipal Corporation
- Operator: Department of Transport (Tamil Nadu)
- Platforms: 4

Construction
- Parking: Yes
- Cycle facilities: Yes
- Accessible: Disabled access

Other information
- Station code: CBE
- Fare zone: TNSTC Coimbatore Division CBE/191

History
- Opened: 2010; 16 years ago

Passengers
- 10,000 / Per day
Location

New Bus Stand popularly known as Pudhu Bus Stand or Saibaba Colony Bus Terminus or Mettupalayam Road Bus Terminus, is one of the bus terminus of Coimbatore City.

== History ==
The New Bus Stand on Mettupalayam Road, Opposite to CTC Depot, was opened in 2010. This bus stand is intended to act as an originating bus stand for buses plying from Coimbatore to destinations to the north of the city, namely, Ooty, Mettupalayam, Coonoor, Gudalur, etc.

== Route ==
Location	Bus Station	Destinations
Mettupalayam Road	Coimbatore North	Mettupalayam, Ooty, Gudalur, Coonoor, Piloor Dam and Mysore

=== Destinations ===
- Mettupalayam
- Coonoor (via Mettupalayam)
- Ooty (via Coonoor)
- Gudalur (via Ooty)
- Kothagiri (via Mettuppalayam)
- KSRTC Mangaluru

== Connections ==
The terminus is connected to all the major places within the city such as:

- Town Hall - 4.2 km
- Coimbatore Integrated Bus Terminus - 13.6 km
- Gandhipuram Central Bus Terminus - 3.3 km
- Singanallur Bus Terminus - 11.4 km
- Ukkadam Bus Terminus - 5.0 km
- Coimbatore Junction - 3.8 km
- Podanur Junction - 9.4 km
- Coimbatore International Airport - 12.4 km.
