= Sivananda Colony =

Coimbatore, Tamil Nadu, India

- neighbourhood
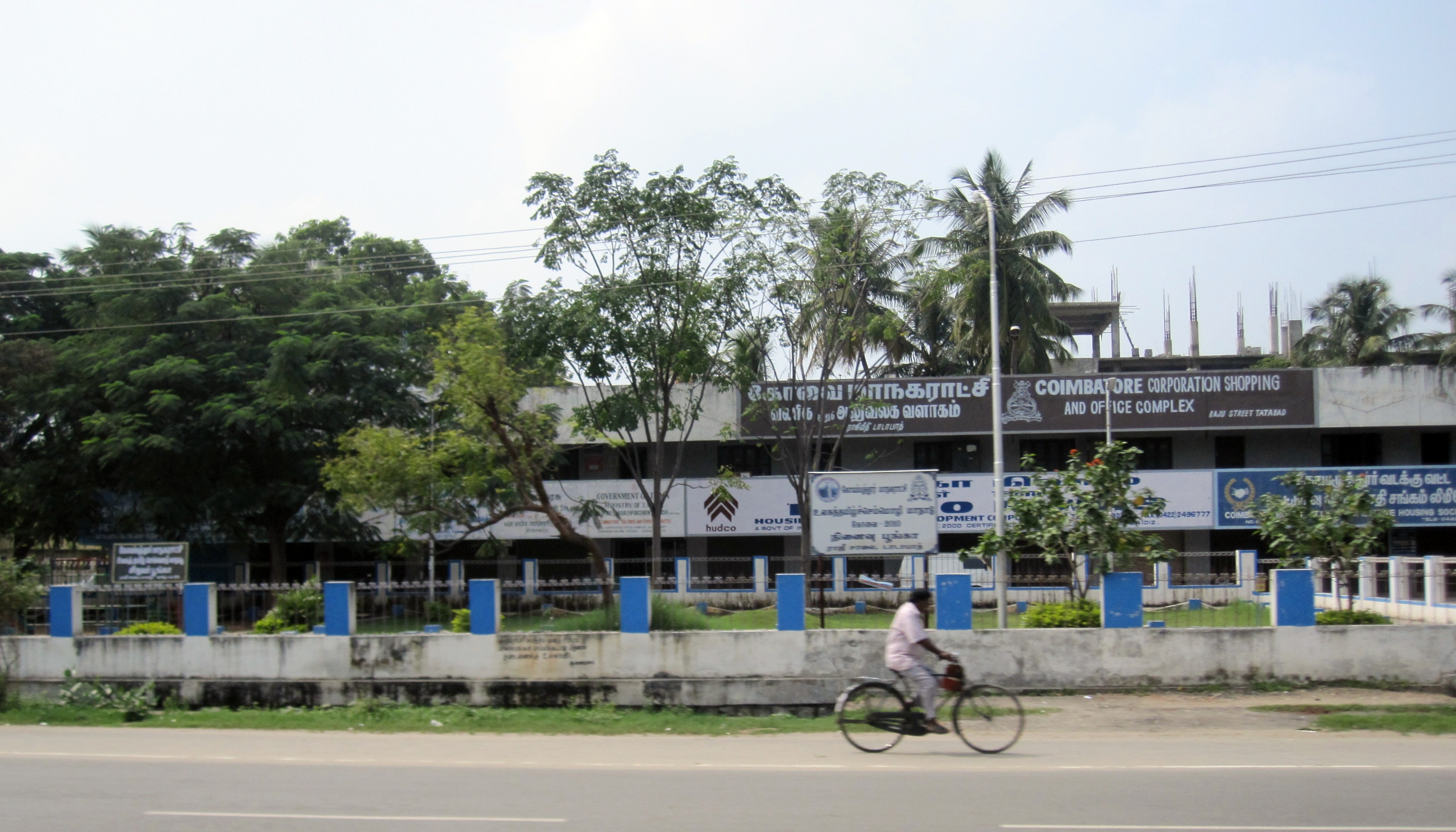
- Corporatation Shopping Complex, Sivanandha Colony
- Interactive map of Sivananda Colony
- Coordinates: 11°1′23″N 76°57′25″E
- Country: India
- State: Tamil Nadu
- District: Coimbatore

Population
  - Total: 45,243

Languages
  - Official: Tamil
- Time zone: UTC+5:30 (IST)
- PIN: 641012
- Telephone code: 0422
- Vehicle registration: TN-66

Sivananda Colony is a neighborhood and suburb in Coimbatore, India. Sivanandha colony shares its border with Tatabad, R. S. Puram, Rathinapuri, and Goundampalayam.
