= Saibaba Colony =

Coimbatore, Tamil Nadu, India

- Neighbourhood
- Location in Tamil Nadu, India
- Coordinates: 11.21°N 76.95°E
- Country: India
- State: Tamil Nadu
- District: Coimbatore
- Elevation: 412 m (1,352 ft)

Languages
  - Official: Tamil
- Time zone: UTC+5:30 (IST)
- PIN: 641011
- Telephone code: 91-422
- Vehicle registration: TN 38

Saibaba Colony is an area located in Coimbatore, Tamil Nadu, India. The Saibaba Temple is located there, and the name of the area is derived from the temple. The locality is mostly occupied by upper-middle-class people living in Coimbatore. One side is bordered by Thadagam road and the other side by Mettupalayam Road. NSR road in Sai Baba colony is fully occupied by commercial centers.

== Geography ==
Saibaba Colony is situated just 4 km North of the heart of the City Gandhipuram and located between Mettupalayam Road and Thadagam Road. Saibaba Colony shares borders with R.S Puram, Coimbatore North Junction, Tamil Nadu Agricultural University campus and Goundampalayam.

== Population ==
According to India Census 2001, Saibaba Colony has an approximate population of 1,14,000 and considered as one of the most thickly populated area in Coimbatore City.

== General ==
The Saibaba Colony derives its name after a famous Saibaba temple located there. The area is quiet and residential with mostly individual houses. In 2010 the area started booming with apartments thanks to its increasing popularity.

== Banks ==
Most of the public and private sector banks and govt banks are visible here. State Bank of India, South Indian Bank, Federal Bank, City Union Bank, Karur Vysya Bank, Lakshmi Vilas Bank, Indian Bank, Indian Overseas Bank, Union Bank of India, Repco bank, Axis Bank, Kotak Mahindra bank, Bank of Baroda, Bank of India, Central Bank of India, Canara Bank, HDFC Bank, Induslnd Bank, ICICI Bank, Tamil Nadu Grama Bank are some seen in the locality.

== NSR Road ==
NSR Road in Saibaba Colony is famous for its shopping joints and food centers which solves the basic amenities.

== Schools ==
There are various schools located in this locality. Notable schools include Bharathi Matriculation Higher Secondary School, Lisieux Matriculation Higher Secondary School, Avila Convent, Sindhi Vidhyalaya, Angappa Senior Secondary School.

== Entertainment ==
It has a municipal park for children built by the Coimbatore City Municipal Corporation. Saibaba Colony is also home to the Bharathi Park and many other well maintained parks which provide good facilities for morning walkers and jogging enthusiasts.
