= Rathinapuri =

Coimbatore, Tamil Nadu, India

- neighbourhood
- Interactive map of Rathinapuri
- Coordinates: 11.026961013065497°N 76.96790976504917°E
- Country: India
- State: Tamil Nadu
- District: Coimbatore
- Founder: Thambi Gounder & Nagarathinam
- Named for: Rathinam(Rathinapuri)

Population
  - Total: 45,243

Languages
  - Official: Tamil
- Time zone: UTC+5:30 (IST)
- PIN: 641027
- Telephone code: 0422
- Vehicle registration: TN 66

Rathinapuri is a residential area in the city of Coimbatore, Tamil Nadu, India. Rathinapuri is bordered by Gandhipuram to the South, Sivananda Colony to the West and Ganapathy to the North and East. The main residential areas are: S.P. Kumarasamy Street, Mariamman Kovil Street, Bagthavachalam street, P.M. Swamy Colony, Arumuga Gounder street, Palani Gounder street, Muthukumar Nagar, Marutha kutty gounder layout, Sampath Street, Kalki Street, Subbiah Gounder Street, Ranganna Gounder Street, Chekkan Thottam, Indra Nagar, Kalki Street, Periyar Street, Nalvar Layout and Kandasamy Street.
