= Venugopalaswamy Temple, Ganapathy =

Hindu temple in Coimbatore district

Religion
- Affiliation: Hinduism
- District: Coimbatore district
- Festivals: Sathyanarayana pooja, Special poojas on Thiruvonam star, Mārgazhi utsav, Vaikunta Ekādasi, SreeRāma Navami, Navrātri, Purattaasi Saturdays, Aadi Friday, Varalakshmi pooja, Aadi Pooram, Anjaneyar Abhishek, Special poojas for Chakkaraththaazhvaar on Chithirai star

Location
- Location: Ganapathy
- State: Tamil Nadu
- Country: India
- Interactive map of Venugopalaswamy Temple, Ganapathy
- Coordinates: 11°02′10.2″N 76°58′34.4″E

Architecture
- Elevation: 444 m (1,457 ft)

Website
- hrce.tn.gov.in

Venugopalaswamy Temple, Ganapathy is a Vaishnavite temple in the neighbourhood viz., Ganapathy, in Coimbatore district in Tamil Nadu of India. The neighbourhood Ganapathy was named so, on the basis of a Ganapathy temple, viz., Kottai Ganapathy which was built 1,000 years ago, in front of this temple.

== Location ==
Under the control of Hindu Religious and Charitable Endowments Department of Government of Tamil Nadu,

== Temple History ==
The King of Mysore, of Yadava heritage, made arrangements to construct this temple, 1,000 years ago. Renovations were made in the year 1764 by King of Madaya Udayar heritage.

== Information on poojas ==
- Ko pooja in between 6:00 a.m. and 06:15 a m.
- Kaalasandhi pooja in between 6:00 a.m. and 7:00 a.m.
- Uchchikkaala pooja in between 12 noon and 12:30 p.m.
