= Singanallur Bus Terminus =

Singanallur bus stand சிங்காநல்லூர் பேருந்து நிலையம்
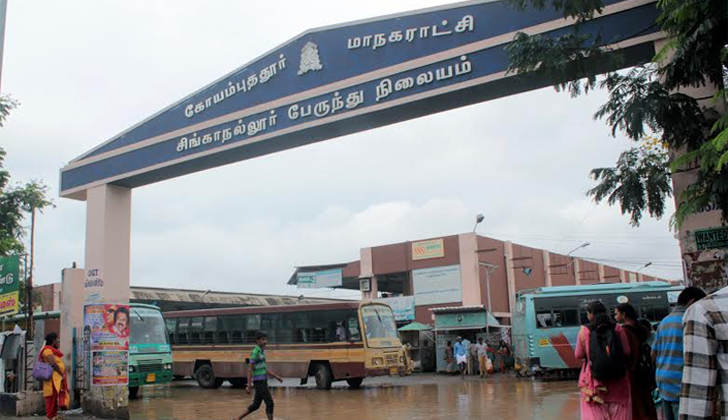

General information
- Location: Kamarajar Road, Singanallur, Coimbatore; Tamil Nadu. PIN – 641 005. India
- Coordinates: 11.030554°N 76.967007°E
- Owner: Coimbatore City Municipal Corporation
- Operator: Department of Transport (Tamil Nadu)
- Platforms: 4

Construction
- Parking: Yes
- Cycle facilities: No
- Accessible: Disabled access

Other information
- Station code: CBE
- Fare zone: TNSTC Coimbatore Division 191-CBE

History
- Opened: 2002; 24 years ago

Passengers
- 20,000 / Per day
Location

Singanallur Bus Terminus is one of the seven bus terminus in the Coimbatore City. It predominantly serves Mofussil buses, although it also serves a few terminating intracity buses.

== History ==
The bus stand was constructed to ease congestion in the Gandhipuram Central Bus Terminus. This bus stand was opened in 2002. It is located at the Southern end of Kamaraj Road and 0.5 km from Trichy Road. Buses plying in eastern direction via Palladam to Trichy, Tanjavur, Madurai, Theni, Dindigul, Rameshwaram, Tirunelveli, Nagercoil etc. from Coimbatore are operated from this bus stand. Buses all time around the time ply from Singanallur to Gandhipuram. This bus terminus is well connected with Ukkadam Bus Terminus and Gandhipuram Bus Terminus. All buses from Singanallur Bus terminus and Ukkadam Bus terminus pass through the Coimbatore Junction. It includes cubicles where mothers can nurse their infants.

== Route ==
Location	Bus Station	Destinations
Singanallur	Singanallur	Ariyalur, Chidambaram, Karaikudi, Karur, Kumbakonam, Madurai, Mannargudi, Mayiladuthurai, Nagapattinam, Nagercoil, Perambalur, Pudukkottai, Rajapalayam, Rameswaram, Sivagangai, Sivakasi, Thanjavur, Theni, Thiruvarur, Thoothukudi, Tirunelveli, Tiruchirappalli, Velankanni

=== Destinations ===
- Madurai (via Dharapuram, Oddanchatram) at every 10 min (day)
- Tiruchirapalli (via Karur) at every 10 min (day)
- Thanjavur (via Trichy)
- Kumbakonam (via Tanjore)
- Sivagangai

(via Dharapuram, Oddanchatram, Madurai) at 12.05pm

- Thirunelveli

(via Dharapuram, Oddanchatram, Madurai, Sattur)

- Rameswaram

(via Dharapuram, Oddanchatram, Madurai, Ramnad)

- Theni

(via Dharapuram Oddanchatram, Bathalagundu)

- Nagercoil (via Dharapuram, Oddanchatram, Madurai, Tirunelveli)

== Connections ==
The terminus is connected to all the major places within the city such as:

- Town Hall - 8.1 km
- Coimbatore Integrated Bus Terminus - 11 km
- Gandhipuram Central Bus Terminus - 9 km
- Ukkadam Bus Terminus - 8.3 km
- Saibaba Colony Bus Terminus - 12 km
- Coimbatore Junction - 7.9 km
- Podanur Junction - 8 km
- Coimbatore International Airport - 7.6 km.

== Facilities ==
Cloak Room, Toilet, Snacks shop, Parking, TV, STD booths.
