= Maniyakarampalayam =

- neighbourhood
- Interactive map of Maniyakarampalayam
- Country: India
- State: Tamil Nadu
- District: Coimbatore

Languages
  - Official: Tamil
- Time zone: UTC+5:30 (IST)

Maniyakaranpalayam is a residential neighbourhood in the city of Coimbatore in Tamil Nadu, India.

== Location ==
Maniyakaranpalayam is a located 10 km from Coimbatore city railway station, Tamil Nadu, India. It comes under 41st ward of the Coimbatore corporation.

== Transportation ==
Maniyakaranpalayam is well connected to other places of Coimbatore by the following bus routes.

- S1 - Maniyakaranpalayam to Ondipudur (Ganapathy, Gandhipuram, Lakshmi Mills, Peelamedu, ESI, Singanallur)
- S9 - Udayampalayam to Ondipudur (Maniyakaranpalayam, Ganapathy, Gandhipuram, Lakshmi Mills, Peelamedu, ESI, Singanallur)
- S10 - Udayampalayam to Ondipudur (Maniyakaranpalayam, Ganapathy, Gandhipuram, Lakshmi Mills, Peelamedu, ESI, Singanallur)
- S9A - Chinnavedampatti to Ondipudur (Udayampalayam, Maniyakaranpalayam, Ganapathy, Gandhipuram, Lakshmi Mills, Peelamedu, ESI, Singanallur)
- S9B - Udayampalayam to Ondipudur (Maniyakaranpalayam, Ganapathy, Gandhipuram, Lakshmi Mills, Peelamedu, ESI, Singanallur)
- S9D - NGGO Colony to Ondipudur (Thudiyalur, Vellakinar, Urumandampalayam, Ganapathy, Gandhipuram, Lakshmi Mills, Peelamedu, ESI, Singanallur)
- 69B - Maniyakaranpalayam to Peedampalli (Ganapathy, Gandhipuram, Lakshmi Mills, Peelamedu, ESI, Singanallur, Ondipudur)
- 97 - NGGO Colony to Ukkadam (Thudiyalur, Vellakinar, Urumandampalayam, Ganapathy, Gandhipuram, Railway Station, Town Hall)
- 15B - Chinnavedampatti to Ukkadam (Udayampalayam, Maniyakaranpalayam, Ganapathy, Gandhipuram, Railway Station, Town Hall)

== Agriculture ==
Traditionally a farming village which has transformed into an industrial area.

== Infrastructure ==
Administration is through the Ward councilor of the Coimbatore corporation.

== Cuisine ==
Rice is the main food. "Kamban soru" and "Rai Kali/koolu" are very popular during the summer months. "Kedaai vettu" and "Kochai kozhi" are to treat family, "Pangalis" (cousins) and friends. "Elaneer" (tender coconut, "Neer moru" (skimmed butter milk), "Nongu" (palm fruit) are consumed in large amounts during summer. Of course the mobile ice cream man (kone ice, kuchi ice, paal ice, semia ice, grape ice) and the "Soan papadi" man deserve mention. During Pongal season, "Motchai" (a type of bean), "Poosanikai" (pumpkin), "Arasanikai", "Senai kilangu" (a tuber) are prominent vegetables. Exotic fruits such as "Nagapalam", "Seenipuliyankai", "Nellikai" (Gooseberries), "Elanthaipalam" are sold door to door. In the bygone days, "Kambar cut", "Jow Mittai", "Thaen mittai", "Kadalai burupi", "Kadalai urundai", "Elanthai vadagam" were favourite snacks among the children and sold by vendors in front of the school.

== Temples ==
Sakthi Vinayar Kovil, Quarters bus stop

Shri Maha Bannari Amman Kovil, Lakshmipuram

Shri Maakaali Amman Kovil, Maniakaranpalayam

Shi Sakthi Mariamman Kovil

Shri Karuparayan Kovil

Muthukumaraswamy Kovil, Maniakaranpalayam

== Demographics ==
As of 2001 India census, Maniyakaranpalayam
