= Tatabad =

Coimbatore, Tamilnadu, India

- Neighbourhood
- Location of Tamil Nadu, India
- Coordinates: 11°1′9.9″N 76°57′24.9″E
- Elevation: 400 m (1,300 ft)
- Postal code: 641012
- Area code: 0422
- Vehicle registration: TN-66

Tatabad is a part of Coimbatore city. It's a residential cum commercial area. Its closer to Gandhipuram bus terminal. Coimbatore North Railway Station is located in this area. Adjacent places are Gandhipuram, Sivananda colony, Dr. Rajendra Prasath Road(100 feet road).

There is a science park which was started in 2008, near the corporation school on Algappa Chettiar road.

Following areas constitute Tatabad:

- Tatabad 1st cross road
- Tatabad 2nd cross road
- Tatabad 3rd cross road
- Tatabad 4th cross road
- Tatabad 5th cross road
- Tatabad 6th cross road
- Tatabad 7th cross road
- Tatabad 8th cross road
- Tatabad 9th cross road
- Tatabad 10th cross road
- Tatabad 11th cross road
- S.N.D Layout(South of Coimbatore North Junction)
- Dr.Subbrayan Street(Also known as deaf and Dumb road)
- Pykara Office Road(Near Power House)
- Hudco Colony cross 1 North
- Hudco Colony cross 1 South
- Hudco Colony cross 2 North
- Hudco Colony cross 2 South(Vinayaka TempleLocate here)
- Hudco Colony cross 3 North
- Hudco Colony cross 3 South
- Hudco Colony cross 4 North
- Hudco Colony cross 5 North
- Hudco Colony cross 6 North
- Hudco Colony cross 7 North
- Hudco Colony cross 8 North(Connecting Sampath Street with a major Bridge over Sanganoor Stream)
- Dr. Alagappa Chettiar Road(Also known as double side road, Its Pedestrians zone in Morning)
- Dr. Radhakrishan Road
- Six Corner(Major Junction in Tatabad)
- Western Parts of Dr.Rajendra Prasath road (100 feet road)

Land rates are going high in these places. Bus stops in the area includes Sivanandha Colony, Dr.RadhaKrishna Road(only no5 and 5C stops), Power House Road and Karpagam Cine Complex.
