= Ukkadam Bus Terminus =

Ukkadam Bus Stand உக்கடம் பேருந்து நிலையம்
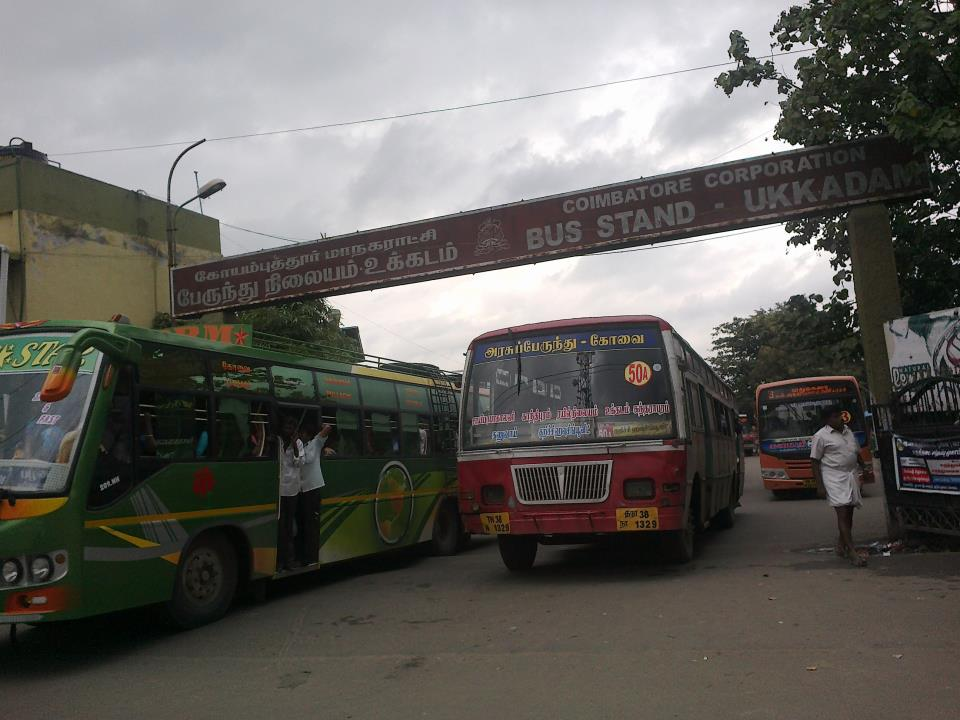

General information
- Location: Ukkadam, Coimbatore; Tamil Nadu. PIN – 641 001; India
- Coordinates: 10.988742°N 76.961730°E
- Owner: Coimbatore City Municipal Corporation
- Operator: Department of Transport (Tamil Nadu)
- Platforms: 4

Construction
- Parking: Yes
- Cycle facilities: Yes
- Accessible: Disabled access

Other information
- Station code: CBE
- Fare zone: TNSTC Coimbatore Division CBE/191

History
- Opened: 1991; 35 years ago

Passengers
- 30,000 per day
Location

Ukkadam Bus Terminus, popularly known as Ukkadam Bus Stand, is one of the bus terminus of Coimbatore City. It was opened in 1991 to ease congestion in the central bus stand at Gandhipuram.The bus stand was planned to accommodate town buses and buses to Pollachi and nearby places and Palakkad.

== Overview ==
This bus stand is located in the southern part of the city. Valankulam, a pond, was filled up to make space for this bus stand. Buses plying in south and west directions start from here. All town buses and mini buses start / pass through this bus stand. Departure timings of Tamil Nadu State Transport Corporation buses alone are given here. Facilities include a cloak room, toilets, rest room, parking facilities, TV, and STD booths. It includes cubicles where mothers can nurse their infants.

== Route ==
Location	Bus station	Destinations
Ukkadam	Ukkadam	Palakkad, Palani, Pollachi, Udumalpet

=== Destinations ===
- Pollachi (via Kinathukadavu)
- Udumalpet (via Pollachi)
- Palani (via Udumalpet)
- Dindigul (via Palani, Oddanchatram)
- Palakkad (via Walayar)
- Thrissur (via Palakkad)
- Anamalai (via Pollachi)
- Valparai (via Pollachi)
- Madurai (via Palani, Sempatty)

== Connections ==
The terminus is connected to all the major places within the city such as:

- Town Hall - 1.5 km
- Coimbatore Integrated Bus Terminus - 8.8 km
- Gandhipuram Central Bus Terminus - 4.8 km
- Singanallur Bus Terminus - 8.9 km
- Saibaba Colony Bus Terminus - 5.4 km
- Coimbatore Junction - 2 km
- Podanur Junction - 5.1 km
- Coimbatore International Airport - 12.4 km.
