= Gudalur (Coimbatore district) =

- Town
- Location in Tamil Nadu, India
- Coordinates: 11.153°N 76.936°E
- Country: India
- State: Tamil Nadu
- District: Coimbatore

Area
  - Total: 28.95 km^{2} (11.18 sq mi)

Population (2011)
  - Total: 38,859
  - Density: 1,342/km^{2} (3,476/sq mi)

Languages
  - Official: Tamil
- Time zone: UTC+5:30 (IST)

Gudalur is a town in Coimbatore district in the Indian state of Tamil Nadu. It is located in the north-western part of the state. Spread across an area of 28.95 km^{2} (11.18 sq mi), it had a population of 38,859 individuals as per the 2011 census.

== Geography and administration ==
Gudalur is located in Coimbatore North taluk of Coimbatore district in the Indian state of Tamil Nadu. Spread across an area of 21.68 km^{2} (8.37 sq mi), it is one of the 33 panchayat towns in the district. It is located in the western part of the state.

The town panchayat is headed by a chairperson, who is elected by the members, who are chosen through direct elections. The town forms part of the Mettupalayam Assembly constituency that elects its member to the Tamil Nadu legislative assembly and the Nilgiris Lok Sabha constituency that elects its member to the Parliament of India.

== Demographics ==
As per the 2011 census, Gudalur had a population of 38,859 individuals across 10,897 households. The population saw a significant increase compared to the previous census in 2001 when 21,966 inhabitants were registered. The population consisted of 19,707 males and 19,152 females. About 3,490 individuals were below the age of six years. The entire population is classified as urban. The town has an average literacy rate of 85.2%. About 8.8% of the population belonged to scheduled castes.

About 44% of the eligible population were employed full-time. Hinduism was the majority religion which was followed by 94% of the population, with Christianity (4.6%) and Islam (1.2%) being minor religions.
