= Podanur =

Coimbatore, Tamil Nadu, India

Coordinates: 10°57′00″N 76°59′00″E

- Neighbourhood
- Pothanur
- Interactive map of Podanur
- Country: India
- State: Tamil Nadu
- Region: Kongu Nadu
- District: Coimbatore

Languages
  - Official: Tamil
- Time zone: UTC+5:30 (IST)
- PIN: 641023
- Vehicle registration: TN 37 TN 99
- Telephone code: +91-422

Podanur or Pothanoor or Pothanur (Pōttaṉūr) is a neighbourhood in the city of Coimbatore in Tamil Nadu, India. Its history goes back to the creation of a major railway station and colony during British rule. The station was a major hub and is functional since 1862, after Royapuram Railway station.

== Podanur Junction ==
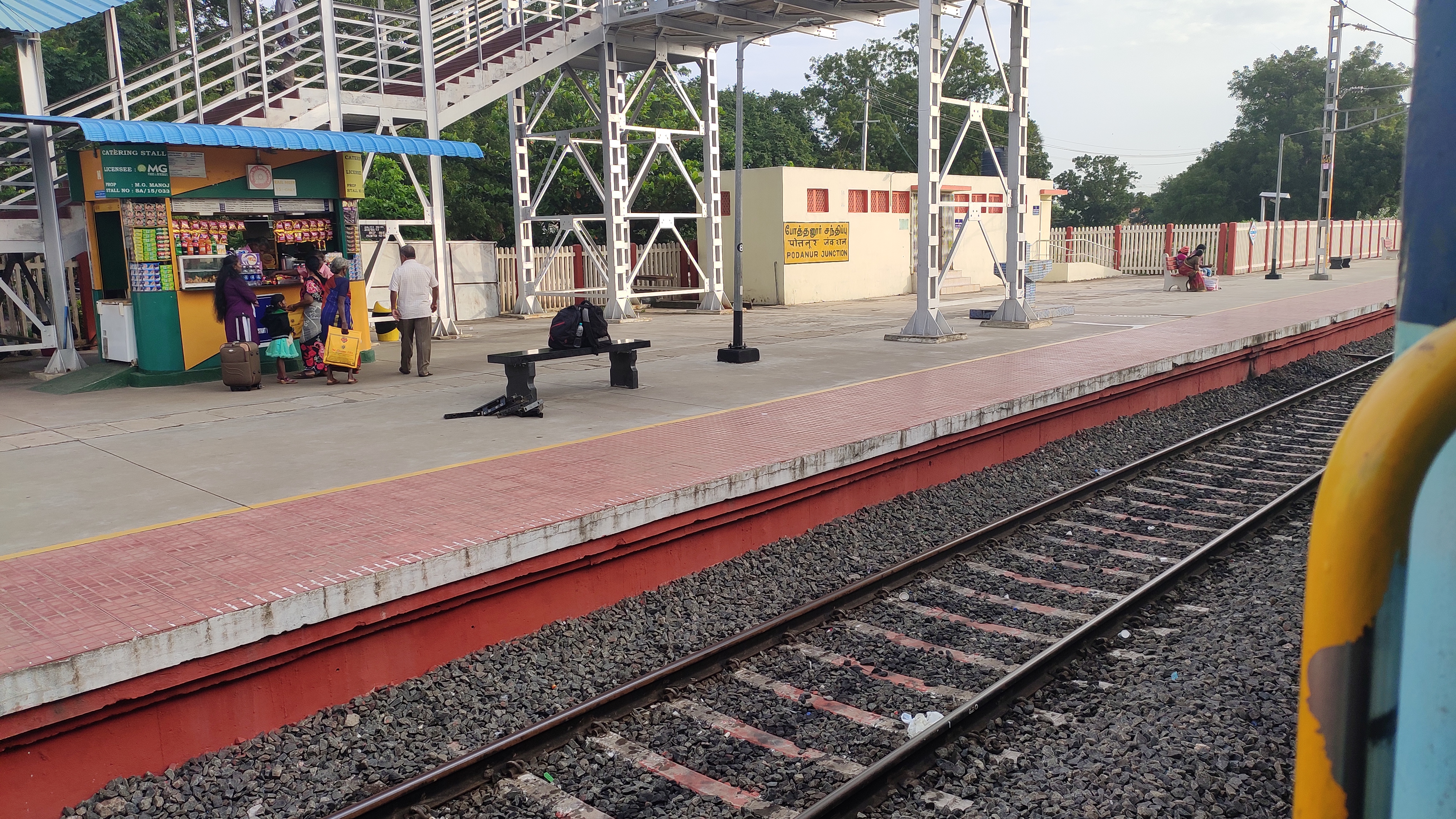
Podanur Railway station

Podanur railway junction is one of the oldest in South India (earlier than Chennai Central). It was established in the year 1862.

== Post office ==
Podanur Post office in the Coimbatore area. It was established in the year 1886.

== Gandhi visit ==
Mahatama Gandhi visited Podanur Junction on March 19, 1925.

== See also ==
- Railway stations in India
