= Gandhipuram, Coimbatore =

Coimbatore, Tamil Nadu, India

Gandhipuram
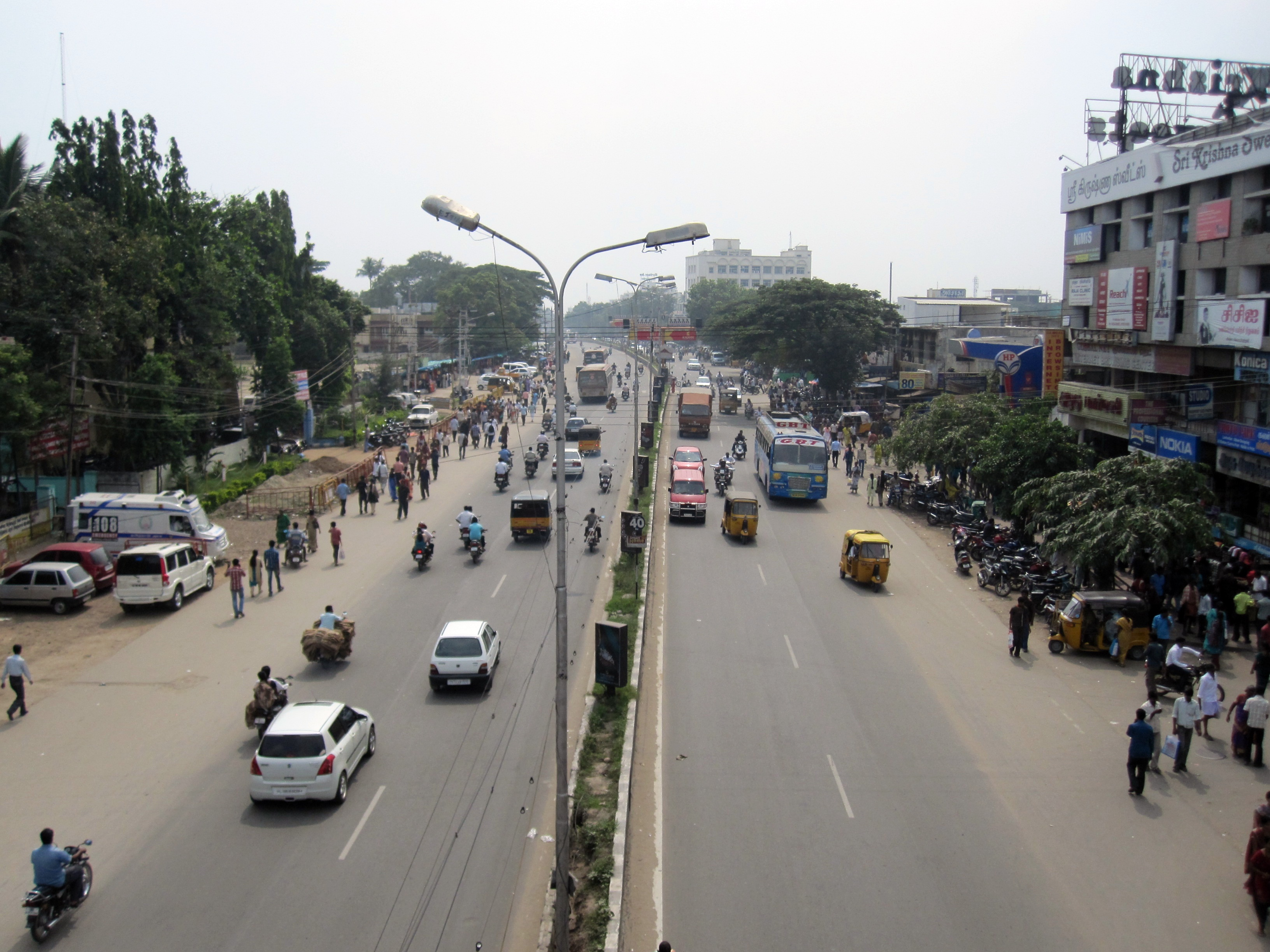
- Dr. Nanjappa Road (Old Photo)

- Location in Tamil Nadu, IndiaIndial
- Coordinates: 11.2°N 77.2°E
- Country: India
- State: Tamil Nadu
- District: Coimbatore
- Metro: Coimbatore
- Zone: Coimbatore North
- Ward: 30–33
- Named for: Mahatma Gandhi

Area
  - Total: 5 km^{2} (1.9 sq mi)
- Elevation: 411 m (1,348 ft)

Languages
  - Official: Tamil
- Time zone: UTC+5:30 (IST)
- PIN: 641012
- Telephone code: 91–422
- Vehicle registration: TN-66
- Lok Sabha constituency: Coimbatore
- Vidhan Sabha constituency: Coimbatore South

Gandhipuram is a major place of the Coimbatore city in Tamil Nadu, India. It is named after Mahatma Gandhi. It was previously known as "Katoor".

Gandhipuram developed as one of the key public transportation areas following the construction of the central bus terminus in 1974. Nanjappa Road, an arterial road, runs through Gandhipuram, connecting it with other parts of the city. Additional roads intersecting the locality include Cross Cut Road, 100 Feet Road, Bharathiar Road, and Sathy Road.

== Geography ==
It is located about 3.3 km from Townhall, which is the core of the city and a prominent retail centre, 12 km from Coimbatore Integrated Bus Terminus, 11 km from the Coimbatore International Airport, about 4 km from City railway station, 3 km from Coimbatore North Junction, 10 km from Podanur Junction railway station, and is well connected to local bus services to various parts of the city. Gandhipuram shares a border with Ganapathy, Ram Nagar, Tatabad, Sivananda Colony, Rathinapuri, Sidhapudur and PN Palayam.

== Economy ==
Gandhipuram is one of the major commercial centers in Coimbatore. Many industries in and around Coimbatore operate their corporate offices from Gandhipuram. Cross Cut Road and 100 Feet Road in Gandhipuram are among the major shopping areas in Coimbatore, alongside Oppanakara Street near Town Hall, they are known for its high-density textile and jewellery showrooms.

== Infrastructure ==
Coimbatore district central jail is in located in Gandhipuram. Due to its position as a key transit junction, Gandhipuram frequently experiences peak-hour congestion, especially near the central bus terminus and arterial roads. A two-tier flyover was constructed at a cost of ₹168 crore to alleviate traffic pressure, but junctions around Cross Cut Road and Sathy Road still face bottlenecks during commercial hours. The largest stadium of the city, Nehru Stadium, is about 3 km from Gandhipuram. While there are several gardens and parks in Coimbatore City, the largest garden and play area is VOC park and zoo.

=== Transport ===
Gandhipuram has Gandhipuram Central Bus Terminus, one of the major bus terminus in the city. It handles:

- Moffussil buses towards Erode, Tiruppur, Karur, Mettupalayam, Dharapuram, Salem, Gobichettipalayam and Sathyamangalam
- Buses towards other states: Kerala, Karnataka, Andhra Pradesh and Puducherry

== Gallery ==
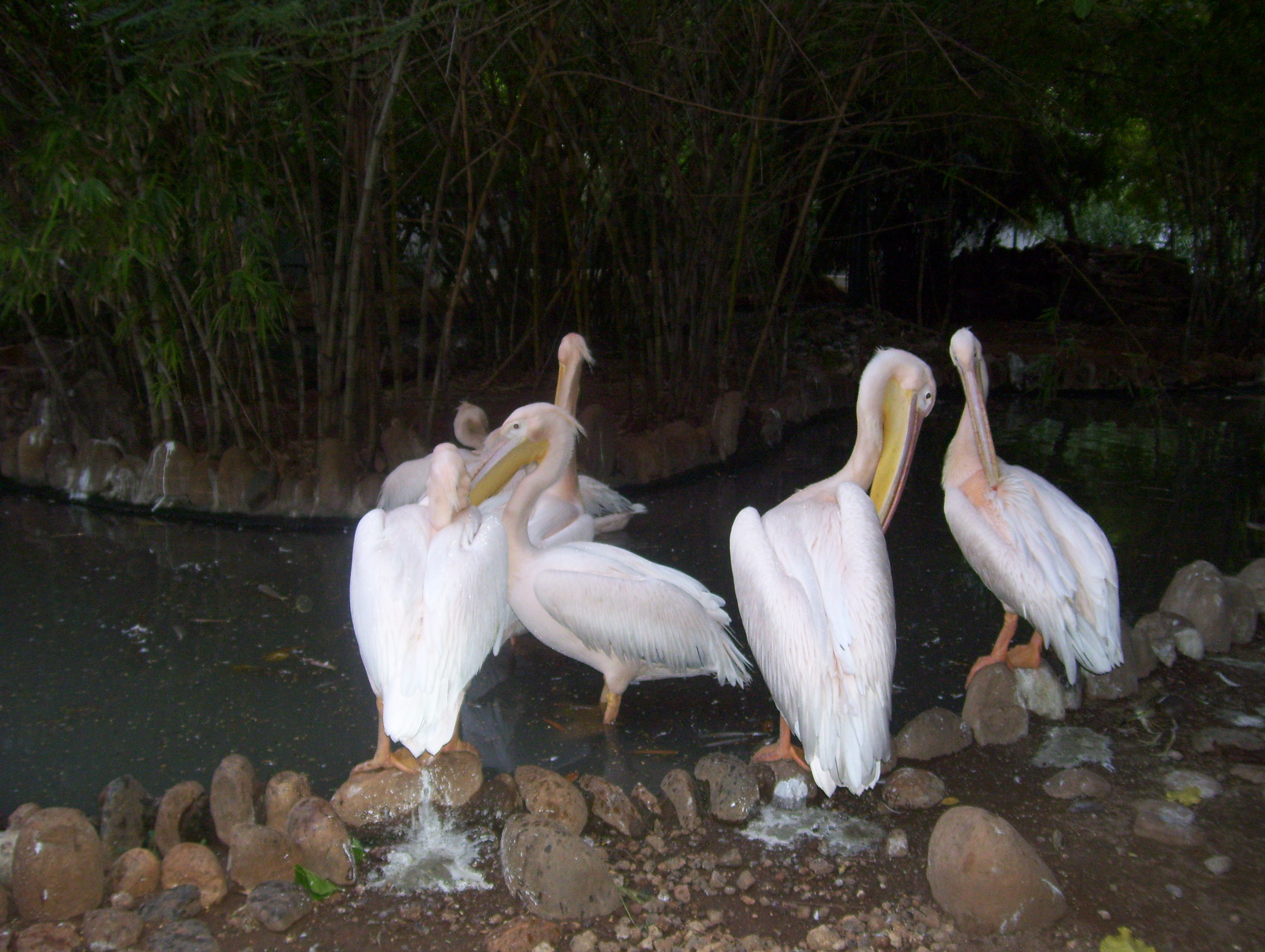
VOC Park

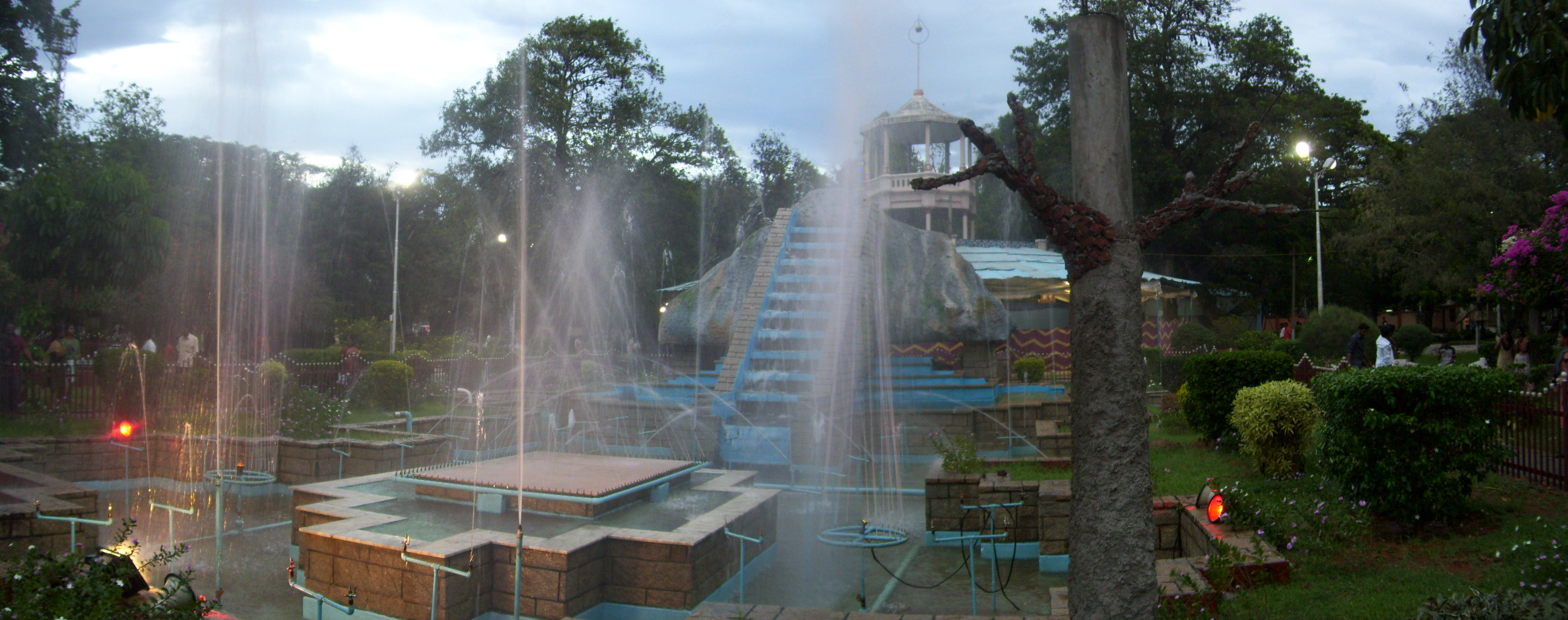
VOC Park

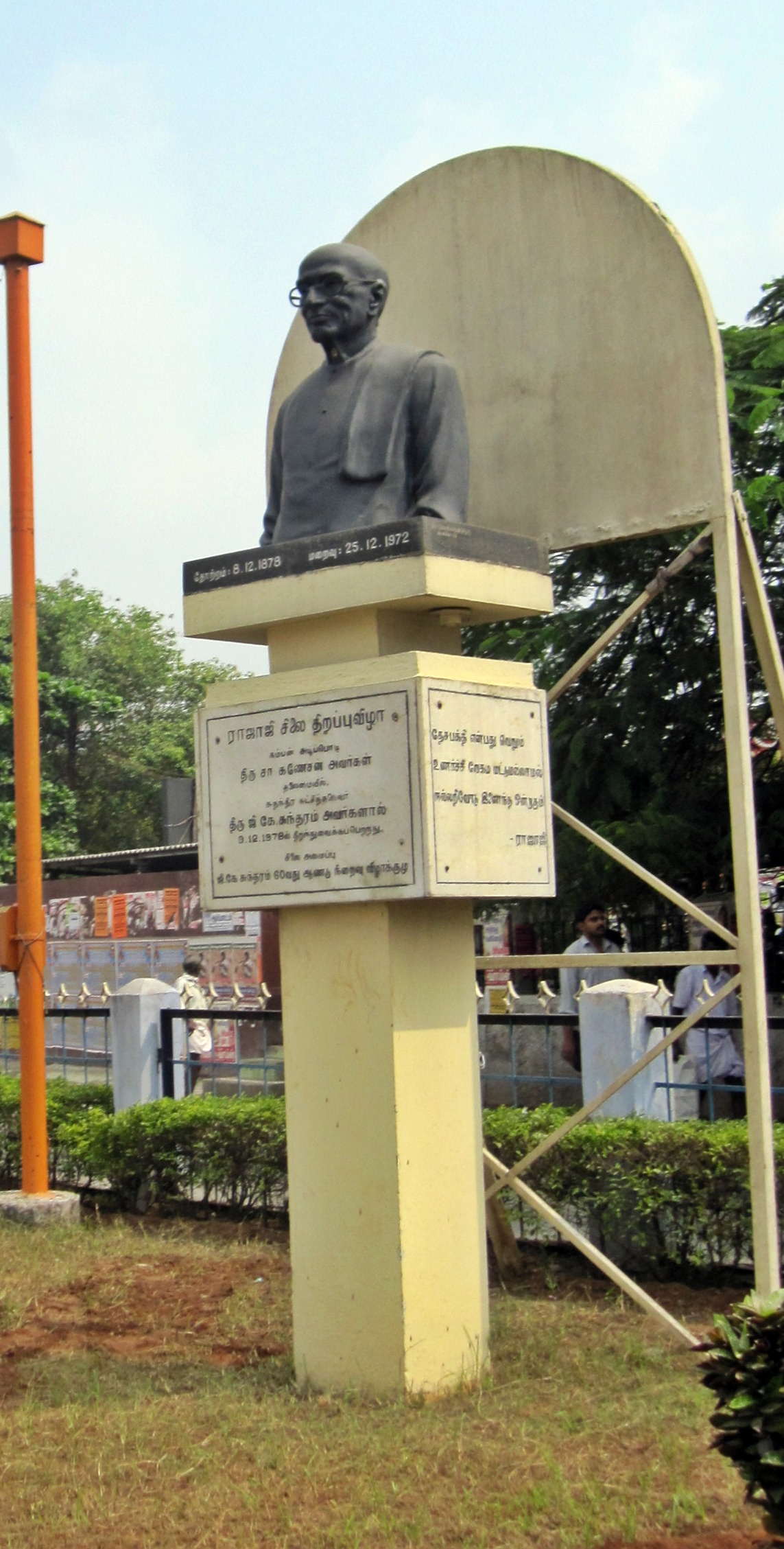
Rajaji Statue

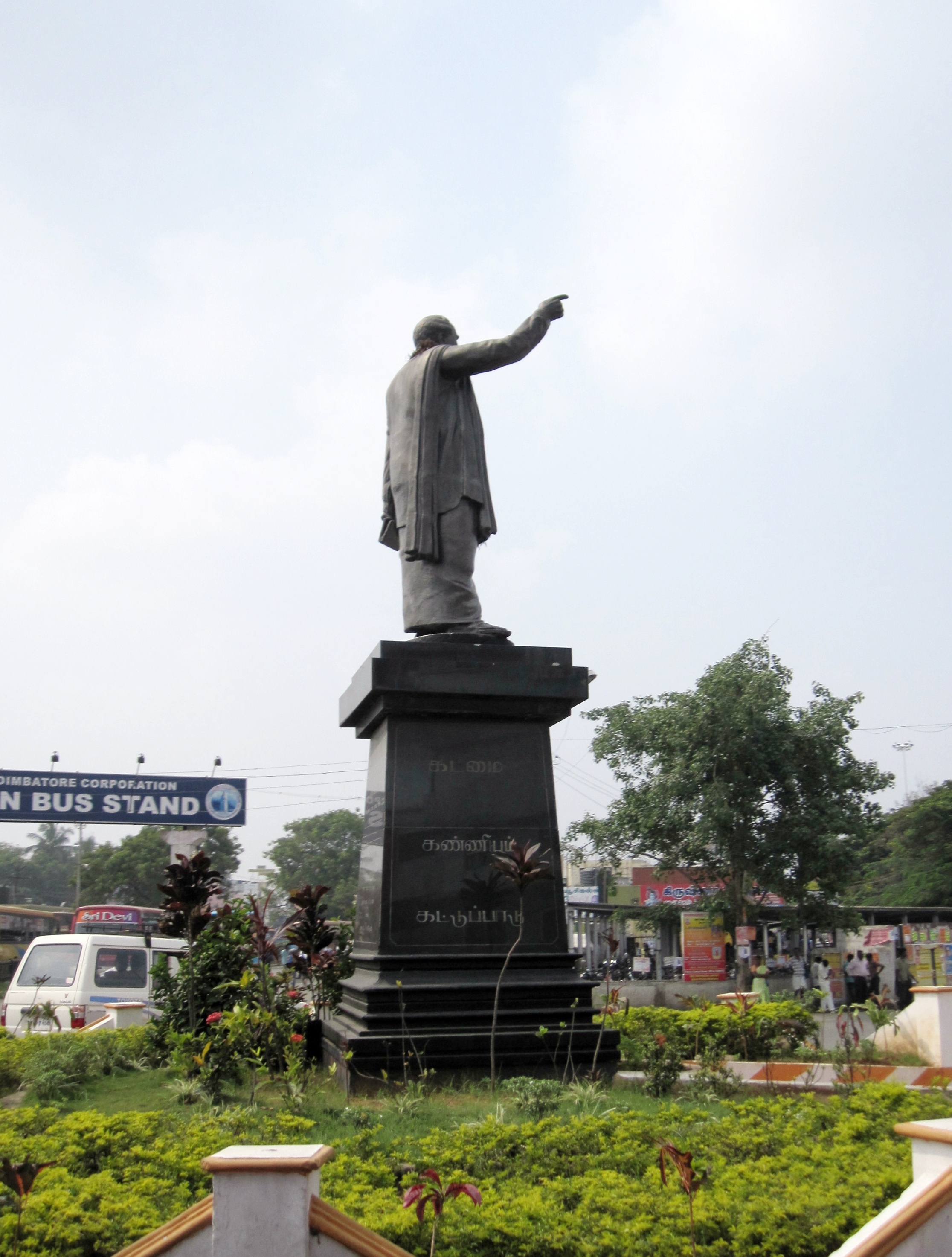
Anna statue
