= Department of Transport (Tamil Nadu) =

Indian state government department

Department of Transport of the state of Tamil Nadu

Agency overview
- Formed: 1811
- Jurisdiction: Tamil Nadu
- Headquarters: Chennai
- Minister responsible: Vijay Tamilan Parthiban, Minister for Transport Department
- Agency executives: K.Manivasan, IAS, Principal Secretary to Government; Kiran Gurrala, IAS, Transport and Road Safety Commissioner
- Parent agency: Government of Tamil Nadu
- Child agencies: Commissionerate of Transport and Road Safety (Tamil Nadu); State Transport Authority (Tamil Nadu)
- Website: Transport Department

The Department of Transport of the state of Tamil Nadu is one of the departments of Government of Tamil Nadu.

== Objective ==
The transport department is responsible for the maintenance of public transport and has control over seven transport undertakings. The department is also the nodal agency of the state government for projects implemented by the Indian Railways as well as Department of Railways, the department of communications and the civil aviation of the Government of India.

== Functions ==
The major functions of the Transport Department is as follows:

- Driving, conductor, and driving school licensing
- Vehicle registration, ownership transfer, and fitness certification
- Transport permit administration and tax collection
- Enforcement of motor vehicle laws and vehicle inspections
- Road safety, accident prevention, and pollution control
- Regulation of Pollution Control Checking Centres
- Coordination during disasters, elections, and emergencies with district administration and police.
- Interstate permit and check-post administration
- Monitoring road safety committees and accident relief centres
- Road safety Initiatives

== Sub-departments ==
The commissionerate of transport (State Transport Authority) and Tamil Nadu motor vehicles maintenance department function under the department.

=== Commissionerate of Transport ===
The Transport and Road Safety Commissioner is the head of the department. The Transport Commissioner is assisted by Joint Transport Commissioners and Deputy Transport Commissioners in various matters such as road safety, enforcement, rules, and administration.

The field-level formations are zones headed by Joint Transport Commissioners or Deputy Transport Commissioners, who supervise Regional Transport Officers (RTOs). The Regional Transport Officers are assisted by Motor Vehicle Inspectors in vehicle registration, licensing, other transport services, and motor vehicle law enforcement.

There are total 14 Zonal Transport Offices and 91 Regional Transport Offices in Tamil Nadu.

Transport authority

The state transport authority controls the major public transport agencies of the state: Tamil Nadu State Transport Corporation (TNSTC), State Express Transport Corporation (SETC) and Metropolitan Transport Corporation (MTC). It is also responsible for managing the licensing and permits for private buses. As of 2023, the state transport units operated 20,213 buses apart from 7,814 private buses and 3,990 mini-buses. TNSTC has six operational divisions operating under the department and operates most inter-city services and intra-city services except in Chennai while SETC operates long distances bus services connecting major towns. MTC is responsible for public bus transportation in Chennai.

The department also manages the following undertakings:

- Tamil Nadu Transport Development Finance Corporation (TDFC): Financing and budgeting for public transport infrastructure
- Institute of Road Transport (IRT): Education and research on road transport
- Pallavan Transport Consultancy Services (PTCS): Planning and consultancy on transport
- Chennai Unified Metropolitan Transport Authority (CUMTA): Integration of all public transport within the Chennai metropolitan area including the sub-urban railway, MRTS and metro

Vehicle maintenance

The motor vehicle maintenance department is responsible for the maintenance and repair of all government owned vehicles including that of the chief minister.

== Ministers ==
- Vijay Tamilan Parthiban (2026 - Present)
- S. S. Sivasankar (2021- 2026)
- M. R. Vijayabhaskar (2016-21)
- V. Senthil Balaji (2011-16)
- K. N. Nehru (2006-11)
- Nainar Nagenthran (2001-06)
- K. Ponmudy (1996-2001)
- K. A. Sengottaiyan (1991-96)

== See also ==
- Government of Tamil Nadu
- Tamil Nadu Government's Departments
