= Podanur Junction railway station =

Railway station in Coimbatore

Coordinates: 10°57′00″N 76°59′00″E

Podanur Junction
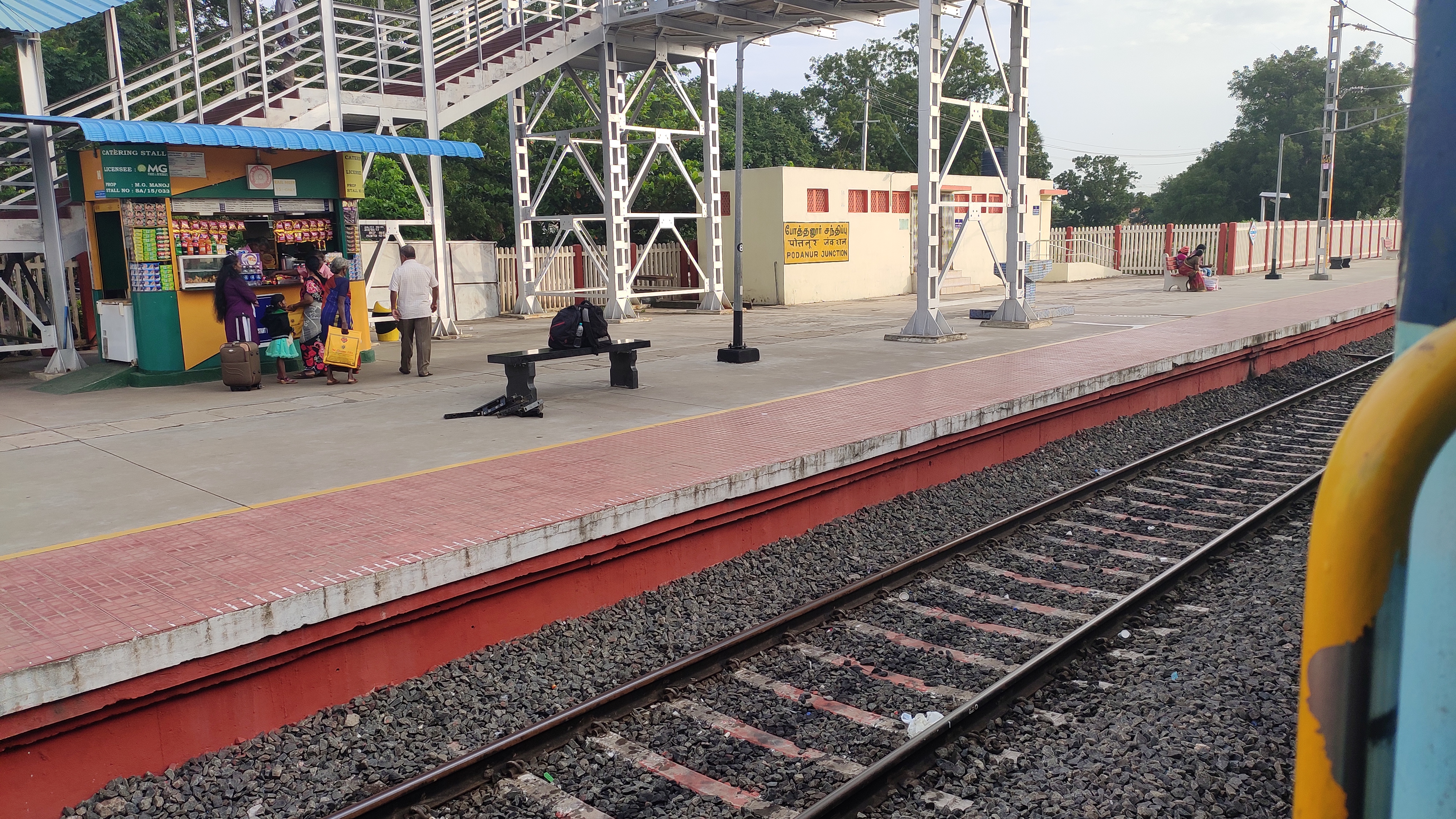
- Podanur railway station.

General information
- Location: Podanur, Coimbatore, Tamil Nadu; India
- System: rail station
- Owner: Indian Railways
- Lines: Jolarpettai–Shoranur line Coimbatore–Pollachi line
- Platforms: 5
- Tracks: 8

Construction
- Structure type: Standard (on-ground station)
- Parking: Available

Other information
- Status: Functioning
- Station code: PTJ
- Zone(s): Southern Railway zone
- Division(s): Salem
- Fare zone: Southern Railway zone

History
- Opened: 1862; 164 years ago
Location

Podanur Junction railway station (station code: PTJ) is an Indian railway station in Podanur, Coimbatore. It comes under the purview of the Salem railway division of Southern Railway zone and is categorised as NSG-4 under the Indian railway station classification system.

== History ==
Train service in Coimbatore started with the opening of the railway station at Podanur in 1862 as a part of the Podanur–Madras line connecting the west coast with the rest of India. It was the third functional railway station within the boundaries of the present day Tamil Nadu. A branch line connecting Podanur with Mettupalayam became operational in February 1873. Until 1956, the Podanur Railway Division was functioning with Podanur as the headquarters before the headquarters was shifted to Olavakkode which became Palakkad railway division. The station became part of the newly formed Salem railway division in 2006. As of 2023, it is classified as a NSG-5 station (annual revenue between 10 and 100 million rupees and 1–2 million passengers handled).

== Lines ==
The station has five platforms and is reworked under Amrit bharat station scheme of Indian Railways. The station serves as satellite junction of Coimbatore in Jolarpettai–Shoranur line and the Coimbatore–Pollachi line with the Coimbatore–Mettupalayam line branching out from the Coimbatore North Junction.

== Services ==
This station handles long-distance trains and local trains. The station is located in Coimbatore south region serves as an important halt for all Passenger and long-distance train.

On 11 March 2026, the 16619/16620 Podanur–Dhanbad Amrit Bharat Express was flagged off from Podanur station, marking the introduction of the first dedicated long-distance train service originating from Podanur towards eastern India. This development strengthened the station’s importance in long-distance passenger connectivity and expanded direct rail links from the Coimbatore region.

== See also ==
- Transport in Coimbatore
