= Coimbatore International Airport =

Airport in Coimbatore, Tamil Nadu, India

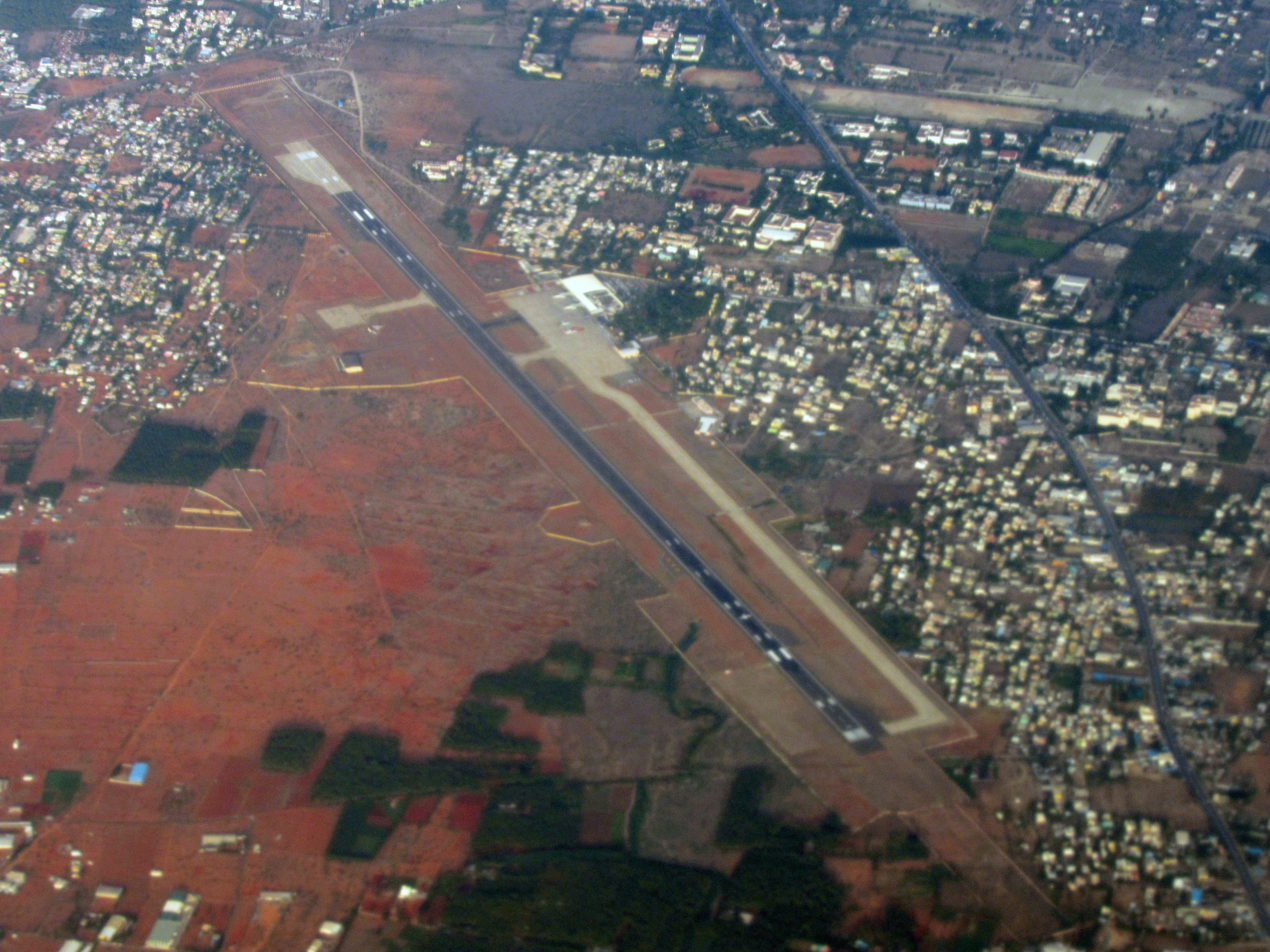
- Aerial view of the airport in 2016
- IATA: CJB; ICAO: VOCB

Summary
- Airport type: Public
- Owner: Ministry of Civil Aviation
- Operator: Airports Authority of India
- Serves: Coimbatore Metropolitan Area
- Location: Peelamedu, Coimbatore, Tamil Nadu, India
- Focus city for: IndiGo
- Time zone: IST (+5:30)
- Elevation AMSL: 400 m (1,300 ft)
- Coordinates: 11°01′36″N 077°02′30″E
- Website: Coimbatore Airport

Map
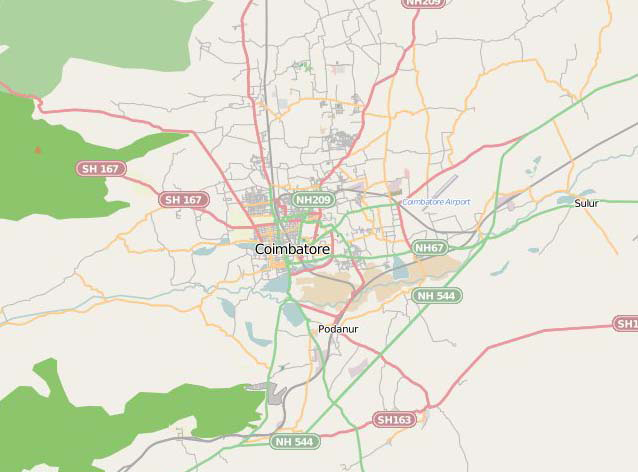
- Location within Coimbatore Location within Tamil Nadu Location within India

Runways
Direction	Length		Surface
Direction	m	ft	Surface
05/23	2,990	9,809	Asphalt

Statistics (April 2025 – March 2026)
- Passengers: 34,20,745 (▲5.2%)
- Aircraft movements: 22,462 (▲2.9%)
- Cargo tonnage: 13,176.3 (▲8.5%)
- Source: AAI

Coimbatore International Airport (IATA: CJB, ICAO: VOCB) is an international airport and the primary airport serving the Coimbatore Metropolitan Area in Tamil Nadu, India. It is located in the neighborhood of Peelamedu, about 10 km (6.2 mi) from the center of the city. It is the second-busiest airport in the state by passengers handled, aircraft movements, and freight handled after Chennai International Airport. The airport is served by four carriers providing direct connectivity to thirteen domestic and three international destinations.

== History ==
The airport was established in 1940. In 1948, Air India operated scheduled services on the Madras–Bangalore–Coimbatore–Cochin–Thiruvananthapuram route six times a week. Coimbatore flying club and aviation training academy was established in 1960. The airport then known as Pilamedu aerodrome underwent development and extension in the 1960s. In 1987, the airport underwent modernization and further expansion of the existing runway to enable handling of larger jet aircraft. In 1990, the airport was developed to enable night landing.

On 6 June 2012, the Indian prime minister declared the union government's intention to upgrade the airport to international status. The union cabinet granted international status to the airport on 2 October 2012.

== Infrastructure ==
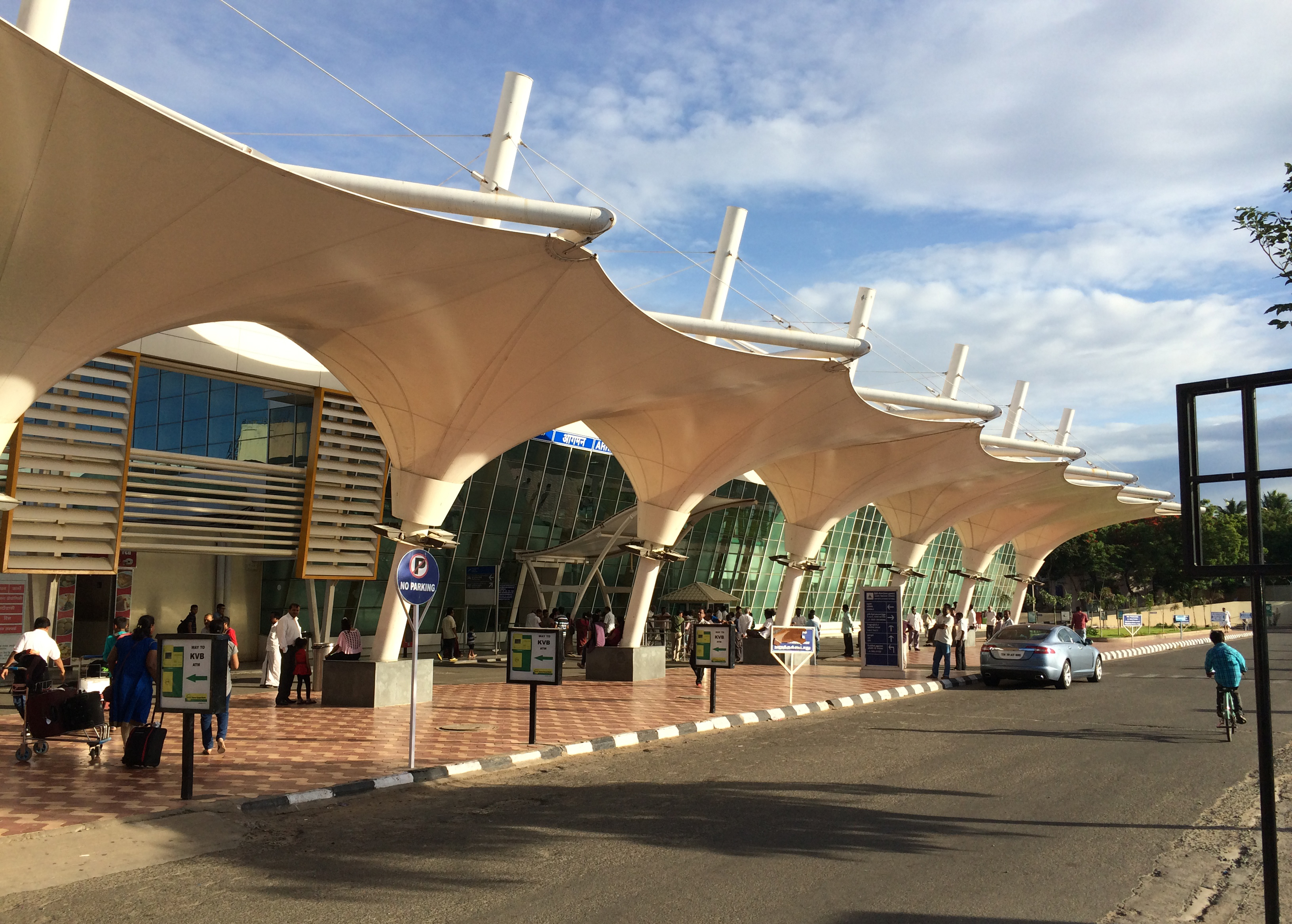
Facade of the airport in 2019

The airport has one runway, which was extended from 2,590 m (8,500 ft) to 2,990 m (9,810 ft) in 2008 to accommodate larger aircraft. In 2008, the airport was expanded at a cost of ₹780 million (US$8.1 million) with the addition of nine parking bays, aero bridges and Instrument Landing System (ILS). In 2010, separate domestic and international divisions were added to the existing common terminal. There are two hangars in the airport; one provides housing for the planes of Coimbatore Flying Club, the other provides shelter for private carriers. The airport has a parking management system with a capacity to accommodate nearly 300 cars.

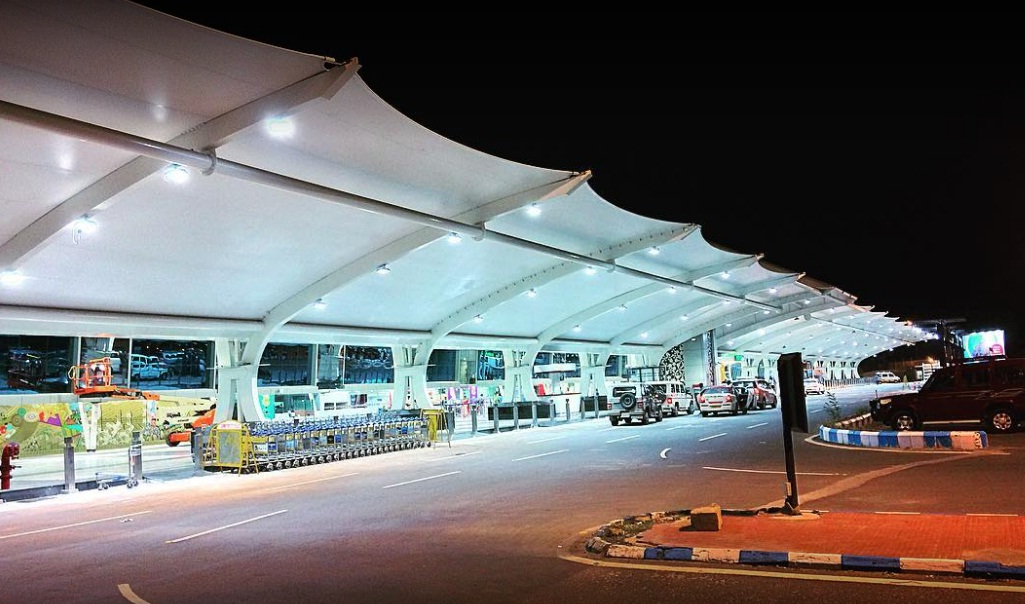
Road leading to the main entrance

In 2019, Airports Authority of India (AAI) proposed to construct a new domestic departure terminal building on the eastern side of the airport and a new integrated Air Traffic Control tower and administrative building. The new terminal was planned on a 11,870 sq ft (1,103 m^{2}) area at an estimated cost of ₹171.79 crore (US$18 million). The project also involved the addition of three aero bridges and an additional parking lot to accommodate 100 cars. The construction of the new terminal building was slated to increase the handling capacity of the airport to three million passengers per annum. Multiple tenders for the construction of the new terminal building and associated works have been released by AAI since 2020. In December 2022, the central government announced plans for further investment of ₹20 billion (US$210 million) for the modernisation and expansion of the airport. It was announced that the works would commence once the requisite land acquisition is complete and the expanded airport was projected to be able to handle 15 million passengers per annum.

== Airlines and destinations ==
=== Passenger ===
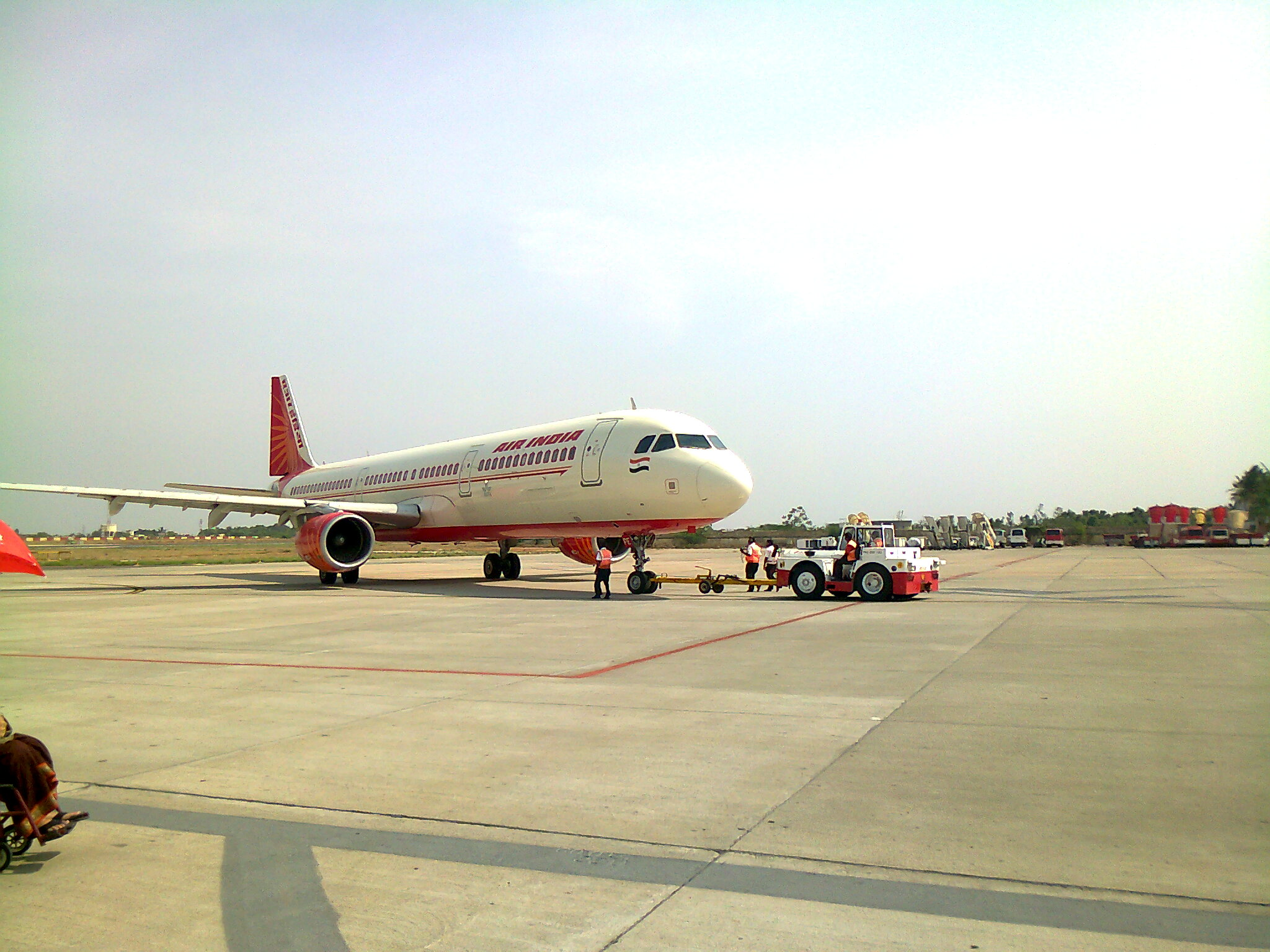
Air India Airbus A321 at the airport

Airlines	Destinations
Air Arabia	Sharjah
Air India	Delhi, Mumbai
Air India Express	Bengaluru, Mumbai
IndiGo	Abu Dhabi, Ahmedabad, Bengaluru, Chennai, Delhi, Durgapur, Goa–Dabolim, Guwahati, Hyderabad, Mumbai, Navi Mumbai, Pune, Shirdi
Scoot	Singapore

=== Cargo ===
Airlines	Destinations
Amazon Air	Bengaluru

== Statistics ==
Busiest domestic routes (2024–25)
Rank	Airport	Carriers	Passengers
1	Chennai, Tamil Nadu	Air India, IndiGo	920,697
2	Mumbai, Maharashtra	Air India, IndiGo, Vistara	734,677
3	Delhi	IndiGo, Vistara	424,697
4	Hyderabad, Telangana	IndiGo	391,155
5	Bangalore, Karnataka	IndiGo	371,123
6	Pune, Maharashtra	IndiGo	116,485
7	Mopa, Goa	IndiGo	22,547
8	Ahmedabad, Gujarat	IndiGo	21,942
9	Dabolim, Goa	IndiGo	20,992
10	Jaipur, Rajasthan	IndiGo	10,528

Busiest international routes (2024–25)
Rank	Airport	Carriers	Passengers
1	Singapore	Scoot, IndiGo	150,927
2	Sharjah, United Arab Emirates	Air Arabia	77,930
3	Abu Dhabi, United Arab Emirates	IndiGo	26,483

== Connectivity ==
The airport is located along the Avinashi Road, about 10 km (6.2 mi) from the city center. Bus services into the city are available from the bus stop located around 700 m (2,300 ft) from the airport. Intracity bus services are available from Gandhipuram central bus station and also from other auxiliary bus stations at Singanallur and Ukkadam. The airport is located 11 km (6.8 mi) from the major rail head at Coimbatore Junction and the nearest rail stations are at Peelamedu and Singanallur. The proposed Coimbatore Metro is planned to connect to the airport. Taxis and auto rickshaws provide 24 hours commuting services to the airport.

== Incidents ==
- On 13 December 1950, a Douglas DC-3 (registered VT-CFK) of Air India carrying 17 passengers and four crew from Bombay to Coimbatore, crashed into high ground near Kotagiri due to a navigational error, killing all the passengers on board.

== See also ==
- Sulur Air Force Station
- List of airports in India
