= Nanjundapuram =

- Neighbourhood
- Location in Tamil Nadu, IndiaIndial
- Coordinates: 10.971750°N 76.969322°E
- Country: India
- State: Tamil Nadu
- District: Coimbatore
- Metro: Coimbatore
- Zone: Coimbatore Central

Area
  - Total: 9 km^{2} (3.5 sq mi)
- Elevation: 411 m (1,348 ft)

Languages
  - Official: Tamil
- Time zone: UTC+5:30 (IST)
- PIN: 641036
- Telephone code: 91–422
- Vehicle registration: TN-66
- Lok Sabha constituency: Coimbatore
- Vidhan Sabha constituency: Singanallur

Nanjundapuram is a residential neighbourhood of the city of Coimbatore in Tamil Nadu, India. It is one of the well developed neighborhoods in the city and has been part of Coimbatore Corporation since 1981. The name "Nanjundapuram" is derived from the Nanjundeshwarar Temple located on the banks of Noyyal river.

== Geography ==
The major roads in Nanjundapuram include Ramanathapuram Road, Podanur Road, Vellalore Road and Kurichi Road. It is located about 11 km from the Coimbatore International Airport and about 5.3 km from City railway station, 7.1 km from Gandhipuram Central Bus Terminus and 3.4 km from Podanur railway station and 7.5 km from Coimbatore Integrated Bus Terminus. Nanjundapuram shares its border with Ramanathapuram, Podanur, Vellalore, Singanallur and Kurichi.

== Infrastructure ==
A two-lane Nanjundapuram flyover is constructed over the two railway lines passing from Coimbatore Junction to Podanur Junction and from Podanur Junction to Irugur Junction. The flyover was planned to reduce traffic congestion in Ramanathapuram Road.

== Locality ==
Nanjundapuram is a prominent residential locality in Coimbatore with a prominent immigrant population. The various schools in the locality are:

- Nadar High School
- Saradha Nursery & Primary School

== Hospitals ==
- Urban Primary Health Centre

== Transport ==
The nearest railway station is located at Podanur Junction. The defunct Nanjundapuram railway station was serving the locality until 1960's. The 1 km long Nanjundapuram Railway link line became completely defunct and was dismantled soon after the Coimbatore North Junction – Irugur Junction line was put to use. Restoration of this Nanjundapuram Railway link line will help plan circular suburban electric train track connecting major train stations in the suburban areas of Coimbatore like Mettupalayam, Irugur and Pollachi etc. to ease growing peripheral traffic. Reopening this defunct Nanjundapuram Railway line & Station can benefit residents from Nanjundapuram, Ramanathapuram, Redfields, Puliakulam, Sowripalayam, Udayampalayam, Singanallur, Varadarajapuram, Uppilipalayam and Ondipudur areas of the Coimbatore city for train connections to onward destinations.

== Coimbatore Metro ==
Coimbatore Metro feasibility study is completed and one of the route planned from Ukkadam to Coimbatore Integrated Bus Terminus is planned. There are considerations to make the corridor pass through Nanjundapuram, since the availability of space is better.

== Politics ==
The locality of Nanjundapuram is a part of Singanallur state assembly constituency and Coimbatore Lok Sabha constituency.
