= Ulagalandha Perumal Temple, Singanallur =

Hindu temple in Coimbatore district

Religion
- Affiliation: Hinduism
- District: Coimbatore district
- Festivals: Brahmotsav, Thiru Ōnam festival, Sri Vāmana Jayanthi, Mārgazhi utsav, Vaikunta Ekādasi, Sri Rāma Navami, Navrātri, Tamil New year day, Special poojas on Purattaasi Saturdays.

Location
- Location: Singanallur
- State: Tamil Nadu
- Country: India
- Interactive map of Ulagalandha Perumal Temple, Singanallur
- Coordinates: 10.9968°N 77.0305°E

Architecture
- Elevation: 414 m (1,358 ft)

Website
- hrce.tn.gov.in

Ulagalandha Perumal Temple is a Vaishnavite temple in Singanallur neighbourhood of Coimbatore district in the state of Tamil Nadu in the peninsular India. It is also called as 'Sree Three Vikrama Narayana Swamy temple'. Moolavar is Ulagalandha Perumal. Utsav deity is also Ulagalandha Perumal. Utsav goddesses are Sridevi and Bhoodevi. Viruksha is Vanni tree. Poojas are performed on the basis of Pancharatram Ahama. It was built by Chola Karaikalan, 180 years ago. Moolavar is made up of 'Panchloha' (five metals) and it poses facing north. The utsav deity is also made up of Panchloha. Moolavar is in a standing posture, with his right leg on the ground and his left leg facing the sky. Out of his eight hands, six of them carry different weapons and the other two with the signs that bless the devotees. Renovation works were carried out in the year 2000. In the year 2005, Kumbabhishek was performed for the 7-tiered giant tower.

== Location ==
Under the control of Hindu Religious and Charitable Endowments Department, with the temple ID TM010002, this temple is located at an altitude of 414 m above the mean sea level.

== Beneficial neighbourhoods ==
Coimbatore, Singanallur, Vellalore, Ondipudur, Irugur, Peelamedu, Ramanathapuram are some of the important neighbourhoods benefited by this temple.

== Festivals ==
Brahmotsav, Thiru Ōnam festival, Sri Vāmana Jayanthi, Mārgazhi utsav, Vaikunta Ekādasi, Sri Rāma Navami, Navrātri, Tamil New year day, Special poojas on Purattaasi Saturdays. On Purattaasi 4th Saturdays, Namasong keerthana performed.

== History ==
During his visit to Karur, pertaining to war, King Chola Karikalan, also visited Vellalore in Coimbatore. Nearer to Vellalore is situated Singanallur which was then visited by him and he planned to construct a temple for the welfare of people of Singanallur. So, was constructed this temple thereafter. These inscriptions are found in the idol of Moolavar.

== Other deities ==
Apart from Ulagalandha Perumal, Sridevi, Bhoodevi, Mahalakshmi, Ramanujar, Thirumangaiazhwar, Periyazhwar, Nammazhwar, Andal, Prasanna Vinayagar, Jayan and Vijayan are other important deities found in this temple. Chakkarathazhwar and Anjaneyar are found at the entrance in tall, standing postures. Prasanna Vinayagar is facing east and all other deities face north.
