= Coimbatore bypass =

Road in India

Coimbatore Bypass Road
- L&T Bypass
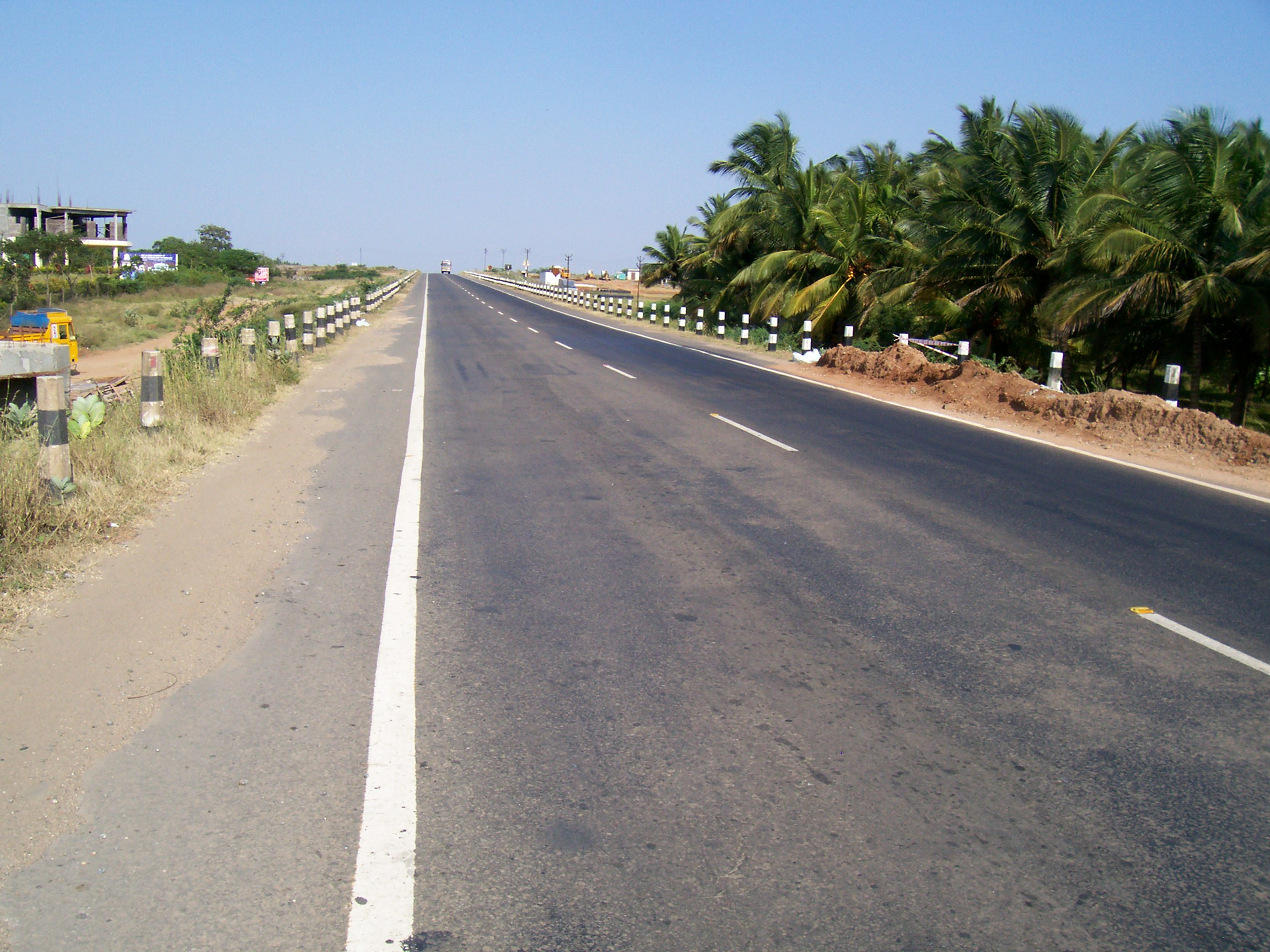
- Coimbatore Bypass Road connecting NH 544 near Madukkarai

Route information
- Maintained by National Highways Authority of India, Coimbatore City Municipal Corporation, Highways and Minor Ports Department
- Length: 28 km (17 mi)
- Existed: 2000–present

Major junctions
- From: Neelambur, Coimbatore district
- To: Madukkarai, Coimbatore district

Location
- Country: India
- Major cities: Eachanari, Ondipudur, Vellalore, Chettipalayam, Irugur

Highway system
- Roads in India; Expressways; National; State; Asian

The Coimbatore Bypass Road refers to a series of bypasses connecting the various National Highways and State Highways passing through and originating in the South Indian city of Coimbatore.

The Coimbatore City Municipal Corporation is undertaking the construction of six rail-over-bridges in the city.

In 2008, the State Highways Department proposed creating a ring road passing through Peelamedu Road, Kalapatti Road, Saravanampatty Road and Kurumbapalayam Road to help decongest Avanashi Road, Mettupalayam Road and Sathyamangalam Road. The 12 km road would extend from the South India Textile Research Association (SITRA) Junction in Peelamedu, go through Kalapatti Road, connect Sathyamangalam Road at Saravanampatty, and then connect Mettuppalayam Road at Kurumbapalayam.

== Neelambur–Madukkarai super highway ==
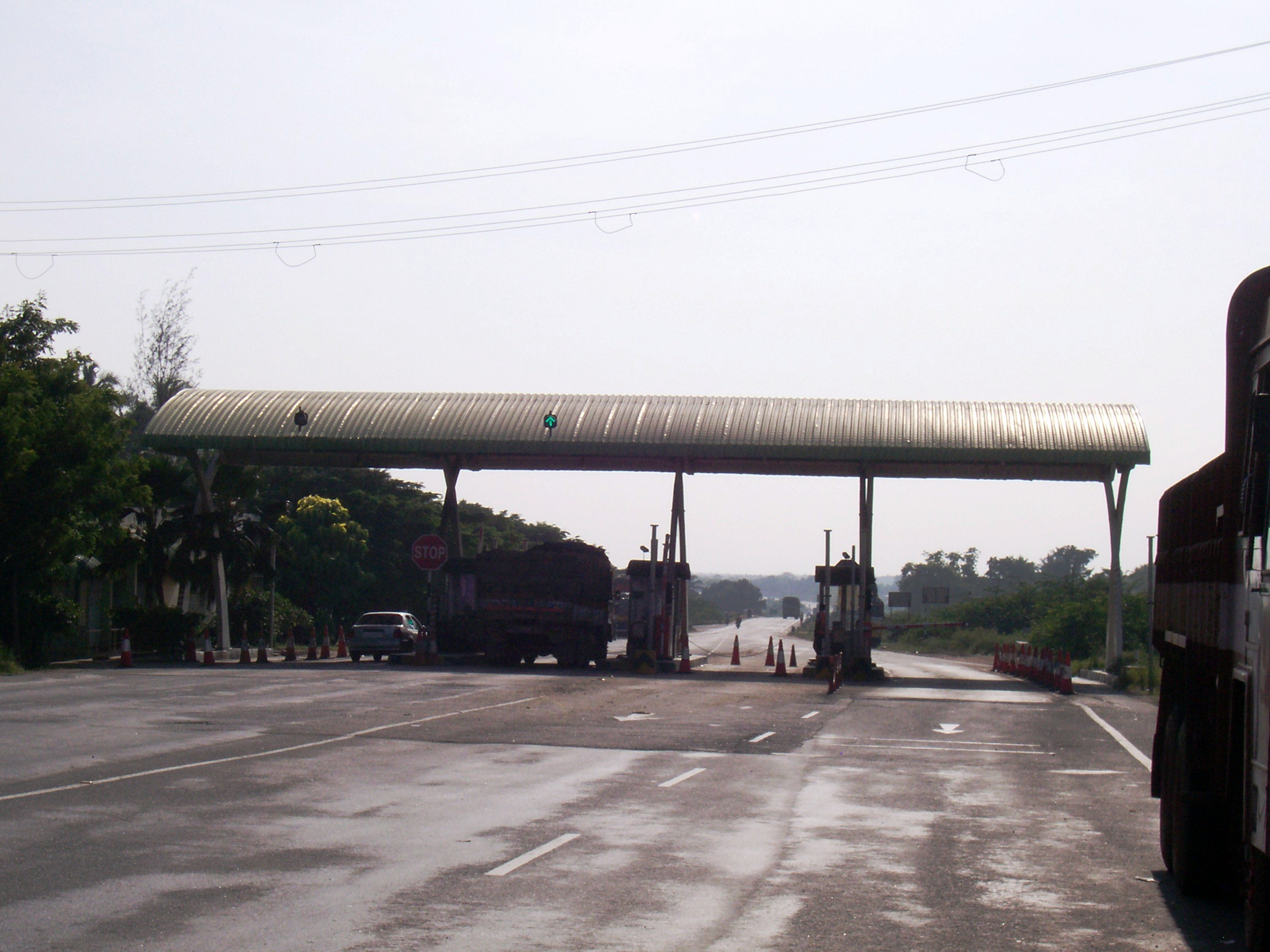
Neelambur Toll Plaza

The first section of the bypass was a 28-kilometre (17 mi) two-laned road with paved shoulders built by Larsen & Toubro (L&T) from Neelambur to Madukkarai on National Highway 544 (formerly National Highway 47) which intersects Trichy Road at Chintamani Pudur near Irugur and Eachanari on Pollachi Road. Land acquisition began as early as 1974, but the project was delayed. Construction began in 1998, and was completed in 22 months. It was made operational in 2000, after many delays which almost forced L&T to pull out. It was the first road privatisation project to be implemented on a build-operate-transfer model in South India. In 2010, the National Highways Authority of India gave Iragavarapu Venkata Reddy Construction Limited (IVRCL) the tender to widen and toll the road as part of a larger toll road project from Chengapalli to Walayar. The issue was taken to court and the Delhi High Court restrained the road transport ministry from withdrawing the project awarded to Larsen & Toubro. In late January 2012, it was reported that IVRCL planned to sell the project, valued at an estimated ₹ 10 billion, and Reliance Infrastructure was said to be a "likely frontrunner" to acquire it. In 2011, the Communist Party of India (Marxist) demanded that the road be widened to four lanes.

The road is subject to frequent traffic delays, most caused by the road's six toll plazas; there are only four toll collection lanes on each toll plaza, two in each direction, and much of the time only one is open in each direction.

The road is also subject to fatal accidents. This road has a lot of intersections on this 30km stretch. Two wheelers frequently have their crossing, and accidents are frequent, especially at night.

=== Aathupalam Bridge ===
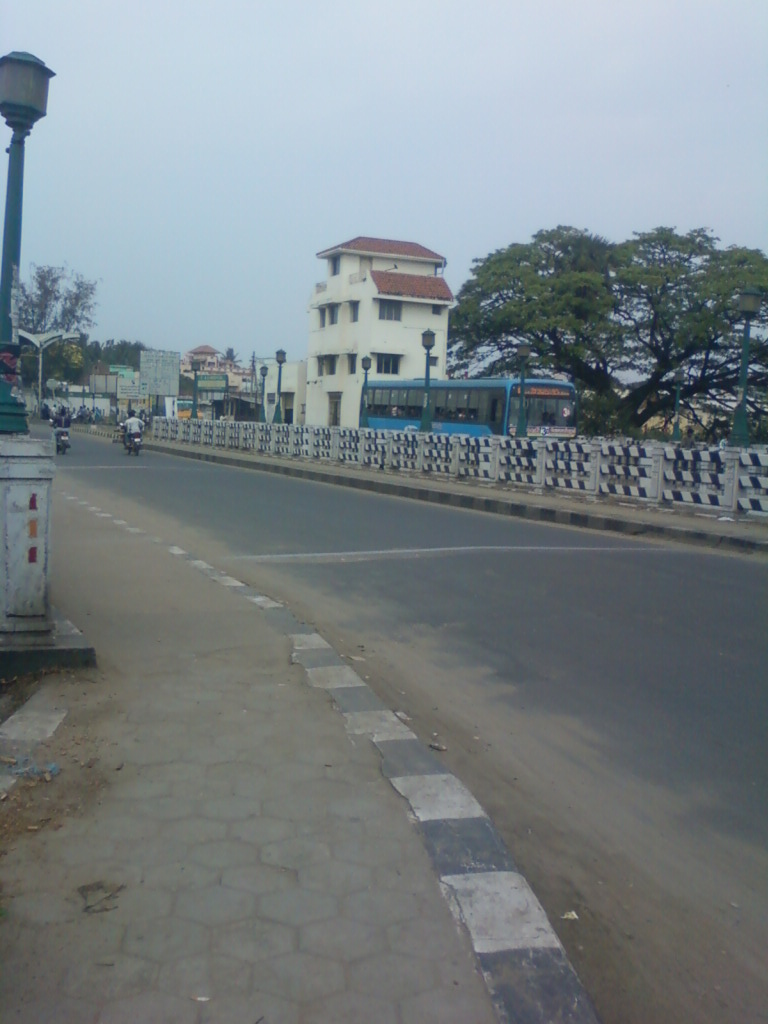
Aathupalam Bridge over the Noyyal

The first section also included the construction of a new 32.2m bridge over the Noyyal, at Aathupalam, with a toll period of 21 years, until 2018. The toll booth was India's earliest to use the International Road Dynamics iToll tolling system. In 2000, L&T asked the government for permission to regulate users of the bridge, and agreed to the subsidised toll rate of ₹ 50 per day per bus of the Tamil Nadu State Transport Corporation irrespective of the number of trips made by the bus. L&T subsequently stopped collection of toll from vehicles bearing local number plates. Part of the revenue from the toll booth funds a railway bridge and underpass at Chettipalaym.

== Sathyamangalam–Pollachi ==
The National Highways Authority of India has invited feasibility studies to upgrade National Highways 948 and 83 (formerly National Highway 209) connecting Pollachi and Bannari passing through the city. In 2009, the National Highways Authority of India sanctioned funds for widening the existing highway passing through the city which included construction of a new rail-over-bridge at Ganapathy. However, funds were withdrawn after the agency decided to execute future projects under a public–private partnership.

Due to withdrawal of funds from the National Highways Authority of India, the Highways and Minor Ports Department of the State Government has taken up upgradation works on the two connecting roads. In 2010, during the World Classical Tamil Conference 2010, the then Chief Minister of Tamil Nadu, M. Karunanidhi announced the construction of a three-tier flyover at Gandhipuram at a cost of ₹ 1.48 billion, to be completed over a period of two years. It would start from the Central Bus Station and end at the Corporation built Omni Bus Station on Sathyamangalam Road. The project also includes a four-lane underpass from the 100 Feet road junction to Nava India junction, four-lane up connecting the City Bus Station, State Express Transport Corporation (SETC) Bus Station, Central Bus Station and the proposed bus station on Sathyamangalam Road. At a length of 1.2 km, the flyover will cover both the junctions. The cost was later brought down to ₹ 1 billion, and the flyover construction was to have started in January 2011. The project met with many protests by Hindu Munnani activists who protested the demolition of four temples along Sathyamanagalam Road and Dr. Nanjappa Road. In 2012, the Member of Parliament representing Coimbatore, P. R. Natarajan, stated that the project was not practical and demanded changes in its design.

In 2011, the Chief Minister of Tamil Nadu announced the construction of two new flyovers at Ukkadam and Athupalam to help decongest the Palakkad Road.

== Mettupalayam–Sulur ==
The National Highways Authority of India is conducting studies for a bypass along the Mettupalayam–Sulur National Highways 81 and 181 (formerly National Highway 67). The proposed length of this road is 53.95 kilometres (33.52 mi), and is expected to cost ₹ 6.01 billion to build. The project was met with protests from farmers who claim that the project passes through fertile land and demanded re-alignment of the road. M R Sivasamy, the president of Tamizhaga Vivasayigal Sangham, demanded that the proposed road to be rerouted to start from Neelambur, and run through Vellanaipatty, Kallipalayam, Kunnathur, Kattampatty, Kuppepalayam, Sikkarampalayam and Odanthurai to reach Mettupalayam. The project has drawn ire from the public who are opposed to paying toll and feel that the wetlands in Sulur would be destroyed. From Sulur, the width of the road is 10 metres, with one-metre hard way on either side, while 30-km of the road, covering important towns, is four-lane, and the remaining, two-lane till Karur.

In 2013, the NHAI announced that it was withdrawing from the project due to lack of support from the state government. In 2014, the NHAi handed over the section back to the State Government for maintenance and upkeep. As per the update on 31 January 2015, NHAI stated on their website that this project was still under implementation in NHDP PhaseIIIA. The same had been removed as per the update on 31 July 2016.

== Western Bypass ==
In 2010, an announcement was made in the State Budget to build a Western Ring Road at a cost of ₹ 2.84 billion for 26 km. The proposed road would have been from Madukarai near ACC Cement industry, starting on Palakkad Road connecting Mettupalayam Road via Perur Road, Marudamalai Road (Bharatiyar University) and Thadagam Road (Kanuvai).

In 2011, the Government of Tamil Nadu and the Highways and Minor Ports Department announced the construction of a 26-kilometre (16 mi) long Western Bypass from Kuniamuthur to Thudiyalur. The road would help connect people going from Madukarai, and Palakkad to Marudamalai, Thadagam, Thudiyalur and Anaikatti. The proposed road would be 45 metres (148 ft) wide with paved shoulders on both sides and would cost ₹ 1.3 billion to build. In May 2012, the Highways Department and Local Planning Authority announced that a freeze had been imposed to prevent new land approvals in the area as land acquisition for the road construction was to begin soon. Residents of Thudiyalur opposed the road as it required demolition of their homes. The following November, it was announced that the road would terminate at Narasimhanaickenpalayam instead of Thudiyalur to minimise acquisition of land.

In 2012, the government finally decided to abandon the project in favour of an eastern road that connected Mettupalayam Road with Avinashi Road and the existing L&T bypass. In 2014, the department changed the road design again. The proposal was that the road would terminate at Narasimanaickenpalayam instead of Thudiyalur. On both occasions, officials said they were changing the design to reduce private land acquisition.

In 2021, land acquisition process started. So far (till July 2021) 50 percent of land acquisition has been completed and road construction will start after 80 percent of land acquisition is done. The total work was divided into three phases, and the government has released 171 crore Rs for the first phase of acquisition and construction.

== Eastern Bypass ==
There has been a request for a long time from Coimbatore people and industrial organizations to implement complete outer ring road in Coimbatore to reduce the city traffic and improve industrial and commercial transportation connectivity. The request is to expand the L&T Bypass and connect it to Neelambur and implement a new ring road from Neelambur to Narasimhanaickenpalayam,

In 2021, the Tamil Nadu government took this request to the central government to implement an eastern ring road from Karanampettai to Narasimhanaickenpalayam.

== See also ==
- Chennai Bypass Road
- Coimbatore BRTS
- Transport in Coimbatore
