= Singanallur =

Coimbatore, Tamil Nadu, India

- Neighbourhood
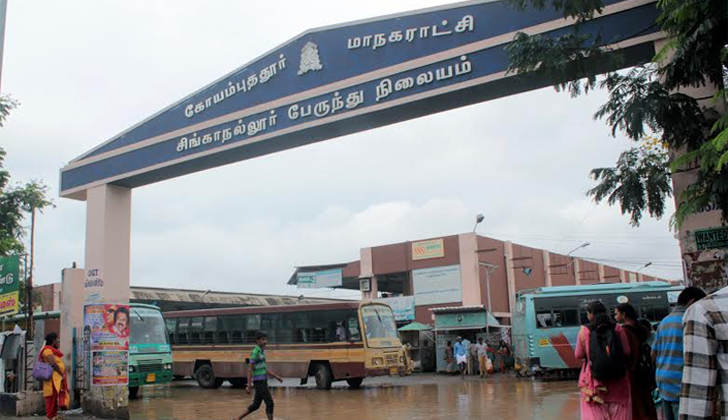

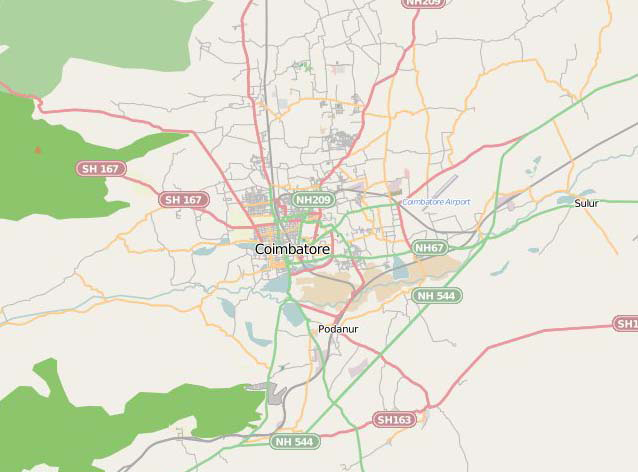
- Location in Coimbatote Location in Tamil Nadu
- Coordinates: 11.004230°N 77.024323°E
- Country: India
- State: Tamil Nadu
- District: Coimbatore
- Metro: Coimbatore
- Zone: Coimbatore East

Area
  - Total: 25 km^{2} (9.7 sq mi)
- Elevation: 411 m (1,348 ft)

Languages
  - Official: Tamil
- Time zone: UTC+5:30 (IST)
- PIN: 641005,641015
- Telephone code: 91–422
- Vehicle registration: TN-37
- Lok Sabha constituency: Coimbatore
- Vidhan Sabha constituency: Singanallur

Singanallur is a major residential locality of the city of Coimbatore in Tamil Nadu, India. It is located on the banks of Noyyal river, which runs to the southern boundary of the locality. It is situated in the eastern part of the city, and is a major hub for the inter-city bus services towards Southern and Central districts of Tamilnadu from the city. It is one of the well developed neighborhoods in the city and has been part of Coimbatore Corporation since 1981. The East Zone Office of Coimbatore City Municipal Corporation is located at Singanallur.

== Etymology ==
According to the Chola poorva pattayam, the name "Singanallur" is derived from the name of a Chola queen "Singarammal", mother of Karikala Chola in 2nd century AD and the village being donated as "Chadurvedi Mangalam" by the emperor to the priestly class.

== History ==
Singanallur Municipality was merged with Coimbatore Municipality to form the Coimbatore Municipal Corporation in 1982. Singanallur Municipality covered the localities such as Singanallur, SIHS Colony, Neelikonampalayam, Peelamedu, Uppilipalayam, Kallimadai and Ondipudur until the merger with Coimbatore Municipality in 1982 with a population of over 2.75 lakhs (as per 1981 census).Singanallur is one of the main happening hubs in Coimbatore.

== Geography ==
Singanallur is located at a distance of 9 km from the centre of the city, Townhall.The nerve centre of Singanallur is Trichy Road. This road passes through the centre point of Singanallur. Other major roads include Kamarajar Road, Neelikonampalayam Road, Vellalore Road and Masakalipalayam Road. It is located about 9.5 km from Townhall, the centre of the city, 7 km from the Coimbatore International Airport and about 8 km from City railway station, 9 km from Gandhipuram Central Bus Terminus and 10 km from Podanur railway station and is well connected to local bus services to various parts of the city. Singanallur shares its border with Ramanathapuram, Ondipudur, Vellalore, Uppilipalayam, Masakalipalayam, Varadharajapuram, Neelikonampalayam, Kallimadai, Nanjundapuram and SIHS Colony.

== Infrastructure ==
=== Trichy Road Flyover ===
The Trichy Road Flyover is opened in 2022 between Kallimadai to Sungam.

=== Singanallur Flyover ===
A four-lane flyover is proposed in Singanallur to avoid traffic congestion.

=== Singanallur-Vellalore Road Flyover ===
A two-lane flyover was opened in 2015 to avoid traffic congestion, caused by railway line between Irugur Junction and Podanur Junction.

== Locality ==
Singanallur is one of the well connected and well developed localities in Coimbatore.

=== Major religious spots ===
- Ulagalandha Perumal Temple built by Karikala
- Pudu Raja Temple
- Singanallur Masjid
- Mariamman Temple
- Aravan Temple
- Plague Mariamman Temple
- Csi Immanuel Church Singanallur
- Old ERS Church
- Muthumariamman Temple
- Badrakaliamman Temple
- Bhajanai temple
- Chellandi Amman Temple

=== Landmarks ===
- Singanallur Bus Terminus
- ESIC Medical College, Coimbatore
- Farmers Market
- Coimbatore City Municipal Corporation East Zone Office
- Coimbatore City Boat House
- Singanallur Railway Station
- Shanthi Social Services
- Singanallur Urban Health Care Centre

=== Schools ===
- Perks Matriculation School
- Venkatalaxmi Matriculation School
- SSVM World School
- Sri Jayendra Saraswathy Vidyalaya Senior Secondary School
- St Joseph's School
- Annai Velankanni Matriculation Higher Secondary School
- Thiyagi.N.G.Ramaswamy Memorial Higher Secondary School

=== Hospitals ===
- ESIC Medical College, Coimbatore
- NG Hospital
- Muthus Hospital
- Child Care Hospital
- Coimbatore Corporation Homeopathy Hospital
- VGM Hospital
- Ortho One Hospital
- Shanthi Social Service Hospital

== Singanallur Lake ==
Singanallur Lake is a lake in Singanallur, Coimbatore, South India and is recognised as a biodiversity conservation zone in 2013 by the city corporation. It is spread over an area of 1.153 km^{2} (0.445 sq mi) and has an average depth of 4.25 m (13.9 ft). It is one of the 9 large lakes in the city. A new variety of butterfly was named after Singanallur as Singanallurensis.

== Transport ==
=== Singanallur Mofussil Bus Terminus ===
Singanallur Bus Terminus, one of the major bus terminus in the city is located here. It handles buses towards:

- Moffussil buses towards Dharapuram, Madurai, Theni, Tiruchirappalli, Nagercoil, Kumbakonam, and Rameswaram.

Singanallur has easy access to :

- Gandhipuram : Via Kamarajar Road and Avinashi Road
- Coimbatore Integrated Bus Terminus : Via Vellalore Road
- Ukkadam : Via Western Trichy Road and Sungam Bypass Road
- Railway Station : Via Western Trichy Road
- Coimbatore International Airport : Via Singanallur - Aerodrome Road

=== Coimbatore Metro ===
Coimbatore Metro feasibility study is completed and one of the route planned from Karanampettai to Thaneerpandal via Singanallur covering 42 km.

== Politics ==
The locality of Singanallur is a part of Singanallur Assembly constituency and Coimbatore (Lok Sabha constituency).
