= Arulmigu Munthi Vinayagar Temple =

Historic Hindu temple in Coimbatore, Tamil Nadu, India

- அருள்மிகு முந்தி விநாயகர் திருக்கோயில்
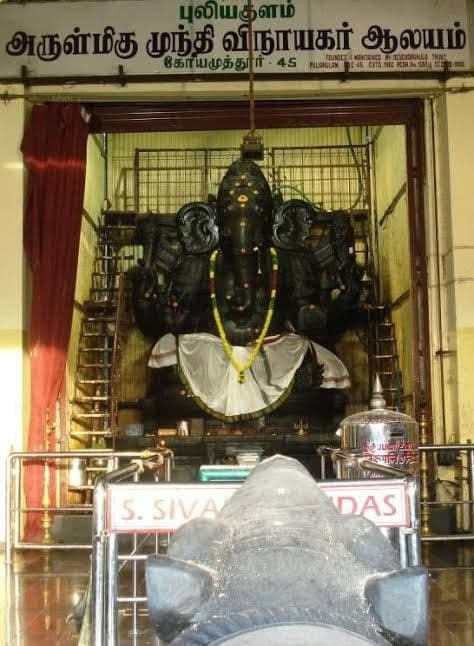

Religion
- Affiliation: Hinduism
- District: Coimbatore
- Deity: Munthi Vinayagar
- Festival: Vinayagar Chathuthi
- Governing body: Hindu Religious and Charitable Endowments Department

Location
- Location: Puliakulam, Coimbatore
- State: Tamil Nadu
- Country: India
- Interactive map of Arulmigu Munthi Vinayagar Temple
- Coordinates: 11°00′15.2″N 76°59′34.8″E

Architecture
- Type: Dravidian architecture
- Elevation: 411 m (1,348 ft)

Arulmigu Munthi Vinayagar Temple, is a Hindu temple located in the neighbourhood of Puliakulam in Coimbatore, Tamil Nadu, India. It is dedicated to the god Munthi Vinayagar, a form of Ganesha. The temple holds the largest Vinayagar idol in the entire Asian Continent.

== History ==
The Vinayagar shrine was a sub-temple of the Puliakulam Mariamman temple. The present temple was opened in 1982

== Idol ==
The idol is the largest Vinayagar statue in the entire Asian Continent. The statue was made out of a huge granite rock at Uthukuli. The statue is 19 feet high and weighs about 190 tonnes.

== Ganesh Chathurthi Festival ==
The Ganesh Chathurthi Festival is celebrated every year since 1982, in a grandeur manner.

== Connections ==
Arulmigu Munthi Vinayagar Temple has easy access to :

- Gandhipuram : Via Bharathiyar Road
- Coimbatore Integrated Bus Terminus : Via Ramanathapuram Road and Chettipalayam Road
- Ukkadam : Via Puliakulam-Redfields Road and Sungam Bypass Road
- Singanallur Bus Terminus : Via Eastern Trichy Road
- Railway Station : Via Puliakulam-Redfields Road and Racecourse
- Coimbatore International Airport : Via Eastern Avinashi Road
