= Puliakulam =

Coimbatore, Tamil Nadu, INDIA

- Neighbourhood
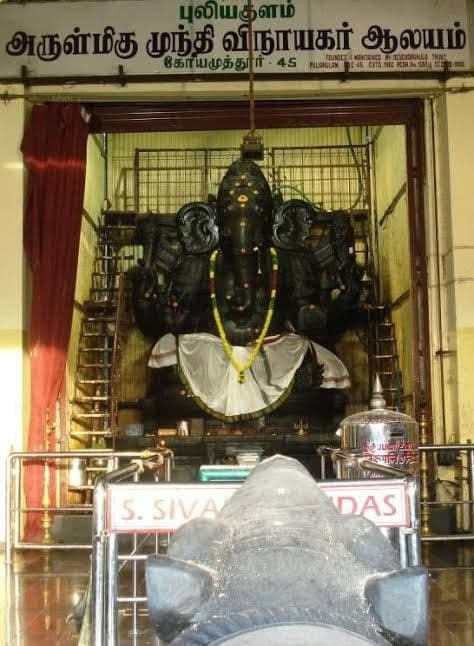
- View of Puliakulam Vinayagar Temple

- Location in Tamil Nadu, India
- Coordinates: 11.2°N 77.4°E
- Country: India
- State: Tamil Nadu
- District: coimbatore
- Elevation: 411 m (1,348 ft)

Languages
  - Official: Tamil
- Time zone: UTC+5:30 (IST)
- PIN: 641045
- Telephone code: 0422
- Vehicle registration: TN-66
- Lok Sabha constituency: Coimbatore
- Vidhan Sabha constituency: Coimbatore South (State Assembly Constituency)

Puliakulam is a residential neighborhood in the city of Coimbatore. The Idol in Puliakulam Vinayagar Temple is one of the largest monolithic(Single stoned) statues and the largest Ganesha idol in Asia . The Temple is Situated in the middle of the Four road Junction and also acts as a roundabout for the Vehicles to pass by. The idol is placed facing the East towards the Puliakulam to Sowripalayam road.

== Geography ==
Puliakulam is situated just 4 km from the heart of city (Townhall and Gandhipuram), and only 3 km to Coimbatore Junction and 8.5 km to Coimbatore Airport. It borders with Papanaiken palayam in the North, Meena Estate in the East, Ramanathapuram in the South and Race course in the West. The two national highways NH 544 (Avinashi road) and NH 81 (Trichy road) are just 0.5 km away on either side, which are connected by SH 162 which runs between Coimbatore North and Chettipalayam.

== Politics ==
Puliakulam comes under ward number 66 and 70 in the Coimbatore Corporation and comes under Coimbatore South (State Assembly Constituency).

== Culture ==
Being one of the oldest settlements of the city, this village of old Puliakulam is very well-ordered. The people belong to 12 different Kula Theivams having separate temples for each one of them, where the festivals are celebrated in the month of August (Tamil month of Aadi). There is also a temple for the primary deity of the village "Mariamman". The old martial arts of Wrestling and Silambam are still practiced and performed.

=== Weekly Tuesday Market ===
Beyond the Temple, Puliakulam is also known for its weekly Tuesday market, locally called the "Santhai" or "Sevai Santhai", held on Tuesdays alongside special worship services at saint Antony's Shrine, the market attracts pilgrims and visitors from across the city and surrounding areas. Numerous stalls offer a variety of goods, including vegetables, fruits, textiles, food, toys and accessories. the large crowds can can cause traffic congestion in nearby streets, with local volunteers and neighbourhood residents helping to manage the flow of traffic.

== Economy ==
Most of the population living here is working class. Companies include:

- The Times of India

== Locality ==
=== Major religious Spots ===
- Puliakulam Vinayagar Temple

== Transport ==
=== Air ===
- Coimbatore International Airport - 11 km.
  - via Avinashi Road and Aerodrome Road
- Sulur Air Force Station - 19.4 km
  - via Ramanathapuram and NH 81

=== Rail ===
- Coimbatore Railway Junction - 4 km
  - via Western Trichy Road
- Coimbatore North Railway Junction - 5.5 km
  - via Pappanaickenpalayam, Bharathiyar Road and Cross-Cut Road
- Podanur Railway Junction - 5km
  - via Nanjundapuram Road

=== Road ===
Puliakulam is very well connected by road. The local auto rickshaws support during the day and night hours. The bus transport is available from 4am to 11 pm. The common bus route to reach this place is through bus numbers 5, 5C, 7, 7C, 22, 23A, 61, 95A, S2, S3, S4, S13, S26. It has easy access to

- Singanallur Bus Terminus - 5.4 km
  - via Sowripalayam, Uppilipalayam, Varadharajapuram and Kamarajar Road
- Gandhipuram Central Bus Terminus - 4.4 km
  - via Pappanaickenpalayam and Bharathiyar Road or
  - via Avinashi Road and Park Gate Road
- Ukkadam Bus Terminus - 4.6 km
  - via Western Trichy Road and Sungam Bypass Road
- Mettupalayam Road Bus Terminus - 21.5 km
  - via Race Course, Dr Krishnasamy Mudaliyar Road and NH 181
- Coimbatore Integrated Bus Terminus - 9.1 km
  - via Western Trichy Road, Singanallur and Vellalore Road
