= Trichy Road Flyover =

Overpass bridge in Tiruchirapalli, India

Trichy Road Flyover Flyover
- திருச்சி சாலை மேம்பாலம் Ramanathapuram-Sungam flyover

Location
- Coimbatore, India
- Roads at junction: Trichy road Sungam Bypass Road

Construction
- Type: Overpass Flyover
- Lanes: 4
- Opened: 11 June 2022

Trichy road Flyover also known as Ramanathapuram-Sungam flyover is a 3.15 km long flyover in the city of Coimbatore. It is designed for vehicles to bypass the Sungam and Ramanathapuram Junctions to move towards Ukkadam, Townhall in the west and Singanallur and Coimbatore International Airport in the east. It was opened on 11 June 2022. and executed by the Divisional Engineer Highways, Dr.V SAMUTHIRAKANI M.E., Ph.D

== Background ==
The foundation stone for the flyover was laid in 2019. The flyover is built to reduce the traffic congestion caused in Trichy road. The flyover is planned to reduce traffic congestion in Ramanathapuram Junction and Sungam Junction.

== Planning ==
The flyover is a four-laned overpass flyover bypassing the Ramanathapuram junction and Sungam junctions. Totally 119 pillars are for structural support. The flyover begins near Rainbow Colony and ends near the Coimbatore Stock Exchange in Trichy road. The flyover will have a dedicated exit ramp towards the Sungam Bypass Road to commute towards Ukkadam.

== Construction ==
The flyover is 3.2 km long and 17.2 metres wide. It was constructed at a cost of ₹ 232 crore and inaugurated on 11 June 2022. The initial construction started in 2019 and it was delayed in 2020 due to COVID-19 pandemic and accelerated in June 2020. In curved portions, high containment barriers have been provided.

== Decorations ==
Two pillars of the flyover were decorated with paintings of former Indian President APJ Abdul Kalam and freedom fighter VO Chidambaranar by digital painting method initially. It is also planned to paint the other pillars with the theme representing Coimbatore city.

== See also ==
- Flyovers in Coimbatore
- Avinashi Road Expressway, Coimbatore
- Transport in Coimbatore
- Trichy road
- NH 81
