= Valankulam Lake =

Lake in India

Coordinates: 10°59′30.1″N 76°58′19.8″E

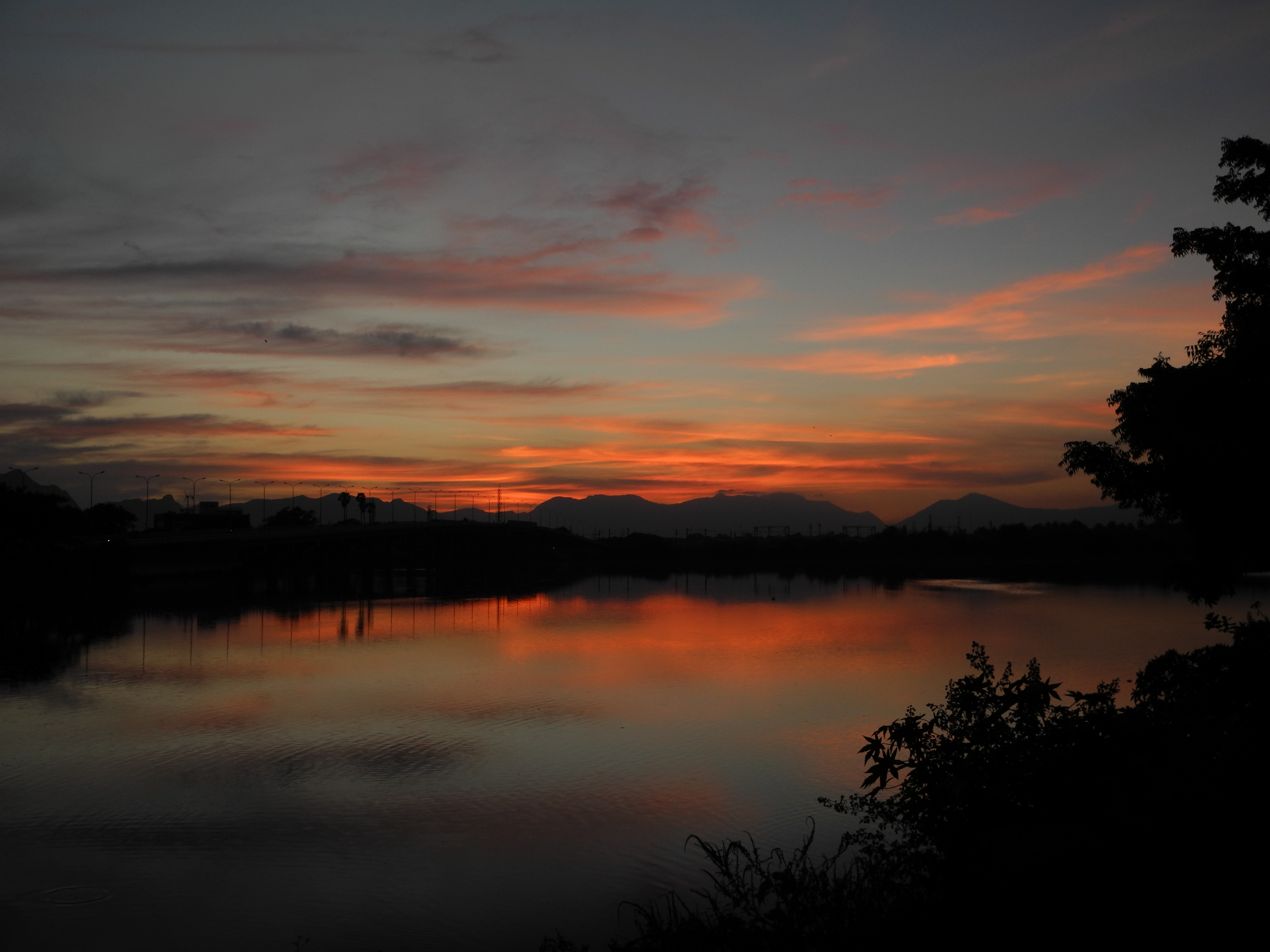
Valankulam Lake at Sunset

Valankulam Lake is one of the lakes in Coimbatore, South India. It is situated between Trichy Road and Sungam bypass road connecting with Ukkadam A railway track connecting Coimbatore Junction and Podanur passes over the lake. Various birds including little grebes and purple moorhen can be seen in this lake.
