= Ramanathapuram, Coimbatore =

Coimbatore, Tamil Nadu, India

Ramanathapuram
- Neighbourhood
- Location in Tamil Nadu, IndiaIndial
- Coordinates: 10.989900°N 76.985512°E
- Country: India
- State: Tamil Nadu
- District: Coimbatore
- Metro: Coimbatore
- Zone: Coimbatore Central

Area
  - Total: 9 km^{2} (3.5 sq mi)
- Elevation: 411 m (1,348 ft)

Languages
  - Official: Tamil
- Time zone: UTC+5:30 (IST)
- PIN: 641045
- Telephone code: 91–422
- Vehicle registration: TN-66
- Lok Sabha constituency: Coimbatore
- Vidhan Sabha constituency: Singanallur (partial), Coimbatore South (partial)

Ramanathapuram is a locality in Coimbatore city on the south eastern part of the city. It is one of the well developed neighborhoods in the city and has been part of Coimbatore Corporation since 1882.

== Geography ==
The nerve centre of Ramanathapuram is Trichy Road. This road passes through the centre point of Ramanathapuram. Other major roads include Puliakulam Road, Nanjundapuram Road, Sowripalayam Road, 80 Feet Road and Sungam Bypass Road. It is located about 4.6 km from Townhall, the centre of the city, 9.9 km from the Coimbatore International Airport and about 4.1 km from City railway station, 5 km from Gandhipuram Central Bus Terminus and 8.7 km from Coimbatore Integrated Bus Terminus and 4.6 km from Podanur railway station and is well connected to local bus services to various parts of the city. Ramanathapuram shares its border with Town Hall, Singanallur, Puliakulam, Ukkadam, Racecourse, Sowripalayam and Nanjundapuram.

== Infrastructure ==
The Trichy Road Flyover is under construction, to reduce the traffic congestion by bypassing Ramanathapuram and Sungam junctions.

== Locality ==
Ramanathapuram is one of the well connected localities in Coimbatore and has several educational, commercial and business establishments.

=== Schools ===
Schools like

- Carmel Garden School
- Alvernia Matriculation School
- Trinity Matriculation School
- Yellow Train Nursery school
- Vivekalaya International School

are schools located in and near Ramanathapuram.

=== Hospital ===
- NM Hospital
- Manu Hospital
- Gem Hospital
- Bala Hospital
- Arthy Hospital

=== Shops ===
- Max
- Titan
- Unlimited
- Jockey

=== Business ===
Business Establishments like G.K. Industries, Ramani Realtors Private Limited and Angler technologies are located in Ramanathapuram.

== Transport ==
The nearest railway station to Ramanathapuram is the Coimbatore Junction All the town buses from and Ukkadam to the south-eastern suburbs along the Trichy Road pass through Ramanathapuram. Ramanathapuram has easy access to :

- Townhall : Via western Trichy Road
- Gandhipuram : Via Puliakulam Road
- Coimbatore Integrated Bus Terminus : Via Nanjundapuram Road
- Singanallur : Via Eastern Trichy Road
- Railway Station : Via Western Trichy Road
- Coimbatore International Airport : Via Puliakulam Road and Eastern Avinashi Road

== Politics ==
The locality of Ramanathapuram is a part of Coimbatore South (State Assembly Constituency) partially and Singanallur (state assembly constituency) partially. Also the locality is a part of Coimbatore (Lok Sabha constituency).

== Coimbatore Metro ==
Coimbatore Metro feasibility study is completed and one of the route planned from Karanampettai to Thaneerpandal via Ramanathapuram covering 42 km.
