= Kamarajar Road, Coimbatore =

Important Arterial Road in Coimbatore, Tamilnadu, India

Kamarajar Road
- Maintained by: Highways of Tamil Nadu; Coimbatore City Municipal Corporation
- Length: 3 km (1.9 mi)
- North end: Hope College, Coimbatore
- Major junctions: Avinashi Road/Tidel Park Road(Hope College); Manis Theatre Road(Manis Theatre); Neelikonampalayam Road/Masakalipalayam Road(Varadharajapuram); Trichy Road/Vellalore Road(Singanallur)
- South end: Singanallur, Coimbatore

Kamarajar Road is an arterial road in city of Coimbatore, Tamil Nadu, India. This road connects Singanallur and Hope College. It acts as a major link between Avinashi Road and Trichy Road, the two major arterial roads in Coimbatore city.

== Alignment ==
The road is a two lane road from Hope College to Singanallur.

== Bus terminals ==
The Singanallur Bus Terminus, one of the intercity bus terminals of Coimbatore city is located along the road.

== Places transversed ==
- Hope College
- Gandhipudur
- Uppilipalayam
- ESI
- Varadharajapuram
- Singanallur

== Major Landmarks on Kamarajar Road ==
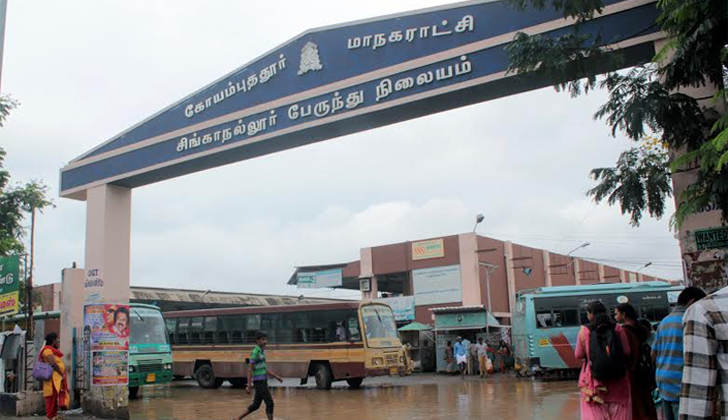
Singanallur Bus Terminus

- Singanallur Bus Terminus
- ESIC Medical College

=== Major Hotels ===
- O by Tamara
- Hotel Park Avenue Suites
- Fab Hotels Theejas

=== Cinemas ===
- Manis Theatre

=== Major Restaurants ===
- Hotel Dindigul Thalapakkati
- Hotel RHR
- Renuga Cafe
- Kovai Royal Biriyani
- Biriyani Crush
- Hotel Sooryas
- Shri Laxmi Narayana
- Its Shawarma and Lazzi In
- Hotel Dharun Chettinadu
- Buhari Biriyani
- Kovai Grill

=== Educational institutions ===
- ESIC Medical College
- VIBGYOR School
- Gandhi Cenetary Memorial School
- KSG College of Arts and Science
- JK College of Nursing and Pharmaceuticals
- Thiyagi NGR Matric.Hr.Sec.School

=== Shopping ===
- D Mart, Varadharajapuram
- Robin's Hypermarket
- Farm corner

== Museum ==
- Kasthuribhai Gandhi Museum

=== Temple ===
- Sri Ulagalandha Perumal temple
- Sri Varadharaja Perumal Temple
- Mariyamman Temple
- Mahalakshmi Temple
