= Theneeswarar Temple =

- தேனீஸ்வரர் திருக்கோயில்
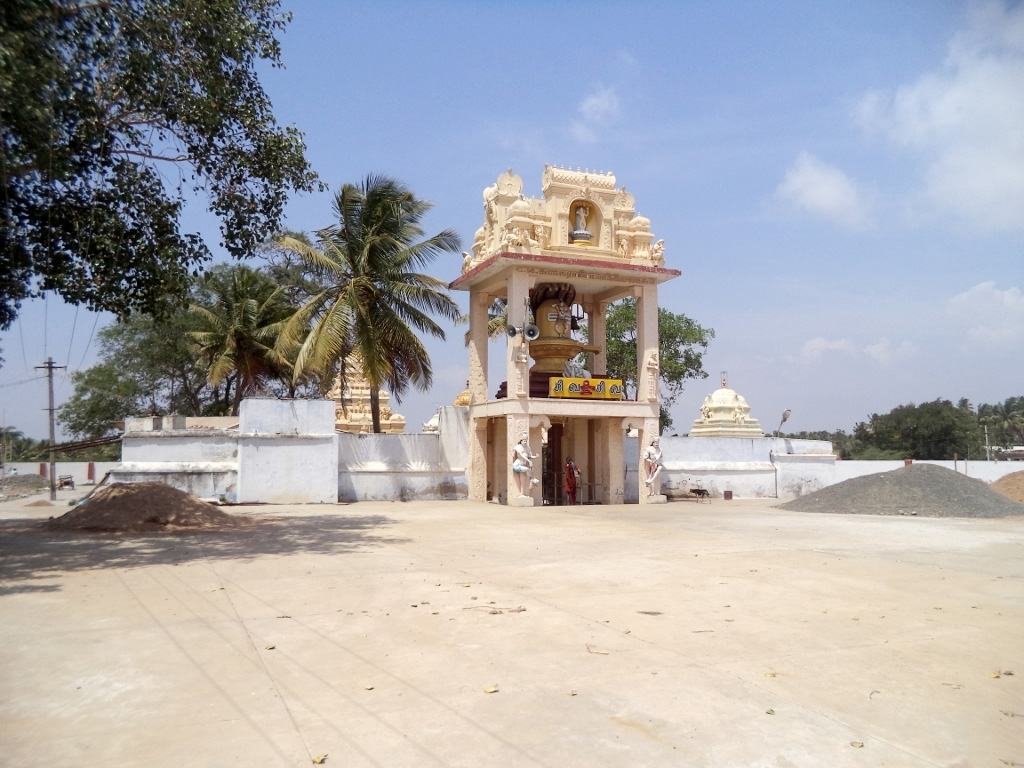
- Theneeswarar Temple entry

- Location in Tamil Nadu

Religion
- Affiliation: Hinduism
- Deity: Lord Siva (Shiva)

Location
- Location: Vellalore
- State: Tamil Nadu
- Country: India
- Interactive map of Theneeswarar Temple
- Coordinates: 10°58′33″N 76°54′53″E

Architecture
- Type: Dravidian architecture
- Completed: 1400 A.D.

Website
- http://www.vellalore.in/2013/10/theneeswarar-temple-entrance.html

The Theneeswarar Temple (Tamil: அருள்மிகு தேனீஸ்வரர் திருக்கோயில்) is a Hindu temple dedicated to Shiva located in Vellalore, near Coimbatore city in Coimbatore District, western part of Tamil Nadu in state of southeastern India. The temple is also referred as Sri Sivakama Sundari Ambal Samedha Sri Theneeswarar Temple.
