= Government Medical College & ESI Hospital, Coimbatore =

Indian Hospital and Medical College

Government Medical College and ESI Hospital
- Former names: ESIC Medical college and Hospital
- Type: Public
- Established: 2016; 10 years ago
- Affiliations: Tamil Nadu Dr. MGR Medical University, NMC
- Location: Kamarajar Road, Singanallur, Coimbatore, Tamil Nadu, 641015, India; 11°0′33.96″N 77°1′28.04″E
- Website: gmcesi.co.in

Government Medical College & ESI Hospital, is a government run medical college in Coimbatore, Tamil Nadu, India. It was established in 2016 under the aegis of the Employees' State Insurance Corporation, a central autonomous body under Ministry of Labour and Employment of Government of India. There is a 510-bedded tertiary care hospital attached to it. The institute has an annual intake of 100 students for undergraduate programme and five seats for postgraduate programme.
