= Nilakandaeshwarar Temple =

Religion
- Affiliation: Hinduism
- District: Coimbatore
- Deity: Lord Shiva

Location
- Location: Irugur
- State: Tamil Nadu
- Country: India

Architecture
- Completed: 433 AD

Nilakandaeshwarar Temple was constructed by Karikala Chola in 433 AD near Noyyal River in Irugur, Coimbatore, Tamil Nadu, India. The temple's main god was Shiva, along with Nanthi and Parvati.
