= Eachanari Vinayagar Temple =

Historical Vinayaga Temple in the City of Coimbatore Tamilnadu India

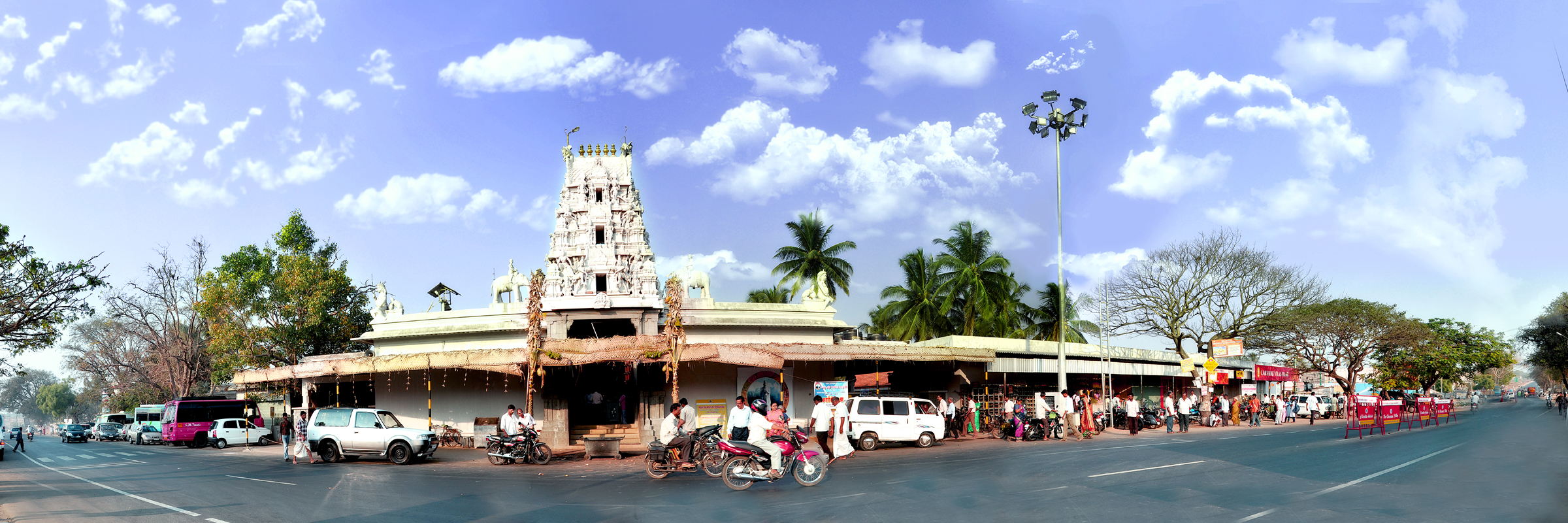
- Eachanari Temple

- Location in Tamil Nadu

Religion
- Affiliation: Hinduism
- Deity: Ganesha

Location
- Location: Coimbatore district
- State: Tamil Nadu
- Country: India
- Coordinates: 10°55′0″N 76°59′0″E

Architecture
- Type: Dravidian

Website
- www.eachanarivinayagar.tnhrce.in

Eachanari Vinayagar Temple is a temple dedicated to Hindu god Vinayagar, situated in the village Eachanari near Coimbatore, Tamil Nadu, India. The temple is situated about 12 km from the city of Coimbatore on NH 209.

== History ==
It is said that when the idol of Vinayaga measuring 6 feet high and 3 feet in diameter was being transported from Madurai in a cart for installation at Perur Pateeswarar Temple, the axle of the cart broke and it got seated in (eachanari) the place where the temple was constructed.
