= Eachanari =

Suburb of Coimbatore, Tamil Nadu, India

- suburb
- Location in Tamil Nadu, India
- Coordinates: 10.928910°N 76.984467°E
- Country: India
- State: Tamil Nadu
- District: Coimbatore

Languages
  - Official: Tamil
- Time zone: UTC+5:30 (IST)
- Postal code: 641021

Eachanari is a suburb of Coimbatore city in Tamil Nadu, India. The suburb and its environs are also home to the Eachanari Vinayagar Temple. It exists within the Coimbatore City Municipal Corporation jurisdiction.

== Geography ==
Eachanari is located about 1 km (0.62 mi) from the L&T Bypass Road and borders Sundarapuram, Myleripalayam, Kovaipudur and Vellalore.

== Transport ==
The Coimbatore Integrated Bus Terminus is located about 4 kilometres (2.5 mi) from Eachanari. The Ukkadam Bus Terminus is located about 8 km (5.0 mi) from Eachanari.

=== Eachanari Flyover ===
A flyover at Eachanari has been laid by the National Highways Authority of India (NHAI) in 2019, at the L&T Bypass signal junction, in order to reduce traffic congestion.

== Temples ==
Eachanari Vinayagar Temple is among 11 temples in the Coimbatore, India area. The temple, dedicated to Hindu god Vinayagar, is located about 12 kilometres (7.5 mi) from the city of Coimbatore on NH 209.

== Politics ==
Eachanari is a part of Kinathukadavu (state assembly constituency) and Pollachi (Lok Sabha constituency)
