= Victoria Town Hall, Coimbatore =

Victoria Town Hall
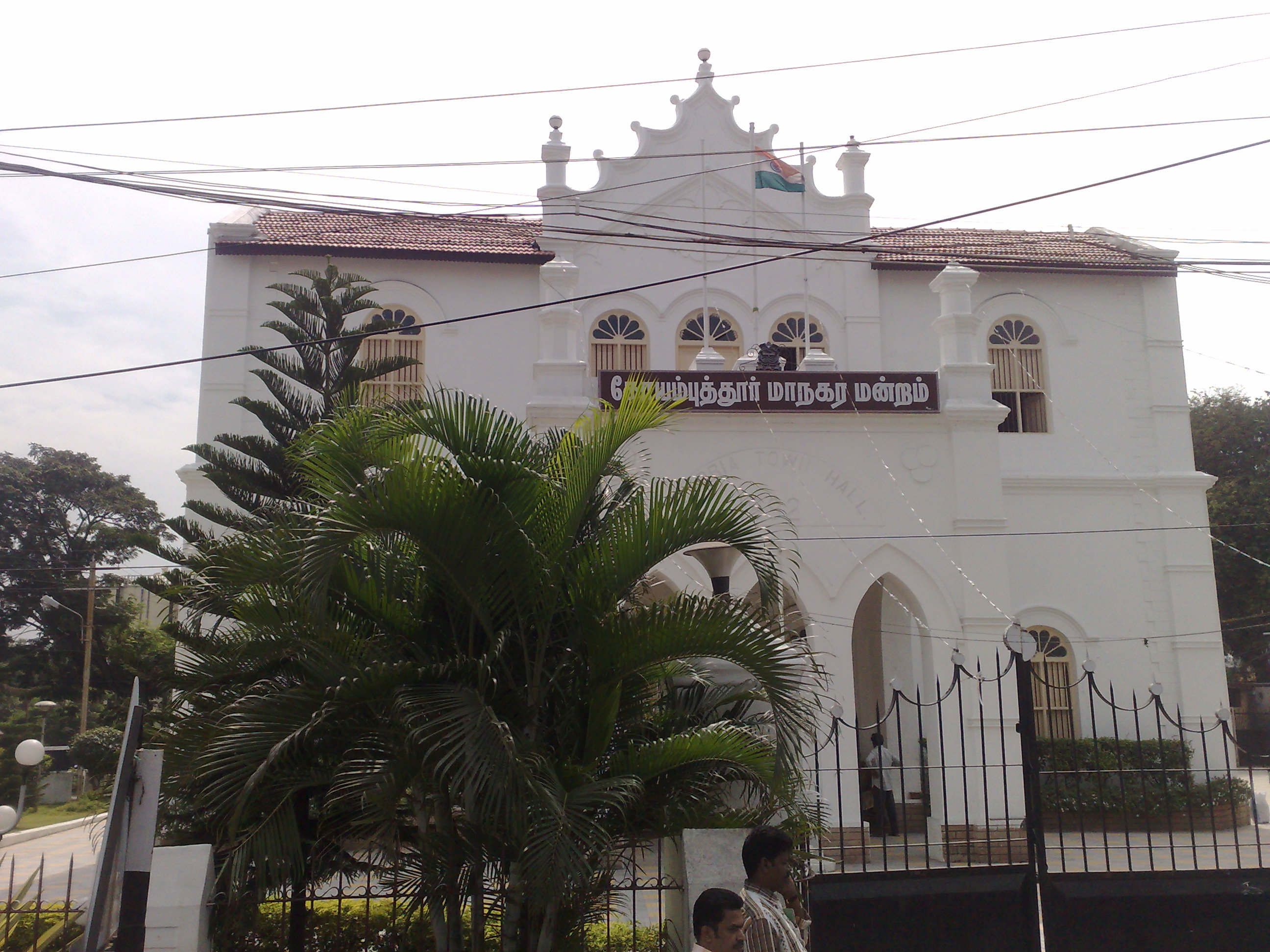
- Victoria Town Hall in 2008
- Interactive map of the Victoria Town Hall area

General information
- Type: Town hall
- Architectural style: Neoclassical architecture
- Location: Townhall, Coimbatore, India, Bazaar Street
- Coordinates: 10.99339°N 76.96108°E
- Inaugurated: 1892
- Renovated: 1992
- Cost: ₹10,000 (equivalent to ₹3.9 million or US$40,000 in 2023)
- Renovation cost: ₹1.5 million (equivalent to ₹12 million or US$120,000 in 2023)
- Owner: Coimbatore Municipal Corporation

Technical details
- Floor count: 2
- Floor area: 6,000 ft^{2} (560 m^{2})

Victoria Town Hall, is a neoclassical building in Coimbatore, India. It is situated in the central part of the city in the Townhall area, which was named after the building itself. It was built in 1892 and was originally named after Queen Victoria. Currently, the building is the seat of the Coimbatore Municipal Corporation.

== History ==
=== Planning and construction ===
In 1887, a group of people from the city led by S. P. Narasimhalu Naidu decided to build a structure to commemorate the 50th year of Queen Victoria's coronation. The municipality gave land for the building and allocated ₹3,000 (equivalent to ₹1.5 million or US$15,000 in 2023) for the construction. Apart from ₹1,000 (equivalent to ₹500,000 or US$5,200 in 2023) donated by Naidu, funding for the construction was raised from other members of the city council. The construction was completed in 1892 at a cost of ₹10,000 (equivalent to ₹3.9 million or US$40,000 in 2023).

=== Renovation ===
By the 1990s, the building became dilapidated due to aging, and the corporation issued an order to demolish the building in 1992. A group of activists led by the Indian National Trust for Art and Cultural Heritage and the Indian Chamber of Commerce and Industry launched a campaign to save the building. The campaign was eventually successful and the corporation agreed to renovate the building. The renovation was completed in the same year at an estimated cost of ₹1.5 million (equivalent to ₹12 million or US$120,000 in 2023). The building was painted and repaired for water seepage in 2014. It was further upgraded and renovated in 2022 to accommodate the larger number of councillors of the newly expanded corporation.

== Design ==
The building occupies a 48 acres (19 ha) plot and has a built-up area of 6,000 ft^{2} (560 m^{2}) including the 3,000 ft^{2} (280 m^{2}) hall which hosts the council. The building is built in neo-classical style with large timber roof trusses, stone walls plastered with lime mortar, and tiled roofs. The roof is constructed using red Mangalore tiles made of hard laterite clay. Large arches in Gothic style supported by Greek style columns lead to the foyer, which opens up to the main hall. The hall is flanked by corridors supported by large Tuscan style columns on three sides. The building has two floors with the wooden mezzanine floor housing the visitor galleries.

== Usage ==
The building is situated in the old market area, which later came to be known as townhall after the building itself. It was used as the venue for the meeting of the municipal council till 1953. The district central library was inaugurated in the building in 1952. It hosted the public library and reading room till 1986 on the mezzanine floor. It was also used for public meetings, religious sermons, exhibitions, banquets, and counting of votes during elections. It was used as a storage space from 1986 till the renovations in 1992. Since 1992, the building has hosted the corporation council.

== See also ==
- Bengaluru Town Hall
- Delhi Town Hall
- Kolkata Town Hall
- The Asiatic Society of Mumbai
- Victoria Public Hall, Chennai
