= Ondipudur =

Coimbatore, Tamil Nadu, India

- Neighbourhood
- Location in Tamil Nadu, IndiaIndial
- Coordinates: 11.006180°N 77.052719°E
- Country: India
- State: Tamil Nadu
- District: Coimbatore
- Metro: Coimbatore
- Zone: Coimbatore East

Area
  - Total: 9 km^{2} (3.5 sq mi)
- Elevation: 411 m (1,348 ft)

Languages
  - Official: Tamil
- Time zone: UTC+5:30 (IST)
- PIN: 641016
- Telephone code: 91–422
- Vehicle registration: TN-37
- Lok Sabha constituency: Coimbatore
- Vidhan Sabha constituency: Singanallur

Ondipudur is a major residential neighbourhood of the city of Coimbatore in Tamil Nadu, India. It is situated in the south-eastern part of the city. It is one of the well developed neighborhoods in the city and has been part of Coimbatore Corporation since 1981.

== Gallery ==
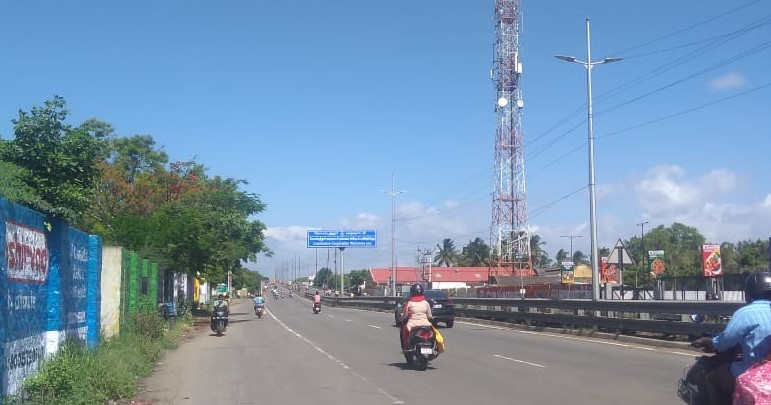
Trichy Road near Ondipudur Flyover

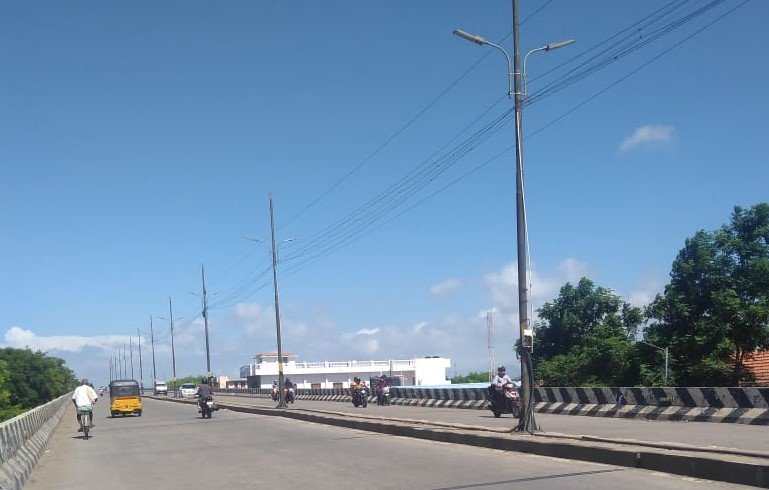
Ondipudur Flyover

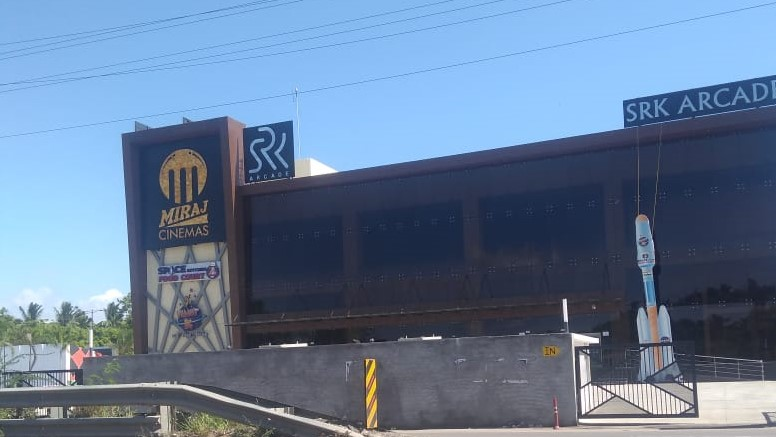
Miraj Cinemas, Ondipudur

== Geography ==
The nerve centre of Ondipudur is Trichy Road. This road passes through the nerve centre of Ondipudur. Other major roads include Irugur Road and Peedampalli Road. It is located about 7 km from the Coimbatore International Airport and about 11 km from City railway station,12 km from Gandhipuram Central Bus Terminus and 13 km from Podanur railway station and is well connected to local bus services to various parts of the city. Ondipudur shares its border with Singanallur, Vellalore, Irugur, Pallapalayam and SIHS Colony.

== Transport ==
Onidpudur lies along National Highway 81 (India) the Trichy Road one of the important arterial roads in the Coimbatore City.

== Sports ==
The Red Fort team was established in 1998. Since then, the team has played many matches in all formats and has won numerous trophies in internal tournaments. They also founded a social initiative, Helping Hands, to support people in need

== Ondipudur Flyover ==
The Ondipudur Flyover was constructed in 2006 as a four-lane flyover to ease traffic congestion in Trichy road caused by a railway line connecting Podanur Junction and Irugur bypassing the Coimbatore Junction.

== Coimbatore metro ==
Ondipudur is a part of the proposed Coimbatore metro metro corridor connecting Karanampettai and Thaneerpanthal.

== Schools ==
- C.R.R. Matric Higher Secondary School
- ST JOSEPHS MATRICULATION HR SEC SCHOOL
- Government Boys High School
- Government Girls High School
- Samskaara Academy

== Theatres ==
- Miraj Cinemas, Coimbatore

== Politics ==
The locality of Ondipudur is a part of Singanallur (state assembly constituency) and Coimbatore (Lok Sabha constituency).
