= Vellalore =

Vellalore வெள்ளலூர்
- suburb
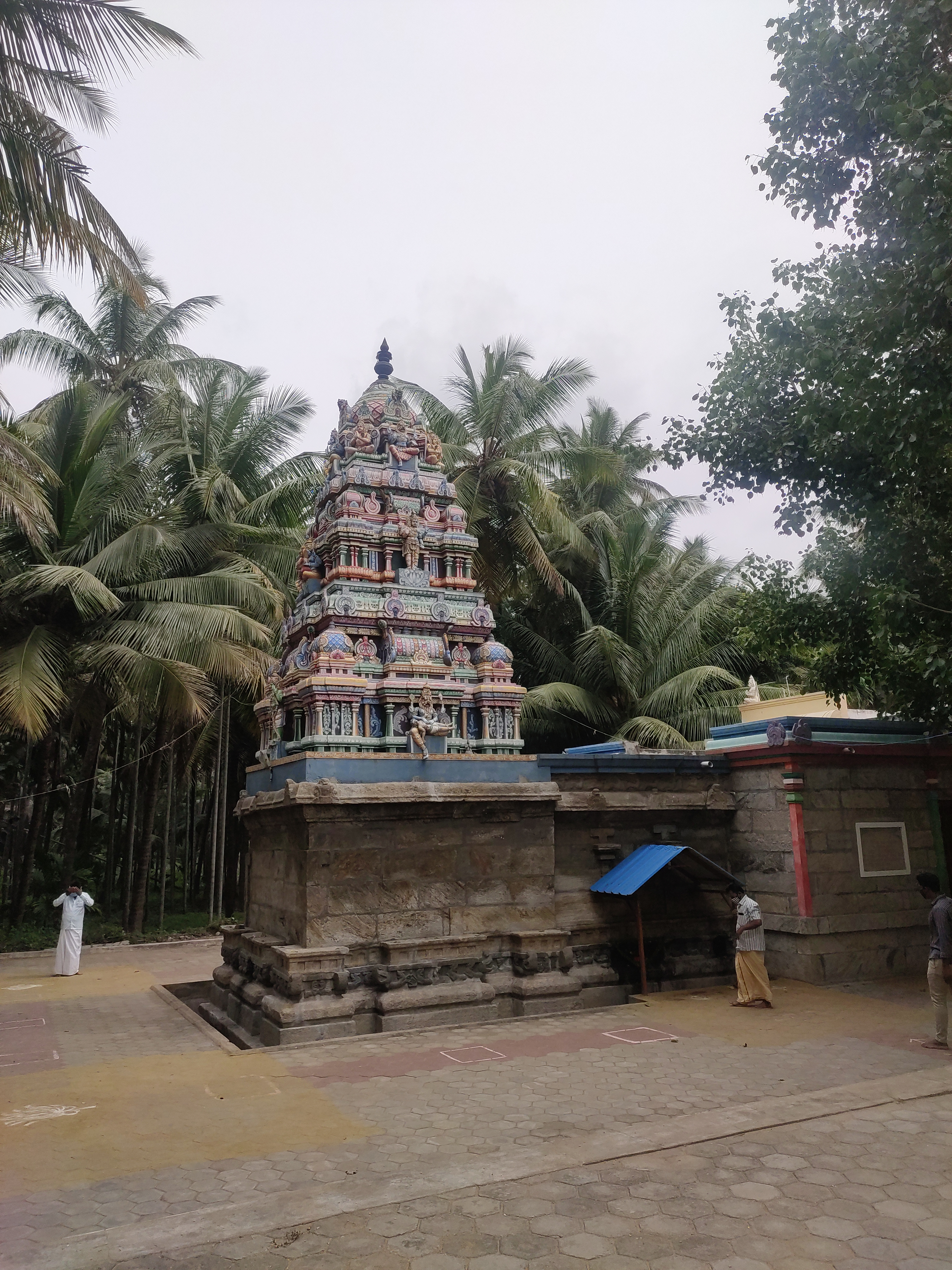
- Vellalore Karivaratharaja Perumal Temple Tower

- Location in Tamil Nadu, India
- Coordinates: 10.980450°N 77.031570°E
- Country: India
- State: Tamil Nadu
- Region: Kongu Nadu
- District: Coimbatore

Area
  - Total: 16.64 km^{2} (6.42 sq mi)

Population (2011)
  - Total: 24,872
  - Density: 1,495/km^{2} (3,871/sq mi)

Languages
  - Official: Tamil
- Time zone: UTC+5:30 (IST)
- PIN: 641111
- Telephone code: 0422 241
- Vehicle registration: TN 37
- Website: http://www.vellalore.in

Vellalore is a panchayat town in Coimbatore district in the Indian state of Tamil Nadu. It is a southern suburb of the city. It is at 12 km east of Townhall, the centre of the city Coimbatore. It is situated on the southern bank of Noyyal river.

== History ==
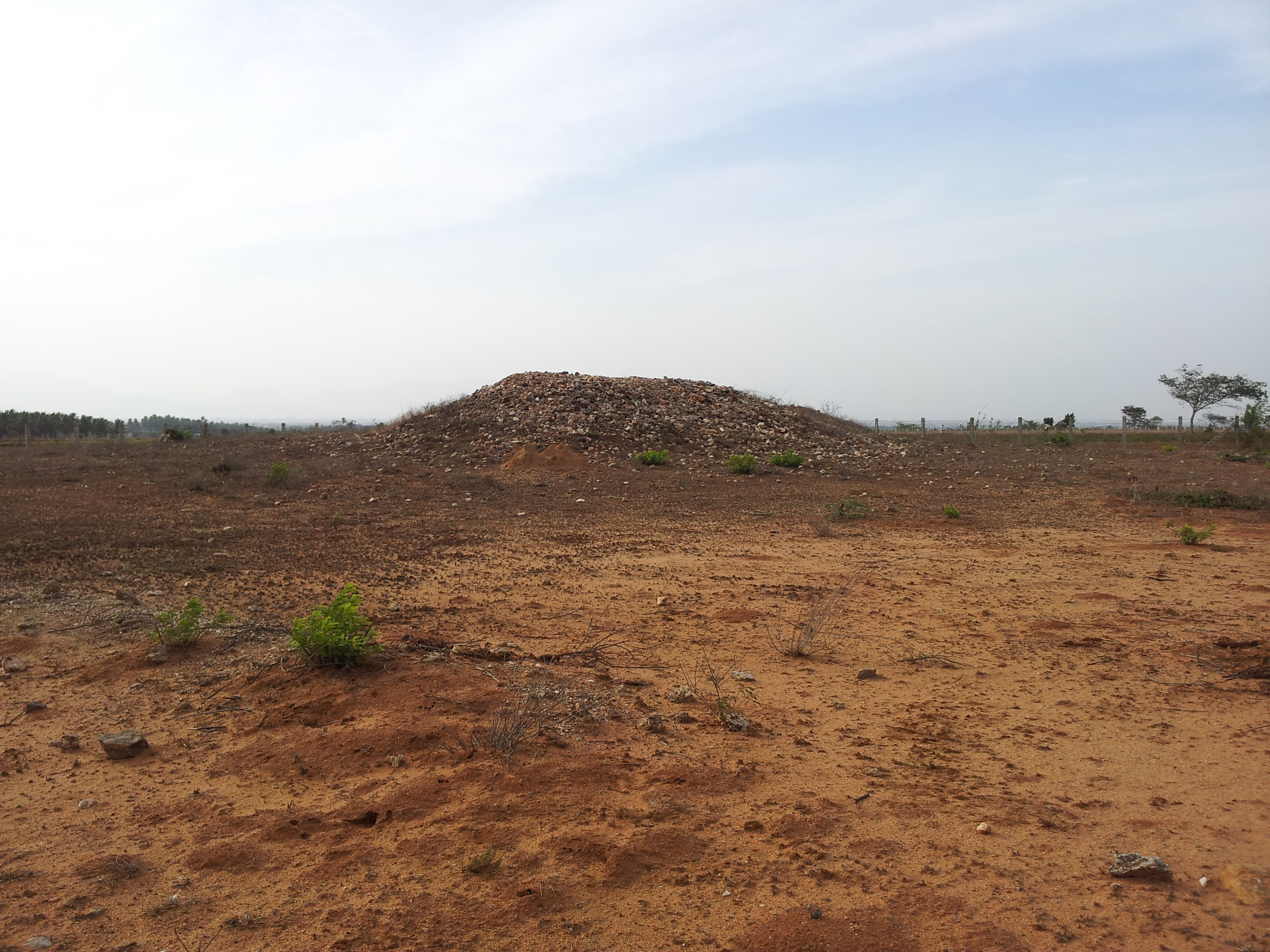
Kaadukuttai historic site

Vellalore or Vellalur, the ancient trade centre is located in the southern bank of the river Noyyal. It is ~60 km from Kodumanal. It is referred in the inscriptions of the Kongu chola as "Vellalur". However, in Cholan poorvapattayam mentioned as 'Velir' meaning chief of the clan was the ruler of this area. That might be one of the reason it is known after the name of the chief as 'vellalur'.

Black and red ware, Russet coated ware, Red slipped ware and Black ware sherds were collected along with the broken pieces of dishes, vases and parts of urn pieces were recovered here. Kadu Kuttai, a gravel mound, is a megalithic historic site in the area. Many hoards of Roman coins were discovered during the British period. In the year 1842 five hundred and twenty two coins, in 1891, five hundred and forty seven coins were collected. These gold and silver coins belongs in between 1st Century BCE to 4th-century CE. In addition, Roman ornaments were also found. Vellalore had trade links with the Roman Empire since 100 BC. The Tamil Nadu State Department of Archaeology excavated Roman coins in Vellalore in 2026.

Vellalore was one of the prominent towns in the era of Early Cholas. Karikala Chola built the Karivaradaraja perumal temple in 1 AD. During the medieval period Siva and Vishnu temples were constructed by the Chera and Kongu cholas. After the Kongu cholas, Vellalore slowly lost its historical importance.

== Geography ==
Vellalore has an average elevation of 411 m (1,348 ft). Vellalore is situated on the southern bank of Noyyal River. It shares its border with Podanur, Singanallur, Chettipalayam, Eachanari and Nanjundapuram.

=== Vellalore Lake ===
Vellalore Lake is a lake in Coimbatore, Tamil Nadu. It is one of the lakes in the Noyyal river irrigation network. The lake is spread over an area of 90 acres.

== Demographics ==
As of 2001 India census, Vellalore had a population of 17,294. Males constitute 50% of the population and females 50%. Vellalore has an average literacy rate of 64%, which is higher than the national average of 59.5%; male literacy is 70%, and female literacy is 59%. In Vellalore, 8% of the population is under 6 years of age.

== Local Body Elections ==
=== 2022 Tamil Nadu Local Body Elections ===
The 2022 Tamil Nadu Local Body Elections were conducted by the Tamil Nadu State Election Commission. Indirect election for the President and vice-president posts was postponed and later held on 26 March 2022, where AIADMK candidates were elected to those positions.

2022 election results by ward

==== Results ====
Party	Wards Won	Status
AIADMK	8	Ruling Party
DMK	6	Opposition
Independent	1	Opposition

Total wards: 15

=== 2011 Tamil Nadu Local Body Elections ===
The 2011 Tamil Nadu Local Body Elections were conducted by the Tamil Nadu State Election Commission.

2011 election results by ward

==== Results ====
Party	Wards Won	Status
AIADMK	11	Ruling Party
INC	3	Opposition
Independent	1	Opposition

Total wards: 15

== Administration ==
- Vellalore is administered by a Town Panchayat.
- It was planned to include Vellalore in the Coimbatore corporation in 2011, but this plan was dropped later.
- Vellalore is a part of Kinathukadavu (state assembly constituency) and Pollachi (Lok Sabha constituency).

== Religion ==
=== Notable Temples ===
- Theneeswarar Temple
- Karivaratharaja Perumal Temple
- Periya Vinayakar Temple
- Mariamman Temple
- Yama Dharmaraja Temple
- Muniappan Temple
- Kondathu mahaKaliamman Temple
- Arasannan Temple
- Pechiamman Temple
- madhuraiveeran Temple
- Arupaththu(60)veetukar or umamaheswarar Temple( ther kovil)

== Coimbatore Integrated Bus Terminus ==
An Integrated bus terminus for Coimbatore was announced by the Chief Minister of Tamil Nadu at Vellalore at a cost of 178 Crore Rupee and is under construction in Anbu Nagar near to the Coimbatore Ring Road. However the plan was dropped in 2023.
