= Townhall, Coimbatore =

Suburb of Coimbatore in Tamil Nadu, India

Townhall
- suburb
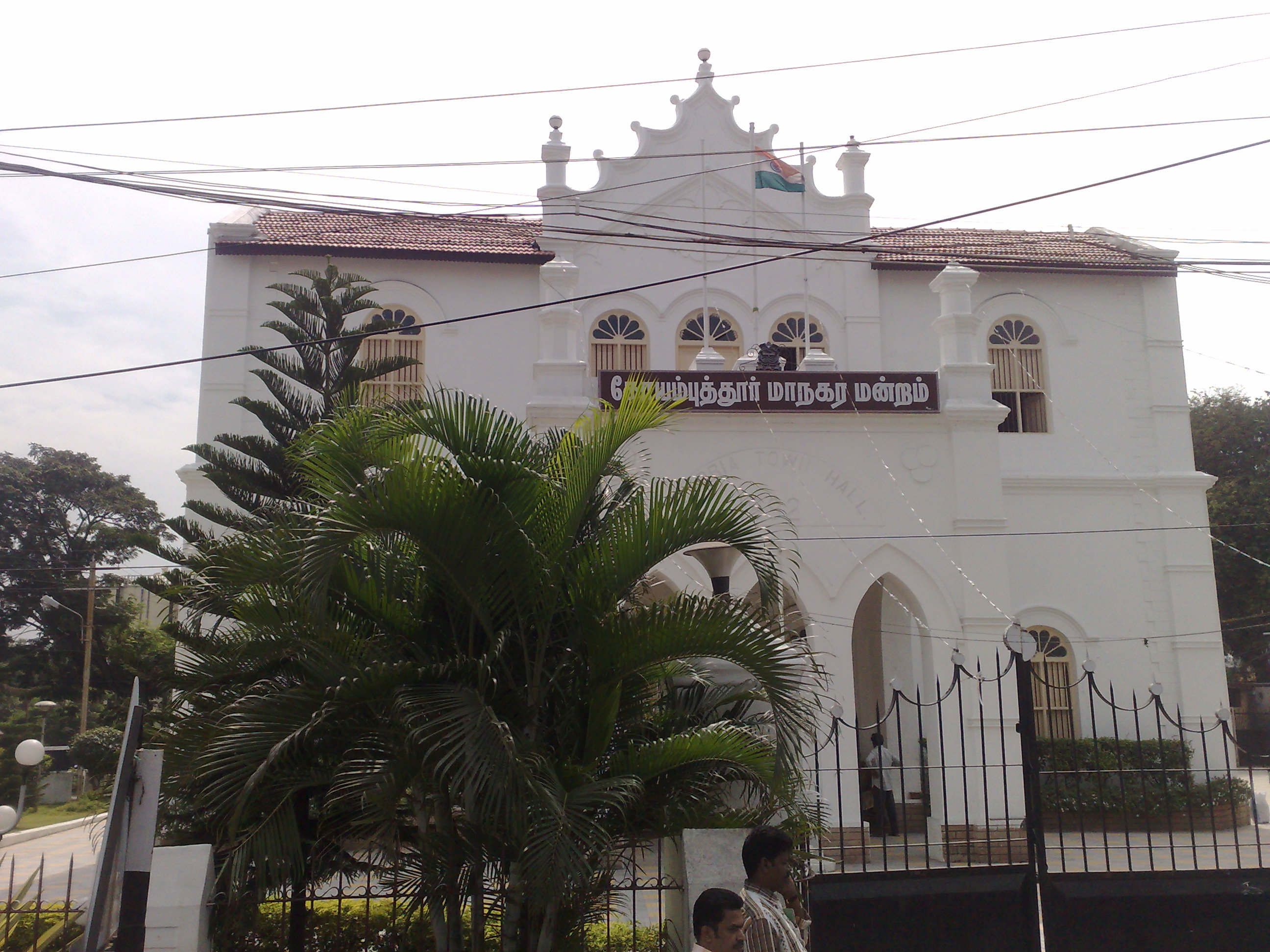
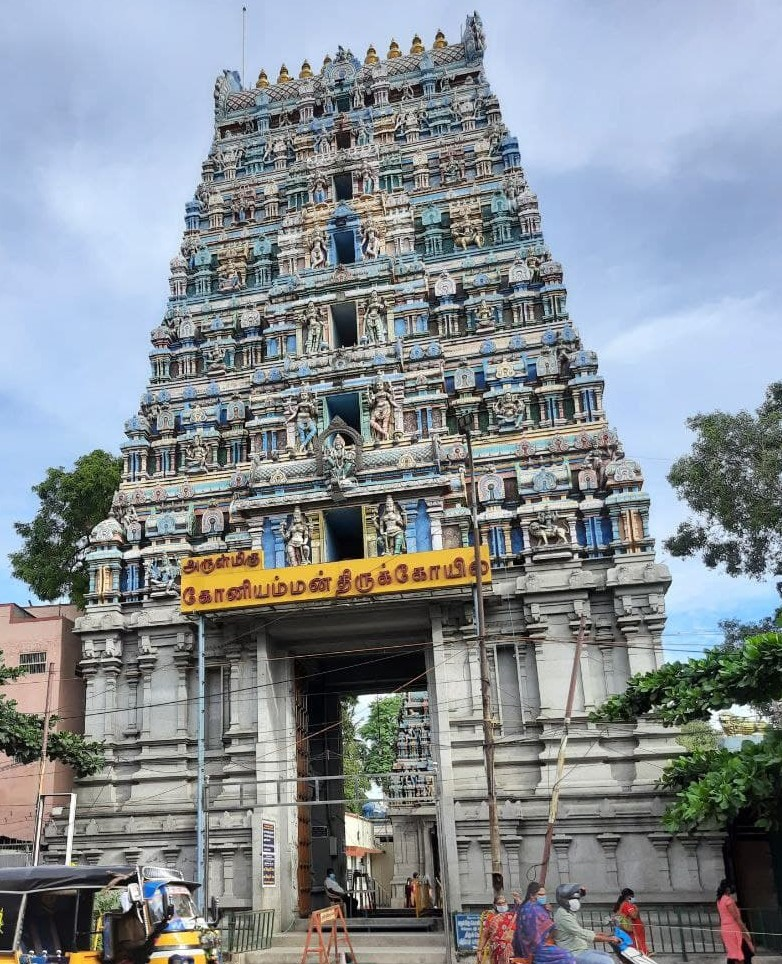
- From top, left to right: Victoria Town Hall, Koniamman Temple

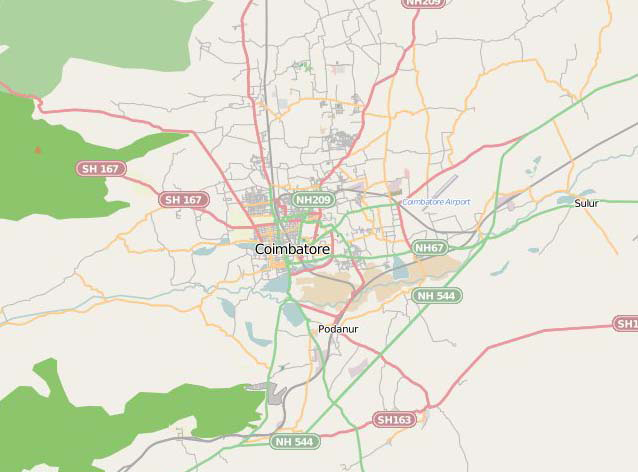
- Location in Coimbatore Location in Tamil Nadu, India
- Coordinates: 10.991090°N 76.960037°E
- Country: India
- State: Tamil Nadu
- District: Coimbatore
- Metro: Coimbatore
- Zone: Coimbatore Central

Area
  - Total: 6 km^{2} (2.3 sq mi)
- Elevation: 411 m (1,348 ft)

Languages
  - Official: Tamil
- Time zone: UTC+5:30 (IST)
- PIN: 641001
- Telephone code: 91–422
- Vehicle registration: TN-66
- Lok Sabha constituency: Coimbatore
- Assembliy constituency: Coimbatore South

Townhall is the core part of the city of Coimbatore in Tamil Nadu, India. It is the largest and the major commercial hub in the city with locations such as Oppanakara Street, Raja Street, Ukkadam, VH Road and NH Road. The locality derives its name from the Victoria Town Hall, Coimbatore. It is centrally located in the city.

== Geography ==
Townhall is located about 11 km from the Coimbatore International Airport, 1 km from City railway station, 4 km from Coimbatore North Junction, 3 km from Gandhipuram Central Bus Terminus and 8 km from Podanur railway station. Townhall shares its borders with Gandhipuram, Ramanathapuram, Selvapuram, Gandhipuram Karumbukadai, R. S. Puram and Uppilipalayam.

== Economy ==
Townhall is a major commercial center in Coimbatore. It consists of various commercial enterprises and markets. Oppanakara Street is widely regarded as one of the most commercially significant retail stretches in Tamil Nadu outside Chennai. Located in the heart of Coimbatore’s Townhall area, the street spans approximately 1.5 km and is home to hundreds of textile, jewellery, and footwear stores, attracting lakhs of shoppers, especially during festivals like Diwali and Pongal.

== Infrastructure ==
The office of Coimbatore Corporation is located in Townhall at the Victoria Townhall building. To ease the traffic congestion, an overpass flyover is being constructed at a cost of ₹265 crore in Ukkadam.

=== Transport ===
Gandhipuram Central Bus Terminus and Ukkadam Bus Terminus are located at a distance of 3 km and 1 km respectively from Town Hall. Coimbatore Junction, which is one of the important railway stations in Southern Railway is located here within walking distance.

== Shopping ==
The two major shopping destinations within Townhall are Big Bazar Street and Oppanakara Street. These streets serves as the epicenter of Coimbatore's textile trade, housing iconic customer favourite brands such as SPP Silks, Pothys, The Chennai Silks, Super Saravana Stores, Malabar Gold And Diamonds and Tanishq Jewellery.

== Temples ==
The Koniamman Temple, temple of guardian deity of the city is located here near to the CMC Building.

== Locality ==
Townhall is well connected to all the neighbourhoods in Coimbatore city with a bus terminus located at Ukkadam.

== Politics ==
Townhall is a part of Coimbatore South assembly constituency and Coimbatore Lok Sabha constituency.

== Hospitals ==
- Coimbatore Government Hospital

=== Landmarks ===
Coimbatore Corporation Town Hall built in 1892 and Manikoondu are the important landmarks in the locality.

== Coimbatore Metro ==
Coimbatore Metro feasibility study is completed and Ukkadam would be the hub for the metro trains with a three corridors towards Kaniyur, Coimbatore Integrated Bus Terminus and Bilichi. Whereas the other two corridors would pass through Ukkadam connecting Ganeshapuram with Karunya Nagar and connecting Karanampettai with Thaneerpandal.
