= Irugur =

Suburb of Coimbatore, Tamil Nadu, India

- Panchayat town
- Location in Tamil Nadu, India
- Coordinates: 11.018°N 77.064°E
- Country: India
- State: Tamil Nadu
- District: Coimbatore

Area
  - Total: 11.65 km^{2} (4.50 sq mi)

Population (2011)
  - Total: 25,691
  - Density: 2,205/km^{2} (5,712/sq mi)

Languages
  - Official: Tamil
- Time zone: UTC+5:30 (IST)
- Telephone code: +91-422
- Vehicle registration: TN 37, TN 66

Irugur is a panchayat town in Sulur taluk of Coimbatore district in the Indian state of Tamil Nadu. It is located in the north-western part of the state. Spread across an area of 11.65 km^{2} (4.50 sq mi), it had a population of 25,691 individuals as per the 2011 census.

== Geography and administration ==
Irugur is located in Sulur taluk of Coimbatore district in the Indian state of Tamil Nadu. Spread across an area of 11.65 km^{2} (4.50 sq mi), it is one of the 33 panchayat towns in the district. It is located in the western part of the state. The region has a tropical climate with hot summers and mild winters. The highest temperatures are recorded between March and May, with lowest recordings in December–January. The Irugur Junction railway station is a railhead in the Southern Railway zone that serves the region. It is located in the Jolarpettai–Shoranur line between Tiruppur and Coimbatore North.

The town panchayat is headed by a chairperson, who is elected by the members, who are chosen through direct elections. The town forms part of the Sulur Assembly constituency that elects its member to the Tamil Nadu legislative assembly and the Coimbatore Lok Sabha constituency that elects its member to the Parliament of India.

== Demographics ==
As per the 2011 census, Irugur had a population of 25,691 individuals across 7,459 households. The population saw a marginal increase compared to the previous census in 2001 when 18,622 inhabitants were registered. The population consisted of 12,909 males and 12,782 females. About 2,340 individuals were below the age of six years. The entire population is classified as urban. The town has an average literacy rate of 86.1%. About 21.3% of the population belonged to scheduled castes.

About 46.7% of the eligible population were employed full-time. Hinduism was the majority religion which was followed by 89.4% of the population, with Christianity (6.9%) and Islam (3%) being minor religions. Nilakandaeshwarar Temple is a notable Hindu pilgrimate site in the town. It consists of inscription dated to the reign on Uthama Chola (971-981 CE).
