= Trichy Road, Coimbatore =

Arterial road in Coimbatore, India

Trichy Road
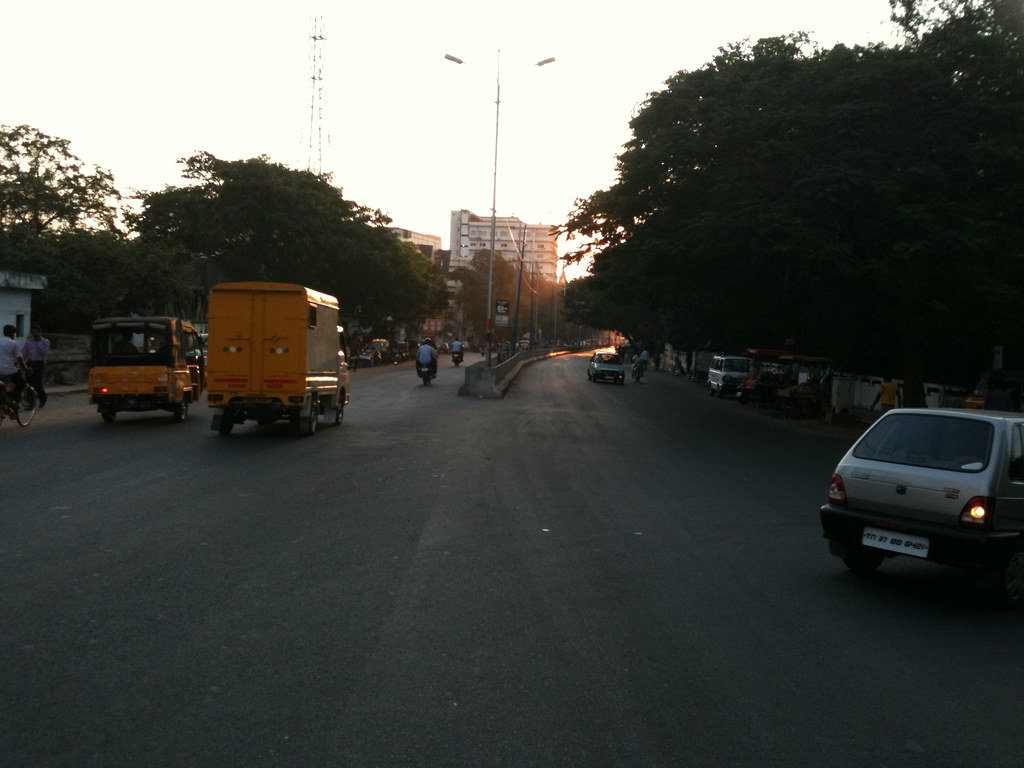
- Maintained by: National Highways Authority of India; Coimbatore City Municipal Corporation
- Length: 16.2 mi (26.1 km)
- west end: Coimbatore Medical College, Coimbatore
- Major junctions: State Bank Road/Big Bazar Street( Coimbatore Medical College Hospital ) Arts College Road/Sungam Lake Road(LIC Divisional Office); Nirmala College Road/Puliakulam Road/Sungam Bypass Road(Sungam; Nanjundapuram Road/Puliakulam Road(Ramanathapuram); Sowripalayam Road/Thiruvalluvar Nagar Road(Sowripalayam Pirivu); Perks Arch Road/Kallimadai Road(Kallimadai); Masakalipalayam Road(Coimbatore Boat House); Kamarajar Road/Vellalore Road(Singanallur); Neelikonampalayam Road/Anayangadu Road(Vasantha mills); SIHS Colony road (SIHS Colony road junction); Irugur Road/Nesavalar Colony Road(Ondipudur); Peedampalli Road(Kathiri Mills); Irugur Road(Irugur Pirivu); Coimbatore Bypass Road(Chinthamanipudur L&T Bypass Junction); Pallapalayam Road(Pappampatty Pirivu); Ravathoor Road/Kannampalayam Road(Ravathoor Pirivu); Kannampalayam Road(Ranganathapuram); Neelambur Road(Sulur LIC junction); Neelambur Road/Kalangal Road(Sulur); National Highway 181(India)/Somanur Road/Pollachi Road(Karanampettai)
- east end: Karanampettai, Coimbatore

Trichy Road is an arterial road in Coimbatore, India. This road connects the city to Singanallur Bus Terminus and Sulur Air Force Station and the east and south-east suburbs in the Coimbatore metropolitan area. This road, along with Avinashi Road reveals Coimbatore's development, mostly along the eastern and western sides of these roads. It is considered to be one of the arterial roads with lesser traffic congestion.

== Description ==
Coimbatore Junction is located at the road's western end. Trichy Road is the main gateway into the city by road from Southern and Eastern parts of Tamil Nadu such as Palladam, Dharapuram, Karur and Madurai. This road is a part of NH 81 (Coimbatore - Chidambaram Highway). It is maintained by the National Highways Authority of India. This road is a 23-km stretch running diagonally across the city in the east–west orientation, slightly moving along the South East tangent. Trichy road starts near the Coimbatore Medical College Hospital in Gopalapuram, and passes through the neighbourhoods of Singanallur, Ramanathapuram, Ondipudur, Chinthamanipudur, Sulur and finally Karanampettai.

== Alignment ==
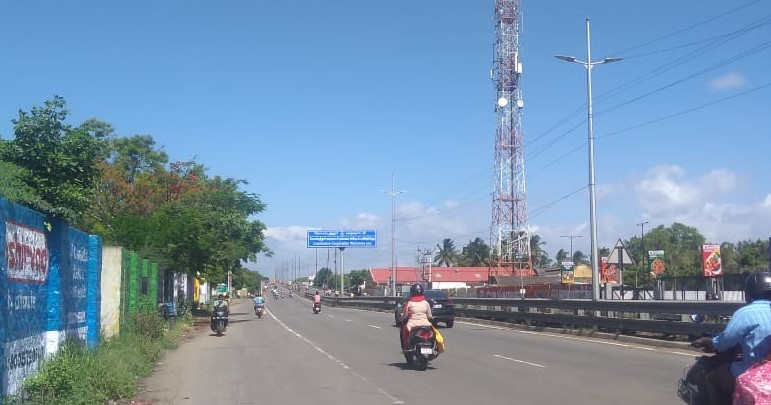
Trichy Road near Ondipudur Flyover

The road is a four lane road in most stretches except between Chinthamanipudur L&T Bypass Junction and Pappampatty Pirivu.

== Flyovers ==
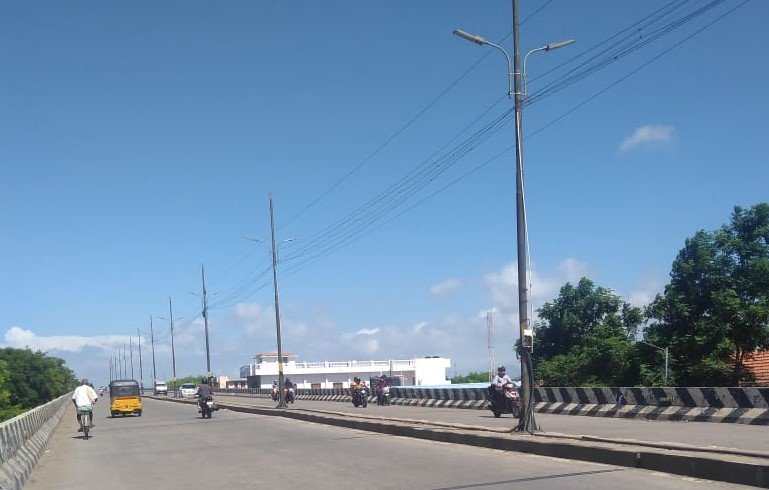
Ondipudur Flyover

In Trichy Road, the Ondipudur Flyover overpassing the Irugur-Podanur railway line opened in 2007 and Trichy Road Flyover bypassing the Ramanathapuram and Sungam junctions is under construction. A four-lane flyover has been proposed at Singanallur, the most congested traffic junction on the road, to reduce traffic congestion.

== Bus terminals ==
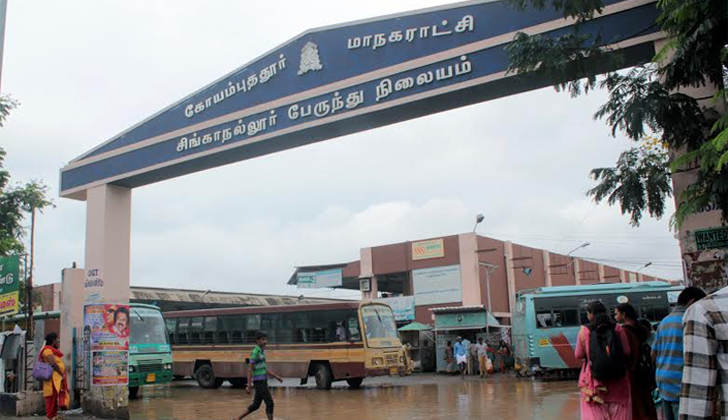
Singanallur Bus Terminus

The Singanallur Bus Terminus is located along the road. The Sulur Bus Terminus, a suburban bus terminal, is located on the road, which is famous to be handled as temporary mofussil bus terminal of the city to handle festival rush.

== Airforce Station ==
- Sulur Air Force Station, Coimbatore

== Places ==
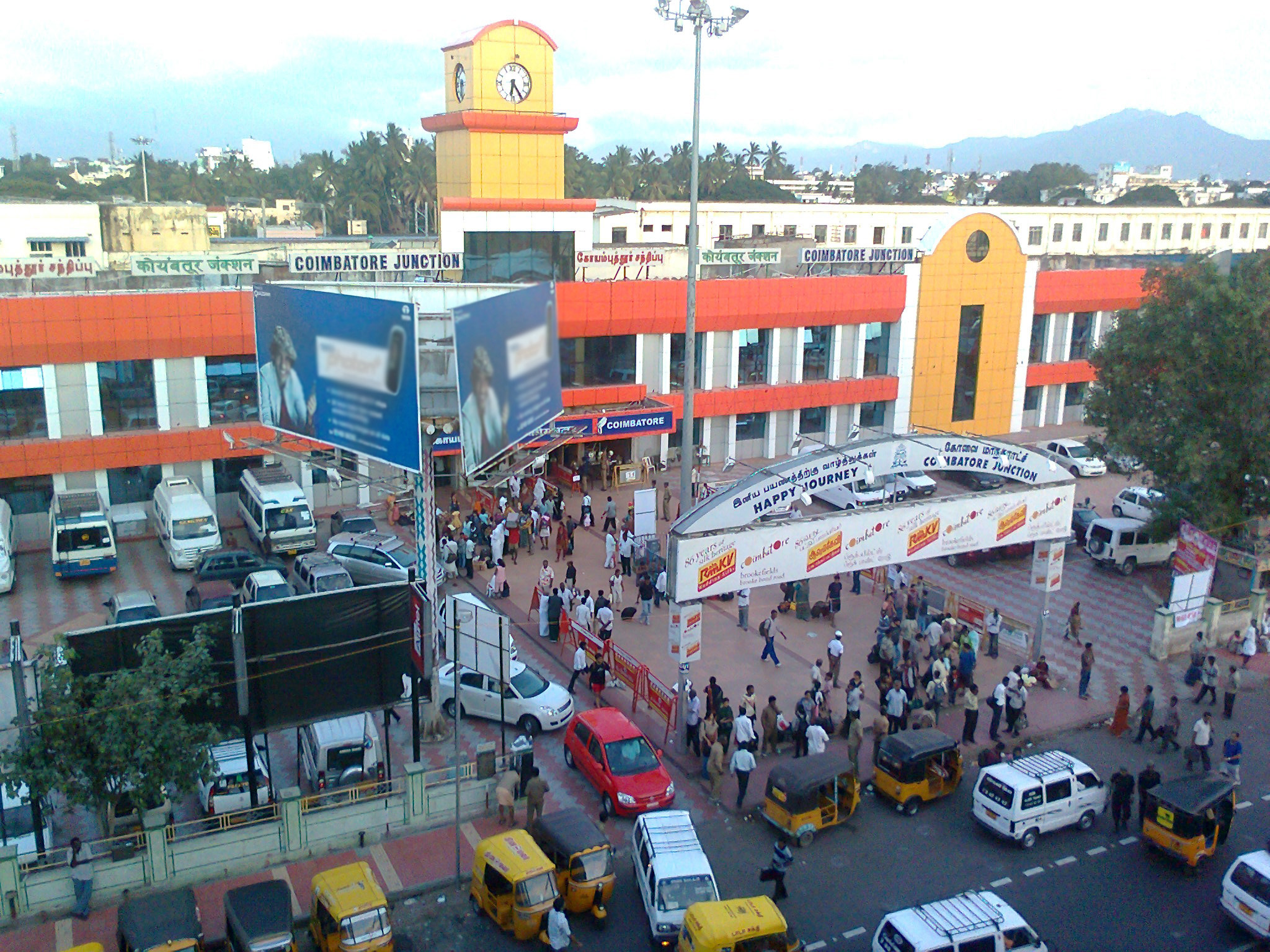
Coimbatore Junction is located to the west end of Trichy Road

- Coimbatore Junction and Coimbatore Medical College Hospital Junction
- LIC junction
- Sungam junction
- Ramanathapuram junction
- Sowripalayam Pirivu
- Kallimadai junction
- Coimbatore Boat House junction
- Singanallur junction
- Vasantha mills
- SIHS Colony road junction
- Ondipudur Sungam Road junction
- Ondipudur
- Kathir Mills
- Irugur Pirivu
- Chinthamanipudur L&T Bypass Junction
- Pappampatty Pirivu Junction
- Ravathoor Pirivu
- Ranganathapuram
- Sulur LIC junction
- Sulur junction
- Karanampettai junction

== Landmarks ==
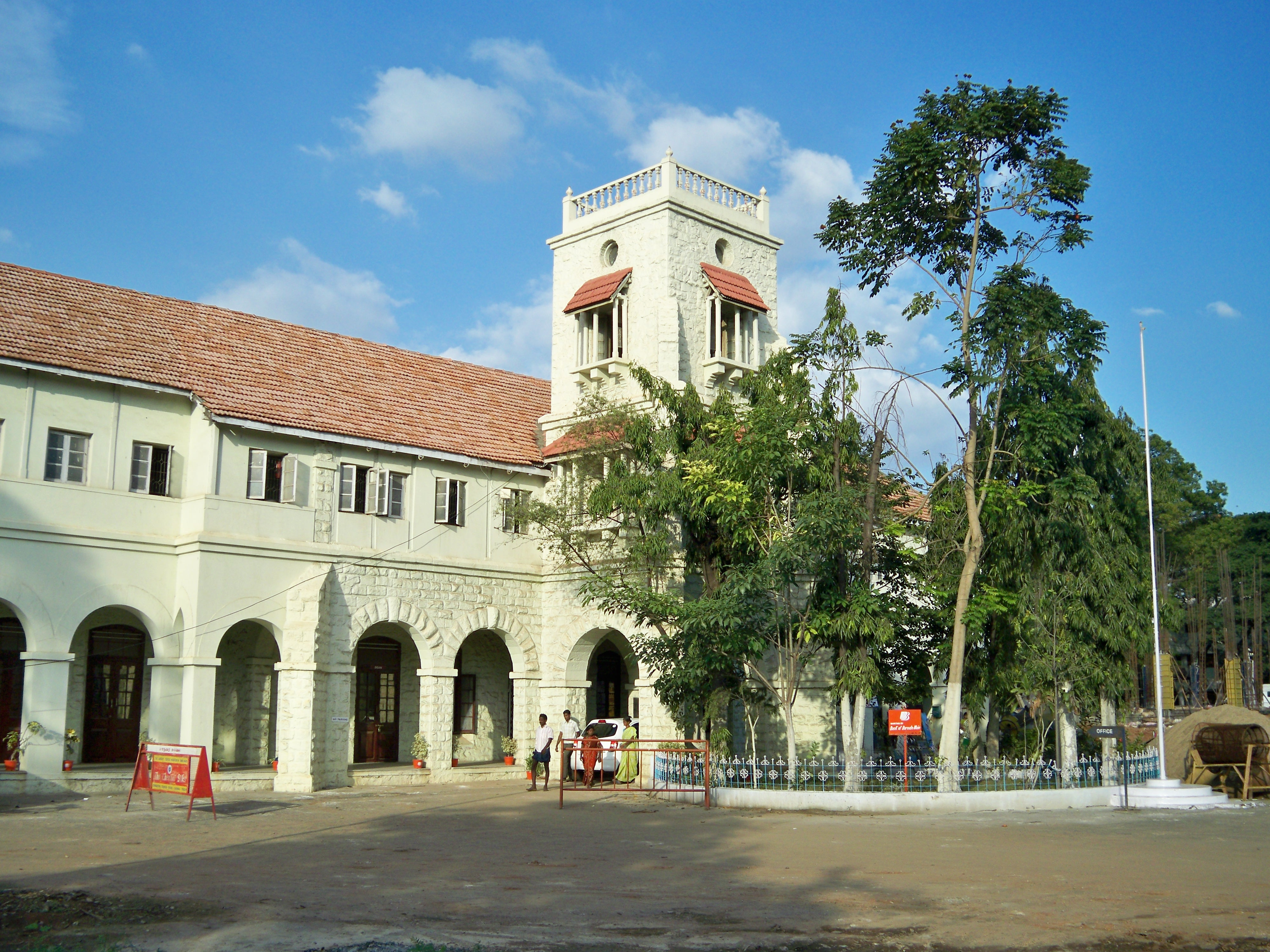
Coimbatore Medical College Hospital located on Trichy Road was built in 1909

- Coimbatore Medical College Hospital
- LIC Divisional Office
- Coimbatore Stock Exchange
- Coimbatore City Boat House
- Singanallur Farmers Market
- Shanthi Social Services
- Miraj Cinemas

=== Restaurants ===
- Hotel Sri Surya
- Sri Balaji Arul Jothi
- Shree Anandhaas
- Hotel Kandha
- HMR Briyani Hut
- Kock Racko
- Junior Kupannna
- Canteen Savira
- Absolute Biriyani
- RHR Hotel

=== Hotels ===
- Oceandrive Hotel

=== Parks and recreation ===
- SSS Park
- Coimbatore City Boat House
- Sulur Boat House

=== Educational institutions ===
- Kendria Vidyalaya School
- Trinity Matric Hr Sec School
- Alvernia Matric Hr Sec School
- St.Josephs School
- Venkatalakshmi Matric School
- Perks Matric School
- Air Force School
- Coimbatore Corporation Hr Sec School
- Nirmala Matric School
- Nirmala College for Women
- Carmel Garden Matric School
- RVS College of Arts & Science
- RVS School of Architecture
- RVS College of Engineering and Technology
- Hindustan International School

=== Other notable landmarks ===
- NGR Statue, Sungam
- NGR Statue, Singanallur

=== Cinemas ===
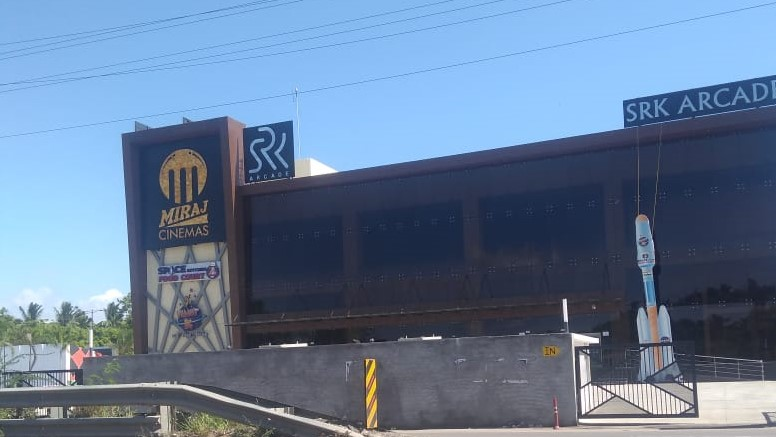
Miraj Cinemas, Ondipudur

- Miraj Cinemas- 5 Screens
- Jaishanthi Theatre
- Ambal Theatre (defunct)
- Radharani Theatre (defunct)

=== Hospitals ===
- Kovai Medical Center Hospital (KMCH Sulur)
- Saraswathi Hospital
- Dr.Muthu's Hospital
- Singanallur Corporation Health Care Centre
- NG Hospital
- ESI dispensary, Singanallur
- Coimbatore Child Trust Hospital
- VGM Hospital
- Medwin Hospital
- Deepam Hospital
- Richmond Hospital
- N.M. Hospital
- Sri Bala Medical Centre Hospital
- Arthy Hospital
- Masonic Medical Centre for Children
- Coimbatore Medical College Hospital

=== Markets ===
- Farmers Market, Singanallur
