= Karanampettai =

- Suburb
- Location in Tamil Nadu, India
- Coordinates: 11.02°N 77.18°E
- Country: India
- State: Tamil Nadu
- Region: Kongu Nadu
- District: Tiruppur
- Metropolitan area: Coimbatore
- Elevation: 305 m (1,001 ft)

Population (2011)
  - Total: 6,987

Languages
  - Official: Tamil
- Time zone: UTC+5:30 (IST)
- PIN: 641401
- Telephone code: +91-4255
- Vehicle registration: TN-37Z

Karanampettai is a town located in the Tiruppur district of Tamil Nadu, India. It is a suburb of Coimbatore.It lies on the National Highway 81. It is a part of Palladam taluk and Palladam (state assembly constituency) which comes under the Coimbatore Parliament Constituency.

== Geography ==
Karanampettai is located at 11.02°N 77.18°E. It has an average elevation of 305 meters. It is located at about 30 km from Coimbatore and 29 km from Tiruppur.It lies on the National Highway 81 (India) Trichy Road connecting the city of Coimbatore with central and eastern parts of Tamilnadu.

== Demographics ==
As per 2011 census, the population of the town is 6987. As of 2001 India census,

== Transport ==
Karanampettai is well connected by Road and Rail. The nearest railway stations are at Sulur Road railway station which is 7 km away and Somanur which is 8 km away from the town.The nearest airport is Coimbatore International Airport.The town is connected well with Coimbatore, Tiruppur, Madurai and Tiruchirappalli. The town has frequent town buses to Gandhipuram Central Bus Terminus and Ukkadam Bus Terminus in Coimbatore.

The Eastern bypass for Coimbatore city is planned between Karanampettai and Narasimhanaickenpalayam to avoid traffic congestion in the city.

=== Coimbatore metro ===
The Corridor-III is planned to connect Karanampettai in Trichy Road to Thaneerpandal in Thadagam Road covering a distance of 42 km, being the second longest corridor in Coimbatore metro.

== Air Force Station Sulur ==
Sulur Air Force Base operated by the Indian Air Force is located at Kangayampalayam village near Sulur. It is located at a distance of 5 km.

A defence corridor project has been proposed near to Karanampettai.

== Education ==
The Educational Institutions in Karanampettai are:

- Karanampettai High School
- Adharsh Vidhyalaya Matric Hr. Sec. School
