= Ukkadam =

Neighbourhood in Coimbatore, Tamil Nadu, India

- Neighbourhood
- Location in Tamil Nadu, India Ukkadam (India)
- Coordinates: 10°59′28″N 76°57′40″E
- Country: India
- State: Tamil Nadu
- District: Coimbatore

Languages
  - Official: Tamil
- Time zone: UTC+5:30 (IST)
- PIN: 641001,641008
- Telephone code: +91-422
- Vehicle registration: TN 66
- Coastline: 0 kilometres (0 mi)

Ukkadam is a part of Townhall locality in the core part of the city of Coimbatore, Tamilnadu, India. Ukkadam Bus Terminal, which is one of the seven major bus stands in the city, is located in this neighborhood. Ukkadam is famous for its Fish Market and Jackfruit Market.

== Transport ==
Ukkadam Bus Terminus is located at Ukkadam serving the intracity bus services within the Coimbatore metropolitan area and intercity bus services to Pollachi, Palakkad, Palani, Valparai and Thrissur.

== Ukkadam Flyover ==
To ease the traffic congestion in Ukkadam signal and Aathupalam, an overpass flyover is being constructed at a cost of ₹265 crore in Ukkadam covering Sungam Bypass, Perur Bypass, Pollachi Road and Palakkad Road.

== Politics ==
Ukkadam is a part of Coimbatore South (state assembly constituency) partially and Singanallur (state assembly constituency) partially which are part of Coimbatore (Lok Sabha constituency).

== Coimbatore Metro ==
Coimbatore Metro feasibility study is completed and Ukkadam would be the hub for the metro trains with a three corridors towards Kaniyur, Coimbatore Integrated Bus Terminus and Bilichi. Whereas the other two corridors would pass through Ukkadam connecting Ganeshapuram with Karunya Nagar and connecting Karanampettai with Thaneerpandal.

== Gallery ==
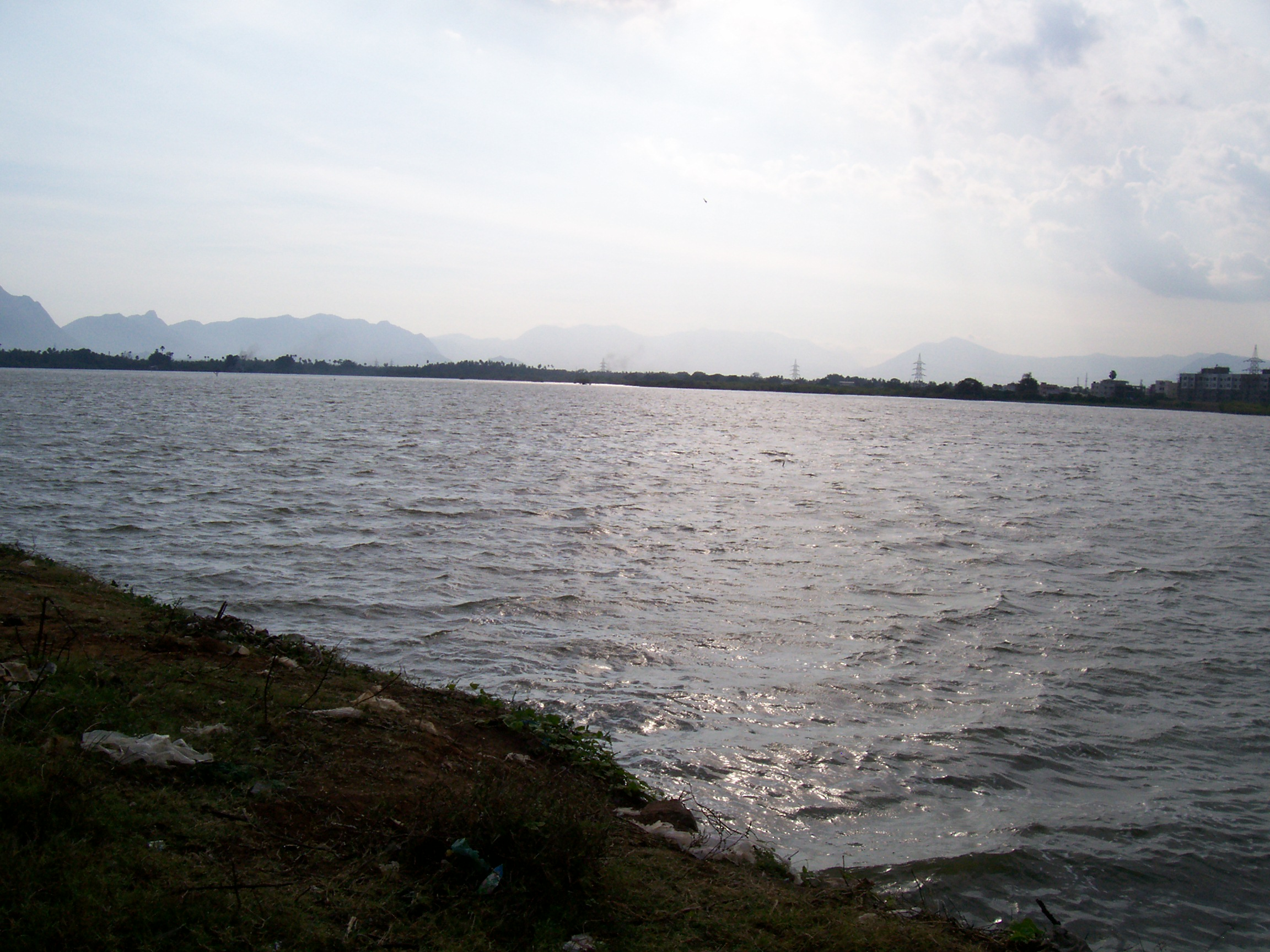
Ukkadam Tank

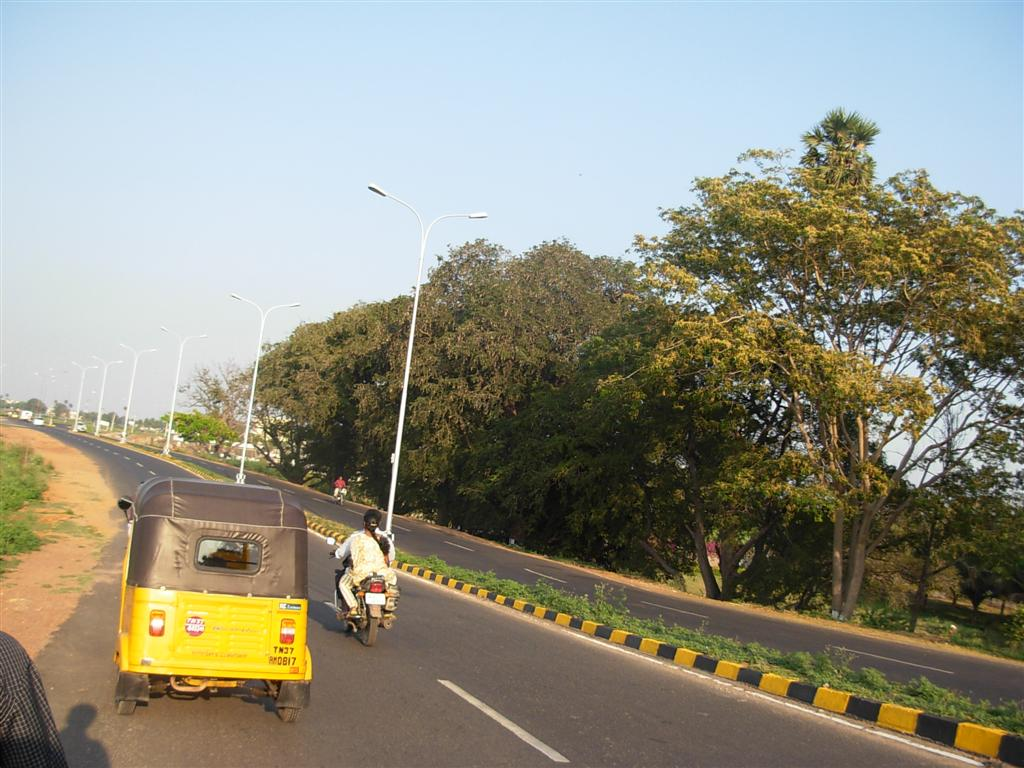
Sungam - Ukkadam bypass road

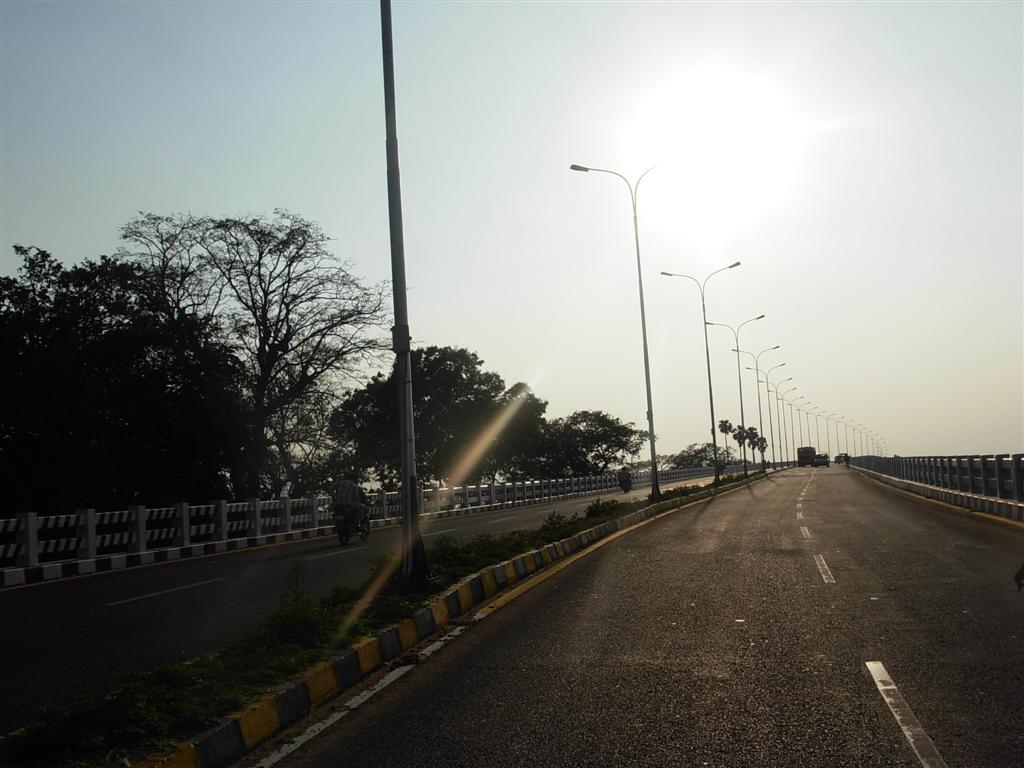
Sungam - Ukkadam bypass bridge

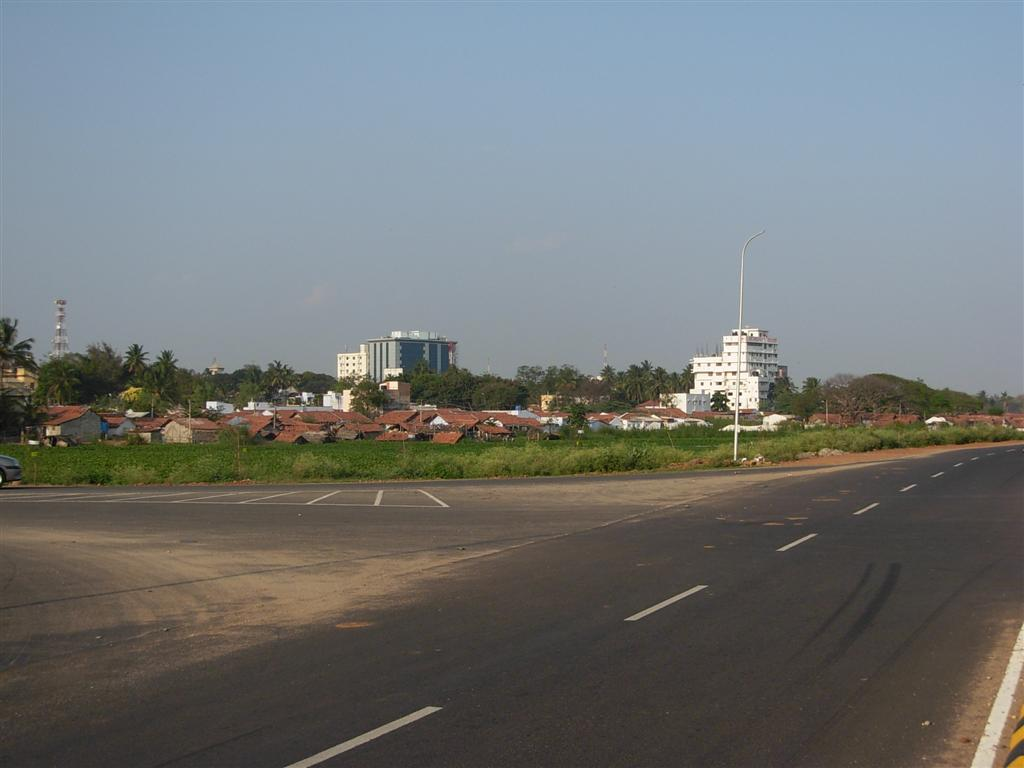
Ukkadam bypass

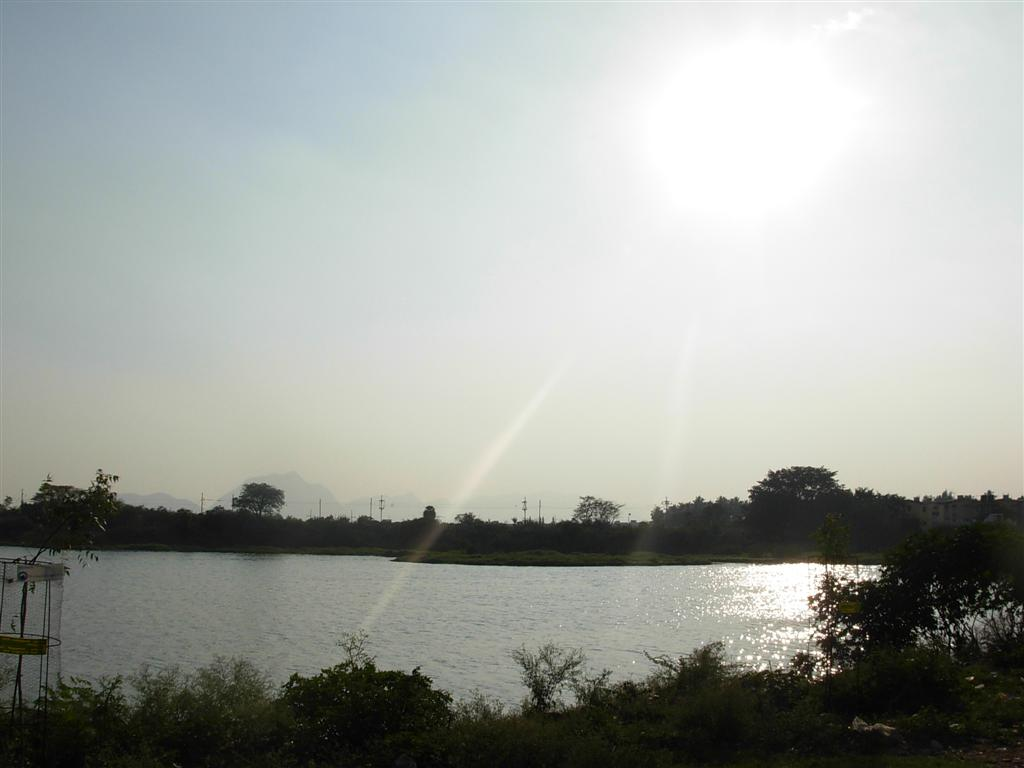
Ukkadam-Valankulam Lake

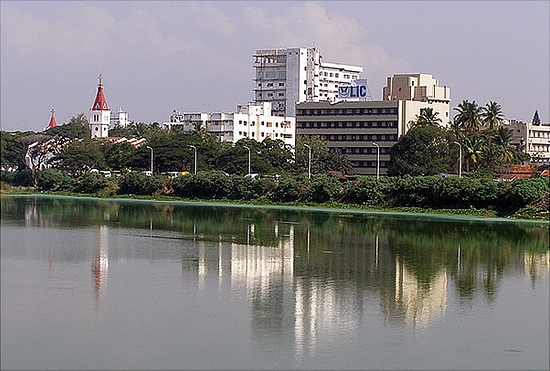
A view of CSI Church and LIC building, Ukkadam lake is in the foreground
