= List of Coimbatore Metro stations =

The Coimbatore Metro is a planned rapid transit system serving the city of Coimbatore in India and its suburbs. Phase I of the project consisted of two corridors covering a length of 39 kilometres (24 mi). The project is planned on project on Avinashi Road and Sathyamangalam Road in Coimbatore at ₹9,000 crore for the project.

== Metro Stations ==
†	Terminal station
*	Transfer station to other lines
†*	Transfer station to Indian Railways
**	Terminal and transfer station to Indian Railways
††	Terminal and transfer station to Transportation Hubs
†¤	Transfer station to Transportation hubs

Station Name		Line	Opened	Layout	Connections	Notes	Refs
English	Tamil	Line	Opened	Layout	Connections	Notes	Refs
Athipalayam	அத்திபாளையம்	Green	NA	Elevated	NA	NA	NA
SITRA Circle	சித்ரா	Red	NA	Elevated	Kalapatti and SIHS Colony	NA	NA
Chithra Nagar	சித்ரா நகர்	Green	NA	Elevated	NA	NA	NA
Collectorate	மாவட்ட ஆட்சியர் அலுவலகம்	Red; Green	NA	Elevated	Collectorate, District Court and DSP Office	NA	NA
Coimbatore Junction Metro**	கோயம்புத்தூர் சந்திப்பு	Red; Green	NA	Elevated	Coimbatore Junction railway station and Coimbatore Medical College Hospital	NA	NA
Coimbatore International Airport†¤	கோவை சர்வதேச விமான நிலையம்	Red	NA	Elevated	Coimbatore International Airport	NA	NA
Coimbatore Medical College	கோவை மருத்துவக் கல்லூரி	Red	NA	Elevated	Tidel Park and Codissia	NA	NA
Coimbatore Omni Bus Stand†¤	கோயம்புத்தூர் ஆம்னி பேருந்து நிலையம்	Green	NA	Elevated	Coimbatore Omni Bus Stand	NA	NA
Fun Republic Mall	பன் மால்	Red	NA	Elevated	Masakalipalayam and Uppilipalayam	NA	NA
Ganapathy Pudur	கணபதி புதூர்	Green	NA	Elevated	NA	NA	NA
Gandhipuram Central Bus Terminus†¤	காந்திபுரம் மத்திய பேருந்து நிலையம்	Red	NA	Elevated	Gandhipuram Town and Mofussil Bus Terminals	NA	NA
GKNM Hospital	ஜி.கே.என்.எம் மருத்துவமனை	Red	NA	Elevated	Pappanaickenpalayam	NA	NA
Hope College	ஹோப் காலேஜ்	Red	NA	Elevated	Tidel Park	NA	NA
Lakshmi Mills	லட்சுமி மில்ஸ்	Red	NA	Elevated	Puliakulam and Lakshmi Mills Shopping Arcade	NA	NA
MGR Nagar	எம்ஜிஆர் நகர்	Red	NA	Elevated	NA	NA	NA
Moor Market	மூர் மார்க்கெட்	Green	NA	Elevated	NA	NA	NA
Nava India	நவ இந்தியா	Red	NA	Elevated	Hindustan Arts College and SRAC Cricket Stadium	NA	NA
Neelambur†	நீலம்பூர்	Red	NA	Elevated	PSG Institute of Technology	NA	NA
Park Plaza	பார்க் பிளாசா	Red	NA	Elevated	NA	NA	NA
Peelamedu Pudur	பீளமேடு புதூர்	Red	NA	Elevated	Peelamedu RS and PSG Tech	NA	NA
PLS Nagar	பி.எல்.எஸ் நகர்	Red	NA	Elevated	NA	NA	NA
Ramakrishna Mills	ராமகிருஷ்ணா மில்ஸ்	Green	NA	Elevated	Prozone Mall	NA	NA
Ramnagar	ராம்நகர்	Green	NA	Elevated	Semmozhi Poonga	NA	NA
Saravanampatti	சரவணம்பட்டி	Green	NA	Elevated	IT Corridor	NA	NA
Townhall	நகர் மண்டபம்	Red	NA	Elevated	CMC Central Office, Oppanakara Street	NA	NA
Ukkadam Bus Terminus	உக்கடம் பேருந்து நிலையம்	Red	NA	Elevated	Ukkadam Market Complex, Ukkadam Lakefront	NA	NA
Valiyampalayam Pirivur†	வலியம்பாளையம் பிரிவு	Green	NA	Elevated	NA	NA	NA
Venkittapuram	வெங்கிட்டாபுரம்	Red	NA	Elevated	NA	NA	NA
VGP Nagar	விஜிபி நகர்	Green	NA	Elevated	NA	NA	NA
Vinayagapuram	விநாயகபுரம்	Green	NA	Elevated	NA	NA	NA
Viswasapuram	விஸ்வாசபுரம்	Green	NA	Elevated	NA	NA	NA

== Statistics ==
Total number of metro stations	32
Number of interchange stations	2
Number of Elevated stations	32
Number of underground stations	0
Number of stations At-Grade	0

== See also ==
- List of Ahmedabad Metro stations
- List of Chennai Metro stations
- List of Delhi Metro stations
- List of Hyderabad Metro stations
- List of Jaipur Metro stations
- List of Kochi Metro stations
- List of Kolkata Metro stations
- List of Lucknow Metro stations
- List of Madurai Metro stations
- List of Mumbai Metro stations
- List of Noida Metro stations
- List of Nagpur Metro stations
- List of Namma Metro stations
- List of Navi Mumbai Metro Stations
- List of Pune Metro stations
- List of Surat Metro stations
