= Gandhipuram Flyover =

Gandhipuram flyover
- காந்திபுரம் மேம்பாலம்

Location
- Coimbatore, India
- Roads at junction: Nanjappa Road; Avarampalayam Road; 100 Feet Road; Sathy Road

Construction
- Type: Overpass flyover
- Lanes: 4 (Tier-1), 2 (Tier-2)
- Constructed: 2018 (Tier-1), 2019 (Tier-2)

Gandhipuram flyover also known as Gandhipuram Tier 1,2 flyover is a two-tier flyover in Gandhipuram.

== Timeline ==
- 2010: Tamilnadu Government under DMK announces a three-tier flyover at Gandhipuram
- 2014: Tamilnadu Government laid foundation for the tier-1, 2 flyovers
- 2018: CM inaugurated tier-1 flyover
- 2019: CM inaugurated tier-2 flyover
- 2020: Tamilnadu Government plans to add ramps to tier-1 flyover

== Planning ==
=== Tier-1 flyover ===
The tier-1 flyover begins near the Park Gate roundana near the Coimbatore Central Jail and ends near the Coimbatore Omni Bus Terminus at Sathy Road. The flyover is 2.5 km long and has four lanes.

=== Tier-2 flyover ===
The tier-2 flyover begins near the Karpagam Cinemas in the 100 feet Road and ends near the Avarampalayam signal. The flyover is 2 km long and has two lanes.

== Future ==
The Coimbatore Municipal Corporation have proposed to construct ramps towards Bharathiyar road and 100 feet road from the Tier-1 flyover.

== See also ==
- Avinashi Road flyover
- Flyovers in Coimbatore
- Ondipudur Flyover
- Trichy Road Flyover
- Ukkadam Flyover
