= List of Madurai Metro stations =

The Madurai Metro is a planned rapid transit system serving the city of Madurai and its suburbs. Phase I of the project consisted a single corridors covering a length of 32 kilometres (20 mi). The project is planned on Tiruparankundram Road and Mattuthavani High Road in Madurai.

== Metro Stations ==
†	Terminal station
*	Transfer station to other lines
†*	Transfer station to Indian Railways
**	Terminal and transfer station to Indian Railways
††	Terminal and transfer station to Transportation Hubs
†¤	Transfer station to Transportation hubs

Station Name		Line	Opened	Layout	Connections	Notes	Ref.
English	Tamil	Line	Opened	Layout	Connections	Notes	Ref.
City Police Commissioner Office	மாவட்ட காவல் கண்காணிப்பாளர் அலுவலகம்	Line 1	NA	Elevated	NA	NA	
Dharmathupatti	தர்மத்துப்பட்டி	Line 1	NA	Elevated	NA	NA	NA
Goripalayam	கோரிப்பாளையம்	Line 1	NA	Underground	NA	NA	NA
High Court Bench	உயர்நீதிமன்ற கிளை	Line 1	NA	Elevated	NA	NA	NA
K.Pudur	புதூர்	Line 1	NA	Elevated	NA	NA	NA
Kappalur Toll Plaza	கப்பலூர் சுங்கச்சாவடி	Line 1	NA	Elevated	NA	NA	NA
Keelavasal	கீழவாசல்	Line 1	NA	Underground	NA	NA	NA
Madura College	உயர்நீதிமன்ற கிளை	Line 1	NA	Elevated	NA	NA	NA
Madurai Junction†*	மதுரை சந்திப்பு	Line 1	NA	Underground	NA	NA	NA
Mattuthavani†¤	மாட்டுத்தாவணி	Line 1	NA	Elevated	NA	NA	NA
Othakkadai†	ஒத்தக்கடை	Line 1	NA	Elevated	NA	NA	NA
Pasumalai	பசுமலை	Line 1	NA	Elevated	NA	NA	NA
Simmakkal	சிம்மக்கல்	Line 1	NA	Underground	NA	NA	NA
Therkuvasal	தெற்குவாசல்	Line 1	NA	Underground	NA	NA	NA
Thirunagar	திருநகர்	Line 1	NA	Elevated	NA	NA	NA
Thiruparankundram†*	திருப்பரங்குன்றம்	Line 1	NA	Elevated	NA	NA	NA
Thoppur	தோப்பூர்	Line 1	NA	Elevated	NA	NA	NA
Tirumangalam†	திருமங்கலம்	Line 1	NA	Elevated	NA	NA	NA
Uthangudi	உத்தங்குடி	Line 1	NA	Elevated	NA	NA	NA
Palanganatham	பழங்காநத்தம்	Line 1	NA	Elevated	NA	NA	NA

== Statistics ==
Total number of metro stations	20
Number of interchange stations	0
Number of Elevated stations	15
Number of underground stations	5
Number of stations At-Grade	0

== See also ==
- List of Ahmedabad Metro stations
- List of Chennai Metro stations
- List of Coimbatore Metro stations
- List of Delhi Metro stations
- List of Hyderabad Metro stations
- List of Jaipur Metro stations
- List of Kochi Metro stations
- List of Kolkata Metro stations
- List of Lucknow Metro stations
- List of Mumbai Metro stations
- List of Noida Metro stations
- List of Nagpur Metro stations
- List of Namma Metro stations
- List of Navi Mumbai Metro Stations
- List of Pune Metro stations
- List of Surat Metro stations
