= Big Mosque =

Big Mosque may refer to:

- Athar Jamad Mosque, Coimbatore, Tamil Nadu, India; known colloquially as The Big Mosque
- Big Mosque, Poonamallee, Chennai, Tamil Nadu, India
- Kazimar Big Mosque, Madurai, Tamil Nadu, India
- Triplicane Big Mosque, Chennai, Tamil Nadu, India
