= Madurai Metro =

Rapid transit system proposed for Madurai, India

Overview
- Owner: TNMRC
- Area served: Madurai
- Locale: Madurai, Tamil Nadu
- Transit type: Mass Rapid Transit
- Number of lines: 3
- Line number: Phase-1 * Line 1 (Madurai Metro); Phase-2 * Line 2 (Madurai Metro) * Line 3 (Madurai Metro)
- Chief executive: Chennai Metro Rail Limited
- Headquarters: Madurai metropolitan area

Operation
- Began operation: Proposed
- Operation will start: Proposed(under review)
- Operator: CMRL
- Train length: 3 coaches

Technical
- Top speed: 60 km/h (37 mph)

Madurai Metro is a proposed rapid transit system for Madurai, Tamil Nadu, India.

As of March 2023, the DPR preparation contract was awarded to Aarvee Associates. It was ready by July 2023, with construction work planned to commence by end of 2024. In December 2024, the DPR for the Madurai Metro was submitted to the Central Government for approval. In February 2025, Officials indicated that the project could receive central government approval within 6 to 9 months and that groundwork for land acquisition and utility shifting would begin soon. In September 2025, an RTI revealed that the Central Government was still reviewing the DPR, leading to public concern over the delays. Additionally, reports emerged of a planning hurdle with the National Highways Authority of India (NHAI) regarding alignment clashes in the Thirumangalam area. As of November 18, 2025, the Union government has rejected the proposed Metro Rail projects for Madurai and Coimbatore, citing that both cities do not meet the population criteria of 2 million (20 lakh) as per the 2011 census. However, the Chennai Metro Rail Limited (CMRL) has stated that this is a temporary rejection and the project is not cancelled, clarifying that the proposals are still under consideration. CMRL also mentioned that they would provide a detailed explanation to the central government about the current population and that the project will continue.

== History ==
=== Background ===
As the monorail market is estimated to be ₹72,000 crore (US$10 billion) in India, the then Governor of Tamil Nadu, Banwarilal Purohit announced in Legislative assembly that the Government of Tamil Nadu had decided to do a feasibility study for introducing monorail system in Madurai along with Salem, Thiruchirappalli, and Tirunelveli.

In 2020, the government has earmarked a sum of about ₹60,000 crore (US$8.4 billion) for metro and monorail projects in Tamil Nadu. At that time SASTRA, using Geographical Information System (GIS) tools, had worked out a proposal for a suburban railway route for Madurai City.

Madurai proposed routes for monorail were:

1. Tirumangalam – Mattuthavani - via. Kappalur, Thirunagar, Thiruparankundram, Palanganatham, TN polytechnic, Madurai Railway station, Simmakkal, Goripalayam, Tallakulam, Madurai Dist court.
2. Thiruparankundrum – Park Town - via. Thiruparankundrum Temple, Airport, SN College, Avaniapuram, Villapuram, South Gate, Keelavasal, Nelpettai, Goripalayam, Narimedu, Incometax office, Krishnapuram colony, Viswanathapuram, P & T Nagar.
3. Kochadai – Viraganur - via. Kalavasal, Arappalayam, Ellis Nagar, Madurai Railway station, Vilakuthoon, Keelavasal, Munichalai, Teppakulam.
4. Vandiyur – Iyer Bungalow - via. Anna Nagar, Suguna stores, Aravind Eye Hospital, K. K. Nagar, Anna Bus stand, GH, Goripalayam, Reserve Line, K. Pudur
5. Anuppanadi - Koodal Nagar - Via Teppakulam, Anna nagar, Apollo Hospitals, Mattuthavani, Surveyor Colony, Mahatma Gandhi Nagar, Anaiyur
6. Tirumangalam to Melur - Tirumangalam, Kappalur, Thoppur, Tirunagar, Vadapalanji, Madurai Kamaraj University, Nagamalai, Nagari, Samayanallur, Vilangudi, Koodal nagar, Arappalayam Bus Terminus, Simmakal, Madurai railway Jn, Periyar Bus Terminus, Jaihindpuram, Villapuram, Mahal, Teppakulam, Anna nagar, Vandiyur, Pondy koil, Mattuthavani, High Court, TVS Srichakra, Melur.
7. Azhagar-koil to Avaniapuram - Azhagarkoil, Moondru Mavadi, K.Pudur, KK Nagar, G.H., Goripalayam, Sellur, Koodal nagar, Arapalayam BS, P.P. chavadi (in Theni main rd), Bye pass rd (Ponmeni), Vasantha Nagar roundana, T V S Nagar, Pykara, Thirupprankundram, Nilaiyur, Airport, Mandela nagar, Transport Nagar (along ring road), Avaniapuram.

Transfer Points were: Avaniyapuram, Goripalayam, Madurai Railway station, Periyar Bus stand, Keelavasal, Anna Nagar, Teppakulam, Mattuthavani, Tiruparankundrum

The Government of Tamilnadu proposed for a Metro Rail in Madurai, the third largest city in the state of Tamilnadu. CMRL releases tender notice for preparing the project's feasibility report in March, 2022 and BARSYL bags the tender to prepare feasibility study with the deadline of May 2022.

== Proposed corridors ==
=== Phase I ===
Proposed Metro Rail Routes in Madurai at Phase-1 stage

Madurai Metro
Corridor No	Line	From	To	Roads	Via	Length (km)	Number of Stations
1	Line-1	Tirumangalam	Othakadai	Tiruparankundram Road, Mattuthavani High Road	AIIMS, Thiruparankundram, Periyar Bus Terminus, MGR Bus Terminus, Meenakshi Temple, Madras High Court- Madurai Bench	31	22

=== Phase II ===
Proposed Metro Rail Routes in Madurai at Phase-II stage

Madurai Metro
Corridor No	Line	From	To	Via	Length (km)	Number of Stations
2	Line-2	Kattapuli Nagar	Madurai International Airport	Samayanallur, Paravai, Fatima College, Madurai Junction, MGR Bus Terminus, Meenakshi Temple, Perungudi	20	14
3	Line-3	Manalur	Chekanurani	Velammal College, Keelavasal, Madurai Junction, MGR Bus Terminus, Meenakshi Temple, Kalavasal, Nagamalai Pudukkottai	23	19

== Project timeline ==
- 2012: The Indian government under former Prime Minister Manmohan Singh announces metro rail projects for Tier-II cities, including Madurai.
- 2012: Tamil Nadu Government under J. Jayalalithaa shelves the metro rail project and announces monorail project for Tier II cities such as Madurai, Tiruchirappalli, Tirunelveli and Salem
- 2021: Tamil Nadu Government under M. K. Stalin announces metro rail projects for Tier II cities such as Madurai and Coimbatore.
- 2022: BARSYL bags the tender to prepare feasibility study for the mass rapid transportation system in Madurai
- 2022 November: Madurai metro rail will cover 29 km with 17 stations in phase 1 stated by the DFR prepared by Balaji Rail Road Systems (BARSYL) and the Chennai Metro Rail Limited (CMRL)
- 2022 December: Detailed Project Report (DPR) was awaited for Madurai Metro
- 2023 March: Aarvee Associates bags the tender to prepare Detailed Project Report (DPR) for 1.35 crores.
- 2024 December: The DPR for the Madurai Metro was formally submitted to the Central Government for approval.
- 2025 January: CMRL announced that preparatory work, including land acquisition and utility shifting, would begin soon, anticipating approval within the year.
- 2025 February: Officials indicated that the project could receive central government approval within 6 to 9 months and that groundwork for land acquisition and utility shifting would begin soon.
- 2025 September: A Right to Information (RTI) query revealed that the Central Government had not yet approved the DPR. The Ministry of Housing and Urban Affairs stated that the project was still under "preliminary examination". A clash was reported between the metro's proposed alignment and the National Highways Authority of India's (NHAI) plan for vehicular underpasses at the Sipcot and Thoppur junctions. Joint inspections were conducted to resolve this conflict.
- 2025 November: The Union Government of India returned the metro proposals for Madurai and Coimbatore, citing the population of both cities as less than 20 lakh. However, the Tamil Nadu government raised concerns about what it called an “uneven application” of the centre's Metro Rail Policy, pointing out that cities such as Agra, Patna, and Bhopal despite having populations below this threshold, had been approved for metro projects.

== See also ==
- Chennai Metro
- Coimbatore Metro
- Kochi Metro
- List of Madurai metro stations
