= Line 2 (Coimbatore Metro) =

Transit line in Coimbatore, India

Green Line

Overview
- Status: Proposed
- Termini: Coimbatore Junction; Valiyampalayam Pirivu
- Stations: 14

Service
- Type: Rapid transit
- System: Coimbatore Metro

Technical
- Number of tracks: 2
- Character: 14.4 km Elevated
- Operating speed: 80 km/h (50 mph)

The GreenLine or Line 2 is one of the two proposed lines of Coimbatore Metro, Phase 1 Project, the second being the Red line (Line 1). The line stretches from Coimbatore Junction to Valiyampalayam Pirivu. The line consists of 14 stations.

== Stations ==
The stations proposed in the first phase of Coimbatore Metro in the Line-2 are:

Green Line
S.No	Station Name		Interchange connection	Places Connected	Layout	Opened	Depot Connection	Depot Layout
S.No	English	Tamil	Interchange connection	Places Connected	Layout	Opened	Depot Connection	Depot Layout
1	Coimbatore Junction	கோயம்புத்தூர் சந்திப்பு	Red Line, Coimbatore Junction railway station	Coimbatore Government Hospital	Elevated	Proposed Phase 1	None	None
2	Ramnagar	ராம்நகர்	None	None	Elevated	Proposed Phase 1	None	None
3	Gandhipuram Central Bus Terminus	காந்திபுரம் மத்திய பேருந்து நிலையம்	Gandhipuram Central Bus Terminus, Gandhipuram Town Bus stand	None	Elevated	Proposed Phase 1	None	None
4	Coimbatore Omni Bus Stand	கோயம்புத்தூர் ஆம்னி பேருந்து நிலையம்	Coimbatore Omni Bus Terminus	None	Elevated	Proposed Phase 1	None	None
5	Moor Market	மூர் மார்க்கெட்	None	None	Elevated	Proposed Phase 1	None	None
6	Ganapathy Pudur	கணபதி புதூர்	None	None	Elevated	Proposed Phase 1	None	None
7	Athipalayam	அத்திபாளையம்	None	None	Elevated	Proposed Phase 1	None	None
8	Ramakrishna Mills	ராமகிருஷ்ணா மில்ஸ்	None	Prozone Mall	Elevated	Proposed Phase 1	None	None
9	Vinayagapuram	விநாயகபுரம்	None	None	Elevated	Proposed Phase 1	None	None
10	Chithra Nagar	சித்ரா நகர்	None	None	Elevated	Proposed Phase 1	None	None
11	Saravanampatti	சரவணம்பட்டி	None	None	Elevated	Proposed Phase 1	None	None
12	Viswasapuram	விஸ்வாசபுரம்	None	None	Elevated	Proposed Phase 1	None	None
13	VGP Nagar	விஜிபி நகர்	None	None	Elevated	Proposed Phase 1	None	None
14	Valiyampalayam Pirivu	வலியம்பாளையம் பிரிவு	None	None	Elevated	Proposed Phase 1	None	None

== See also ==
- Line 1 (Coimbatore Metro)
- Coimbatore Metro
- Transport in Coimbatore
- List of rapid transit systems in India
- List of metro systems
