= Line 3 (Madurai Metro) =

Proposed Transit line in Madurai, India

Purple Line (Line 3)

Overview
- Status: DPR to be Planned
- Termini: Manalur; Chekanurani
- Stations: 19

Service
- Type: Rapid transit
- System: Madurai Metro
- Operator: CMRL

History
- Planned opening: To be proposed

Technical
- Line length: 23 km (14 mi)
- Number of tracks: 2
- Operating speed: 60 km/h (37 mph)

The Purple Line (Line 3) is one of the three proposed lines of Madurai Metro which is to be implemented at the Phase 2 of Madurai Metro. The line stretches from Manalur to Chekanurani. The line consists of 19 stations.

== Stations ==
The stations proposed in the Phase 2 of Madurai Metro in the Purple Line (Line 3) are as follows:

Purple Line (Line 3)
S.No	Station Name		Interchange connection	Places Connected	Layout	Opened	Depot Connection	Depot Layout
S.No	English	Tamil	Interchange connection	Places Connected	Layout	Opened	Depot Connection	Depot Layout
1	Manalur	மணலூர்	None	None	(TBC)	Proposed Phase 3	Manalur Depot	None
2	Silaiman	சிலைமான்	None	None	(TBC)	Proposed Phase 3	None	None
3	Puliyankulam	புளியங்குளம்	None	None	(TBC)	Proposed Phase 3	None	None
4	Velammal College	வேலம்மாள் கல்லூரி	None	None	(TBC)	Proposed Phase 3	None	None
5	Viraganoor	விரகனூர்	None	None	(TBC)	Proposed Phase 3	None	None
6	Teppakulam	தெப்பக்குளம்	None	None	(TBC)	Proposed Phase 3	None	None
7	Munichalai	முனிச்சாலை	None	None	(TBC)	Proposed Phase 3	None	None
8	Keelavasal	கீழவாசல்	None	None	(TBC)	Proposed Phase 3	None	None
9	Therkuvasal	தெற்குவாசல்	None	Meenakshi Amman Temple South Tower, Thirumalai Nayakkar Mahal, Line 2	Underground	Proposed Phase 3	None	None
10	Madurai Junction	மதுரை சந்திப்பு	Madurai Junction, Periyar Bus Terminus	Meenakshi Amman Temple West Tower, Line 1, Line 2	Underground	Proposed Phase 3	None	None
11	Arasaradi	அரசரடி	None	None	(TBC)	Proposed Phase 3	None	None
12	Arapalayam	ஆரப்பாளையம்	None	None	(TBC)	Proposed Phase 3	None	None
13	Bethaniapuram	பெத்தானியாபுரம்	None	None	(TBC)	Proposed Phase 3	None	None
14	Kalavasal	காளவாசல்	None	None	(TBC)	Proposed Phase 3	None	None
15	HMS Colony	எச்.எம்.எஸ் காலனி	None	None	(TBC)	Proposed Phase 3	None	None
16	Achampattu	அச்சம்பத்து	None	None	(TBC)	Proposed Phase 3	None	None
17	Nagamalai Pudukkottai	நாகமலை புதுக்கோட்டை	None	None	(TBC)	Proposed Phase 3	None	None
18	Vadapalanji	வடபழஞ்சி	None	None	(TBC)	Proposed Phase 3	None	None
19	Chekanurani	செக்கானூரணி	None	None	(TBC)	Proposed Phase 3	None	None

== See also ==
- Madurai Metro
- Transport in Madurai
- List of rapid transit systems in India
- List of metro systems
