= Coimbatore Metro =

Rapid transit system proposed for Coimbatore, India

Overview
- Owner: CMRL
- Area served: Coimbatore
- Locale: Coimbatore, Tamil Nadu, India
- Transit type: Rapid transit
- Number of lines: 2
- Line number: (planned) Red Line (Line 1) Green Line (Line 2)
- Headquarters: Coimbatore metropolitan area

Operation
- Began operation: Proposed
- Operator: Chennai Metro Rail Limited (CMRL)

Technical
- System length: 73 km
- Top speed: 80 km/h (50 mph)

Coimbatore Metro, also known as Kovai Metro, is a proposed rapid transit system for Coimbatore, Tamil Nadu, India.

== History ==
The Indian government proposed a metro rail system for 16 tier-two cities in India, including Coimbatore, in 2010. The Tamil Nadu government opted for a monorail the following year, however, shelving the metro project.

The Coimbatore Railway Struggle Committee has advocated implementing a metro railway system in Coimbatore. Transport expert E. Sreedharan conducted a 2013 survey in Coimbatore, and concluded that a metro rail system would be suitable for the city. In January 2017, a Coimbatore district administration official told The Hindu that no mass rapid transit project was under consideration for Coimbatore.

The state government revived the metro proposal that year, and Railway Minister Suresh Prabhu announced that the national government was prepared to support and fund the project with state approval. Although work was expected to begin in 2017–18, it did not proceed. Tamil Nadu Chief Minister Edappadi K. Palaniswami later announced a metro rail plan for Coimbatore, with a feasibility study and detailed project report (DPR) to be conducted by Chennai Metro Rail Limited (CMRL). Funding would be from the German-based KfW. CMRL issued a tender notice for the preparation of the DPR and feasibility report. The project gathered steam in 2024–25, with CMRL submitting a DPR and Comprehensive Mobility Plan (CMP) to the union government.

== Corridors ==
=== Proposed corridors ===
Coimbatore Metro
Corridor No	Line	From	To	Roads	Via	Length (km)
1	Red Line	Ukkadam Bus Terminus	Karumathampatti	Avinashi Road	Coimbatore Junction, Peelamedu, Coimbatore International Airport	29
2	Green Line	Coimbatore Junction	Valiyampalayam Pirivu	Sathy Road, Siruvani Road	Gandhipuram Central Bus Terminus, Ganapathy Pudur, Saravanampatti	44
Total						73

=== Phase I corridors ===
Coimbatore Metro
Corridor No	Line	From	To	Total Distance (km)	No.of Stations	Status
1	Red Line	Ukkadam Bus Terminus	Neelambur	20.4	18	DPR submitted
2	Green Line	Coimbatore Junction	Valiyampalayam Pirivu	14.4	14	DPR submitted

== Planning ==
=== Phase 1 ===
Phase 1 of the metro was planned to implement two corridors: from Coimbatore Integrated Bus Terminus to Neelambur, and from District Collector Office to Valiyampalayam Pirivu. Covering 44 kilometers, it would cost ₹9,424 crore. The DPR suggested a Metrolite model, but officials said that the decision to make it a Metrolite or to retain it as a metro rests with the state government. With 40 stations planned, Phase 1 will cover transportation hubs in the city such as Coimbatore Integrated Bus Terminus, Coimbatore International Airport, Gandhipuram Central Bus Terminus, Coimbatore Junction, Ukkadam Bus Terminus and Podanur Junction. It will also connect commercial hubs such as Townhall, Ukkadam and Gandhipuram.

=== Phases 2 and 3 ===
The remainder of Corridors 1 and 4 and all of Corridors 2 and 3 are planned to be completed in Phases 2 and 3.

== Timeline ==
- 2011:
  - The Indian government under former Prime Minister Manmohan Singh announces metro rail projects for Tier-II cities, including Coimbatore.
  - The Tamil Nadu government, under former Chief Minister J. Jayalalithaa, shelves the metro rail project in favour of a monorail.
- 2013: E. Sreedharan conducts a survey and announces that metro rail is a suitable transport option for Coimbatore.
- 2017:
  - The Tamil Nadu government, under former Chief Minister Edappadi K. Palaniswami, revives metro rail for Coimbatore.
  - The government announces the beginning of the Coimbatore Metro project by fiscal year 2017-18, with approvals from the state and central governments.
  - Railway Minister Suresh Prabhu announces that the central government is ready to launch and fund the Coimbatore Metro project.
  - The Tamil Nadu government announces that a feasibility study would be conducted and a Detailed Project Report (DPR) prepared for the Coimbatore Metro by Chennai Metro Rail Limited (CMRL), with funding by Germany's KfM.
  - The Tamil Nadu government orders CMRL to float tenders. CMRL releases a tender notice for preparing Coimbatore Metro's DPR and feasibility report.
- 2018:
  - CMRL floats tender for Coimbatore Metro's DPR and feasibility-report preparation.
  - KfW shortlists five firms to prepare the DPR and feasibility study for the Coimbatore Metro.
- 2019:
  - Feasibility study and DPR under preparation by SYSTRA.
  - Feasibility study submitted to the government and is awaiting approval.
  - SYSTRA approaches the district administration and the city municipal corporation with details about development of city and state highways and National Highways Authority of India (NHAI) roads. Based on details provided by the district administration and the corporation, SYSTRA would prepare the DPR.
- 2020:
  - CMRL meets with the Highways Department and Coimbatore corporation officials and discusses implementation of the metro project. A section of the metro route is suggested to be changed because of a clash with the Ukkadam flyover. A metro line is planned to extend to Vellalore to connect to the new bus terminus.
  - A fifth metro line is proposed to connect the proposed Coimbatore Integrated Bus Terminus (CIBT) in Vellalore with Ukkadam.
- 2021:
  - The Tamil Nadu government allocates ₹6,683 crore for the Coimbatore Metro project in the 2021-22 budget.
  - RITES floats a tender for a topographical survey for the project.
  - A site survey begins for the project.
  - A feasibility survey begins.
  - A group of engineers and the MLA of the constituency examines the portion of the metro route which clashes with the under-construction flyover, and an alternative route is sought.
- 2022:
  - The Tamil Nadu government under M. K. Stalin announces metro rail projects for Tier-II cities in the state, including Coimbatore and Madurai.
  - Finance Minister Palanivel Thiagarajan announces that the Detailed Project Report by CMRL is in its final stages, funds will soon be allocated by the central government, and construction will begin.
  - A DPR for phase one of the project is in its final stages. The first phase will be 44 km on Avinashi and Sathyamangalam Roads.
  - An RTI request by Chennai-based activist Dayanad Krishnan revealed that CMRL is expected to complete phase one of the Coimbatore metro project in 2027 at a total cost of ₹9,424 crore.
- 2023:
  - ₹9,000 crore is allotted for the Coimbatore Metro route between Avinashi Road and Sathyamangalam Road in the 2023-24 budget, and the DPR is to be submitted to the Tamil Nadu government.
  - CMRL managing director M. A. Siddique submits a DPR for the metro to Ramesh Chand Meena, Additional Chief Secretary of Special Initiatives. The Tamil Nadu government plans a metro project on Avinashi Road and Sathyamangalam Road in Coimbatore at ₹9,000 crore for 39- and 32-km routes.
- 2024:
  - Siddique says that preliminary work for the metro is planned to start in January and February 2025. Land acquisition for the project is underway.
- 2025
  - The Union Government of India returned the metro proposals for Madurai and Coimbatore, citing the population of both cities as less than 20 lakh. However, the Tamil Nadu government raised concerns about what it called an “uneven application” of the Centre’s Metro Rail Policy, pointing out that cities such as Agra, Patna, and Bhopal despite having populations below this threshold, had been approved for metro projects.

== See also ==
- Chennai Metro
- Kochi Metro
- Madurai Metro
- List of Coimbatore Metro stations
