= Ukkadam Flyover =

Road junction in Coimbatore, India

Ukkadam Flyover Flyover
- உக்கடம் மேம்பாலம் Ukkadam-Aathupalam flyover

Location
- Coimbatore, India
- Roads at junction: Palakkad road Sungam Bypass Road; Oppanakara Street; Perur Bypass Road

Construction
- Type: Overpass Flyover
- Lanes: 4
- Constructed: ( Under Construction )

Ukkadam Flyover also known as Ukkadam-Aathupalam flyover is a 2.5 km long flyover under construction in the city of Coimbatore.

== Background ==
The foundation stone for the flyover was laid in 2019. The flyover is designed to ease the traffic congestion caused in Ukkadam and Aathupalam junctions.

== Planning ==
The flyover begins at the western end of Oppanakara Street near the Ukkadam signal and proceeds towards Aathupalam junction via Karumbukadai and will bifurcate into two branches- one on the Pollachi Road and Palakkad Road. The flyover will have an exit and entry ramp on the Sungam bypass road.

== See also ==
- Flyovers in Coimbatore
- Avinashi Road Expressway, Coimbatore
