= Line 2 (Madurai Metro) =

Proposed Transit line in Madurai, India

Green Line (Line 2)

Overview
- Status: DPR to be Planned
- Termini: Kattapuli Nagar; Madurai International Airport
- Stations: 14

Service
- Type: Rapid transit
- System: Madurai Metro
- Operator: CMRL

History
- Planned opening: To be proposed

Technical
- Line length: 20 km (12 mi)
- Number of tracks: 2
- Operating speed: 60 km/h (37 mph)

The Green Line (Line 2) is one of the three proposed lines of Madurai Metro which is to be implemented at the Phase 2 of Madurai Metro. The line stretches from Kattapuli Nagar to Madurai Airport. The line consists of 14 stations.

== Stations ==
The stations proposed in the Phase 2 of Madurai Metro in the Green Line (Line 2) are as follows:-

Green Line (Line 2)
S.No	Station Name		Interchange connection	Places Connected	Layout	Opened	Depot Connection	Depot Layout
S.No	English	Tamil	Interchange connection	Places Connected	Layout	Opened	Depot Connection	Depot Layout
1	Kattapuli Nagar	கட்டப்புலி நகர்	None	None	(TBC)	Proposed Phase 2	Kattapuli Nagar Depot	None
2	Samayanallur	சமயநல்லூர்	None	None	(TBC)	Proposed Phase 2	None	None
3	Athisayam Park	அதிசயம் பூங்கா	None	None	(TBC)	Proposed Phase 2	None	None
4	Paravai	பரவை	None	None	(TBC)	Proposed Phase 2	None	None
5	Vilangudi	விளாங்குடி	None	None	(TBC)	Proposed Phase 2	None	None
6	Fatima College	பாத்திமா கல்லூரி	None	None	(TBC)	Proposed Phase 2	None	None
7	Thathaneri	தத்தனேரி	None	None	(TBC)	Proposed Phase 2	None	None
8	Sellur	செல்லூர்	None	None	(TBC)	Proposed Phase 2	None	None
9	Madurai Junction	மதுரை சந்திப்பு	Madurai Junction, Periyar Bus Terminus	Meenakshi Amman Temple West Tower, Line 1, Line 3	Underground	Proposed Phase 2	None	None
10	Therukuvasal	தெற்குவாசல்	None	Meenakshi Amman Temple South Tower, Thirumalai Nayakkar Mahal, Line 3	Underground	Proposed Phase 2	None	None
11	Villapuram	வில்லாபுரம்	None	None	(TBC)	Proposed Phase 2	None	None
12	Avaniapuram	அவனியாபுரம்	None	None	(TBC)	Proposed Phase 2	None	None
13	Perungudi	பெருங்குடி	None	None	(TBC)	Proposed Phase 2	None	None
14	Madurai International Airport	விமான நிலையம்	None	Madurai International Airport	(TBC)	Proposed Phase 2	None	None

== See also ==
- Madurai Metro
- Transport in Madurai
- List of rapid transit systems in India
- List of metro systems
