= Line 1 (Coimbatore Metro) =

Transit line in Coimbatore, India

Red Line

Overview
- Status: Proposed
- Termini: Ukkadam Bus Terminus; Neelambur
- Stations: 18

Service
- Type: Rapid transit
- System: Coimbatore Metro

Technical
- Line length: 20.4 km (12.7 mi)
- Number of tracks: 2
- Character: 18 km Elevated
- Operating speed: 80 km/h (50 mph)

The Red Line or Line 1 is one of the two proposed lines of Coimbatore Metro, Phase 1 Project, the second being the Green line (Line 2). The line stretches from Ukkadam Bus Terminus to Neelambur. The line consists of 18 stations, out of which the Coimbatore Airport station has a spill off line.

== Stations ==
The stations proposed in the first phase of Coimbatore Metro in the Line-1 are:

Red Line
S.No	Station Name		Interchange connection	Places Connected	Layout	Opened	Depot Connection	Depot Layout
S.No	English	Tamil	Interchange connection	Places Connected	Layout	Opened	Depot Connection	Depot Layout
1	Ukkadam Bus Terminus	உக்கடம் பேருந்து முனையம்	Intercity Bus terminus	Ukkadam Bus Terminus	Elevated	Proposed Phase 1	None	None
2	Townhall	நகர் மண்டபம்	None	CMC Central Office, Oppanakara Street	Elevated	Proposed Phase 1	None	None
3	Coimbatore Junction	கோயம்புத்தூர் சந்திப்பு	Green Line, Coimbatore Junction railway station	Coimbatore Government Hospital	Elevated	Proposed Phase 1	None	None
4	Collectorate	மாவட்ட ஆட்சியர் அலுவலகம்	None	Coimbatore District Collector Office	Elevated	Proposed Phase 1	None	None
5	GKNM Hospital	ஜி.கே.என்.எம் மருத்துவமனை	None	None	Elevated	Proposed Phase 1	None	None
6	Lakshmi Mills	லட்சுமி மில்ஸ்	None	None	Elevated	Proposed Phase 1	None	None
7	Nava India	நவ இந்தியா	None	None	Elevated	Proposed Phase 1	None	None
8	Peelamedu Pudur	பீளமேடு புதூர்	Peelamedu railway station	PSG College of Technology, PSG Hospitals	Elevated	Proposed Phase 1	None	None
9	Fun Republic Mall	பன் மால்	None	Fun Republic Mall	Elevated	Proposed Phase 1	None	None
10	Hope College	ஹோப் காலேஜ்	None	TIDEL Park	Elevated	Proposed Phase 1	None	None
11	Coimbatore Medical College	கோவை மருத்துவக் கல்லூரி	None	Coimbatore Medical College	Elevated	Proposed Phase 1	None	None
12	SITRA Circle	சித்ரா	None	None	Elevated	Proposed Phase 1	None	None
13	MGR Nagar	எம்.ஜி.ஆர். நகர்	None	None	Elevated	Proposed Phase 1	None	None
14	PLS Nagar	பி.எல்.எஸ் நகர்	None	None	Elevated	Proposed Phase 1	None	None
15	Venkittapuram	வெங்கிட்டாபுரம்	None	None	Elevated	Proposed Phase 1	None	None
16	Park Plaza	பார்க் பிளாசா	None	None	Elevated	Proposed Phase 1	None	None
17	Neelambur	நீலம்பூர்	None	None	Elevated	Proposed Phase 1	Neelambur Depot	Under Proposal
18	Coimbatore International Airport	கோயம்புத்தூர் பன்னாட்டு வானூர்தி நிலையம்	Coimbatore International Airport	None	Elevated	Proposed Phase 1	None	None

== See also ==
- Line 2 (Coimbatore Metro)
- Coimbatore Metro
- Transport in Coimbatore
- List of rapid transit systems in India
- List of metro systems
