= Coimbatore Junction Metro station =

Coimbatore Metro Planned Interchange station

Coimbatore Junction Metro

General information
- Other names: Coimbatore Junction Metro
- System: Coimbatore Metro station
- Tracks: 4

Construction
- Structure type: Elevated
- Platform levels: 2

Coimbatore Junction Metro, is a planned elevated metro station in Coimbatore, India. It would serve the Red Line, Yellow Line, Blue Line and Green Line lines of the Coimbatore Metro.

== The Station ==
It is planned as a two-storeyed elevated metro hub within the premises of Coimbatore Junction.

== See also ==
- Transport in Coimbatore
- Urban rail transit in India
- List of Coimbatore metro stations
- Railway stations in Coimbatore
