= Athar Jamad Mosque =

Mosque in Coimbatore, Tamil Nadu, India

Athar Jamad Mosque (The Big Mosque)
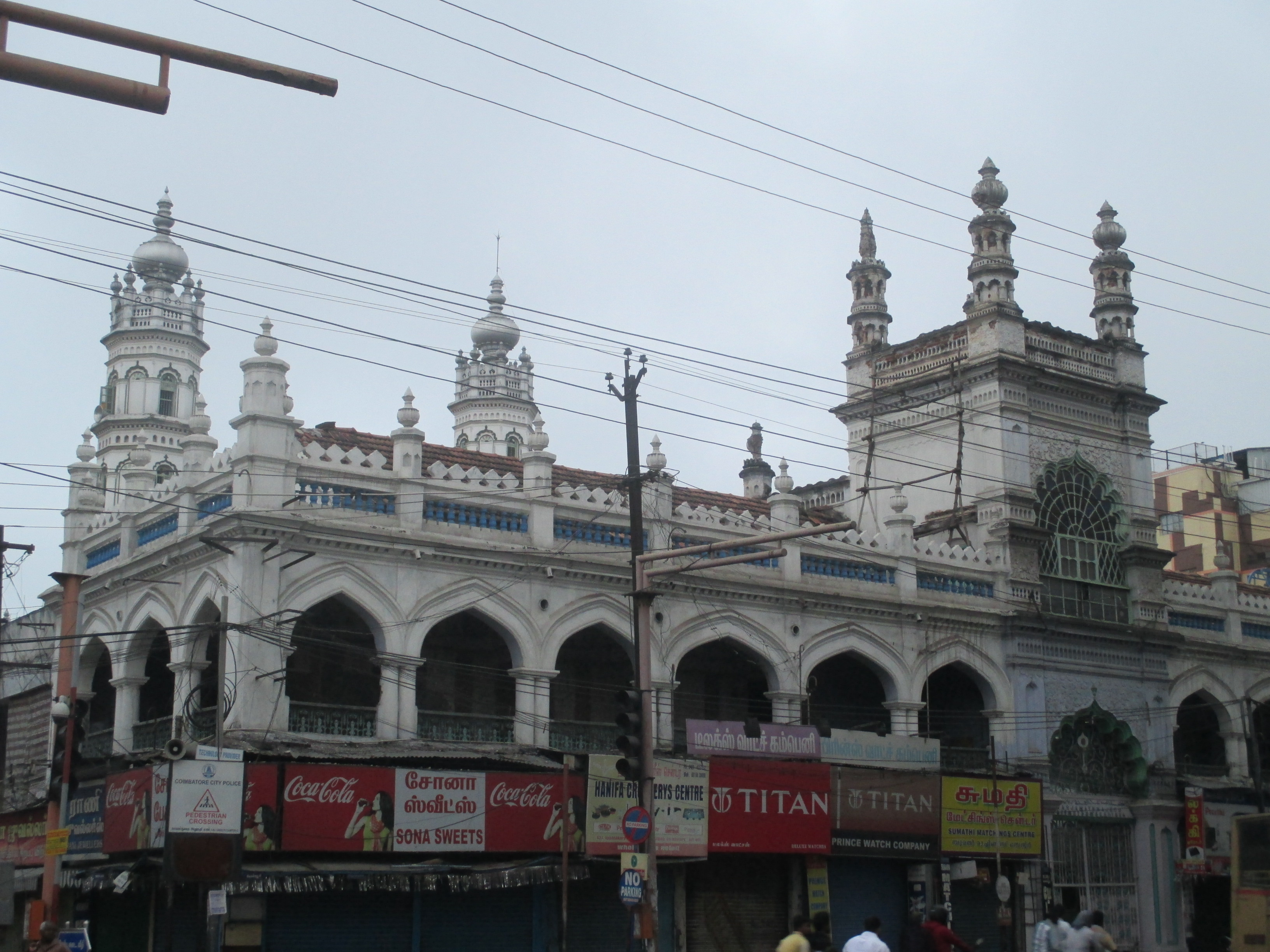
- The mosque in 2015

- Location of the mosque in Tamil Nadu

Religion
- Affiliation: Islam
- Ecclesiastical or organisational status: Mosque
- Status: Active

Location
- Location: Oppanakara Street, Coimbatore, Tamil Nadu
- Country: India
- Coordinates: 10°59′37″N 76°57′37″E

Architecture
- Type: Mosque architecture
- Groundbreaking: 1860
- Completed: 1904

Specifications
- Capacity: 2,000 worshipers
- Dome: Two (maybe more)
- Minaret: Four
- Minaret height: 26 m (85 ft)
- Materials: Limestone; mortar

The Athar Jamad Mosque (Arabic: اثار جماعة المسجد; Tamil: அத்தார் ஜமாத் மஸ்ஜித்), also known as the Athar Jamaath Masjid and colloquially as The Big Mosque, is a mosque located on Oppanakara Street within the Coimbatore district of the state of Tamil Nadu, India. It is one of the oldest and biggest mosques in Coimbatore.

== Architecture ==
A perfume merchant named Athar, who migrated from Tirunelveli, built the structure. It took 44 years to complete, with construction beginning in 1860 and finishing in 1904.

The structure is made of limestone and mortar and polished with egg white. The façade is covered with cusped arches surrounding the open courtyard, where the prayer halls stand. There is a covered wudu pond in the southeastern corner, a small library on the eastern side, and a kitchen for the preparation of nonbu kanji (rice soup) during Ramadan. Hawkers line the entrance with amulets and items of worship.

According to the Indian National Trust for Art and Cultural Heritage (INTACH), the two minars with domed roofs on the northern and southern sides are 26 metres (85 ft) high. This pair of silver domes stand out in the skyline of the Town Hall area. The mosque can accommodate approximately 2,000 worshippers during Friday prayers.

== Dargah ==
The mosque is built beside the tomb of Pir Jamesha Waliullah, a Sufi Waliullah who died in the 1850s. His tomb, which is now a dargah in the middle of Big Bazaar Street, is on the southern side of the masjid. Visitors are blessed inside the dargah with amulets tied around their necks to ward off evil spirits.

== Following ==
The Jamaat comprises the descendants of the 52 families from Tirunelveli that moved to Coimbatore in 1850. According to Jamaat secretary A.R. Baserdeen, 1,355 members are now alive. The Jamaat's elected executive committee manages the mosque, as well as Jamesha Waliullah dargah on Big Bazaar Street, Jungal Pir dargah on Trichy road, and the Cemetery Masjid beside Coimbatore Junction. The committee also runs three schools in the area which serve 1,200 students.

During Ramadan and Bakrid, crowds flock to the mosque and dargah.

Worshipers at the Hindu Koniamman Temple, parade by the mosque annually. To promote harmony between Muslims and Hindus, in 2020 representatives of the mosque handed 5,000 water bottles to Hindus.

== See also ==
- Islam in India
- List of mosques in India
