= Line 1 (Madurai Metro) =

Transit line in Madurai, India

Red Line (Line 1)

Overview
- Status: Proposed
- Termini: Tirumangalam; Othakadai
- Stations: 23

Service
- Type: Rapid transit
- System: Madurai Metro

Technical
- Line length: 31 km (19 mi)
- Number of tracks: 2
- Operating speed: 60 km/h (37 mph)

The Red Line (Line 1) is one of the three proposed lines of Madurai Metro and the only line which is to be implemented at the Phase 1 of Madurai Metro. The line stretches from Tirumangalam to Othakadai. The line consists of 20 stations.

== Stations ==
The stations proposed in the Phase 1 of Madurai Metro in the Red Line (Line 1) are as follows:-

Red Line (Line 1)
S.No	Station Name		Interchange connection	Places Connected	Layout	Opened	Depot Connection	Depot Layout
S.No	English	Tamil	Interchange connection	Places Connected	Layout	Opened	Depot Connection	Depot Layout
1	Tirumangalam	திருமங்கலம்	Tirumangalam railway station	None	Elevated	Proposed Phase 1	Tirumangalam Depot	None
2	Kappalur Toll Plaza	கப்பலூர் சுங்கச்சாவடி	None	None	Elevated	Proposed Phase 1	None	None
3	Dharmathupatti	தர்மத்துப்பட்டி	None	None	Elevated	Proposed Phase 1	None	None
4	Thoppur	தோப்பூர்	None	AIIMS Madurai	Elevated	Proposed Phase 1	None	None
5	Thanakankulam	தனக்கன்குளம்	None	None	Elevated	Proposed Phase 1	None	None
6	Thirunagar	திருநகர்	None	None	Elevated	Proposed Phase 1	None	None
7	Thiruparankundram	திருப்பரங்குன்றம்	Tiruparankundram railway station	Thiruparankundram Murugan Temple	Elevated	Proposed Phase 1	None	None
8	Pasumalai	பசுமலை	None	None	Elevated	Proposed Phase 1	None	None
9	Vasantha Nagar	வசந்த நகர்	None	None	Underground	Proposed Phase 1	None	None
10	Madura College	மதுரை கல்லூரி	None	None	Underground	Proposed Phase 1	None	None
11	Madurai Junction	மதுரை சந்திப்பு	Madurai Junction, Periyar Bus Terminus	Meenakshi Amman Temple West Tower, Line 2, Line 3	Underground	Proposed Phase 1	None	None
12	Therkuvasal	தெற்குவாசல்	None	Meenakshi Amman Temple South Tower	Underground	Proposed Phase 1	None	None
13	Keezhavasal	கிழவாசல்	None	Meenakshi Amman Temple East Tower, Thirumalai Nayakkar Mahal	Underground	Proposed Phase 1	None	None
14	Simmakkal	சிம்மக்கல்	None	Simmakkal Market	Underground	Proposed Phase 1	None	None
15	Goripalayam	கோரிப்பாளையம்	None	Government Rajaji Hospital	Underground	Proposed Phase 1	None	None
16	Police Commissioner's Office	புறக்காவல் நிலையம்	None	City Police Commissioner Office	Elevated	Proposed Phase 1	None	None
17	K.Pudur	K.புதூர்	None	None	Elevated	Proposed Phase 1	None	None
18	Mattuthavani	மாட்டுத்தாவணி	MGR Bus Terminus	Mattuthavani Integrated Market	Elevated	Proposed Phase 1	None	None
19	Uthangudi	உத்தங்குடி	None	None	Elevated	Proposed Phase 1	None	None
20	High Court Bench	உயர்நீதிமன்ற கிளை	None	None	Elevated	Proposed Phase 1	None	None
21	Othakkadai	ஒத்தக்கடை	None	None	Elevated	Proposed Phase 1	None	None
22	ACRI Madurai	விவசாய கல்லூரி	None	None	Elevated	Proposed Phase 1	None	None
23	Chittampatti Junction	சித்தம்பட்டி சந்திப்பு	None	None	Elevated	Proposed Phase 1	None	None

== See also ==
- Madurai Metro
- Transport in Madurai
- List of rapid transit systems in India
- List of metro systems
