= Prozone Mall, Aurangabad =

- Location: Aurangabad, Maharashtra, India
- Coordinates: 19°52′34″N 75°22′20″E
- Address: Prozone Mall, API compound, Chikalthana
- Developer: Prozone Enterprises Pvt. Ltd
- Floor area: 1,000,000 sq ft (93,000 m^{2})
- Floors: Ground + 1
- Parking: 1500 cars +1500 2 wheelers
- Website: www.prozonemalls.com/aurangabad

Prozone Mall, Aurangabad is one of the largest, as well as one of the first horizontally designed shopping malls in India. It has over 600,000 sq ft (56,000 m^{2}) of retail space and was the first modern mall in Aurangabad, Maharashtra.

== Overview ==
Prozone Aurangabad, designed to be a 'horizontal mall' on the lines of international developments, is spread over 20 acres (8.1 ha). It is a two floor (ground + 1st level) structure. The mall was inaugurated on 8 October 2010 by Hrithik Roshan.

Prozone Aurangabad has more than 150 retail stores selling top local and international brands, a five-screen cinema complex, 40,000 sq ft (3,700 m^{2}) family entertainment centre and 3000 parking bays. There are also plans to build an office complex above the centre. A business-class hotel will be constructed to complement the precinct. Additionally, high rise apartments and row bungalows are constructed parallel to the mall.

== Anchor tenants ==
Inox Cineplexes operates a five screen multiplex at Prozone.

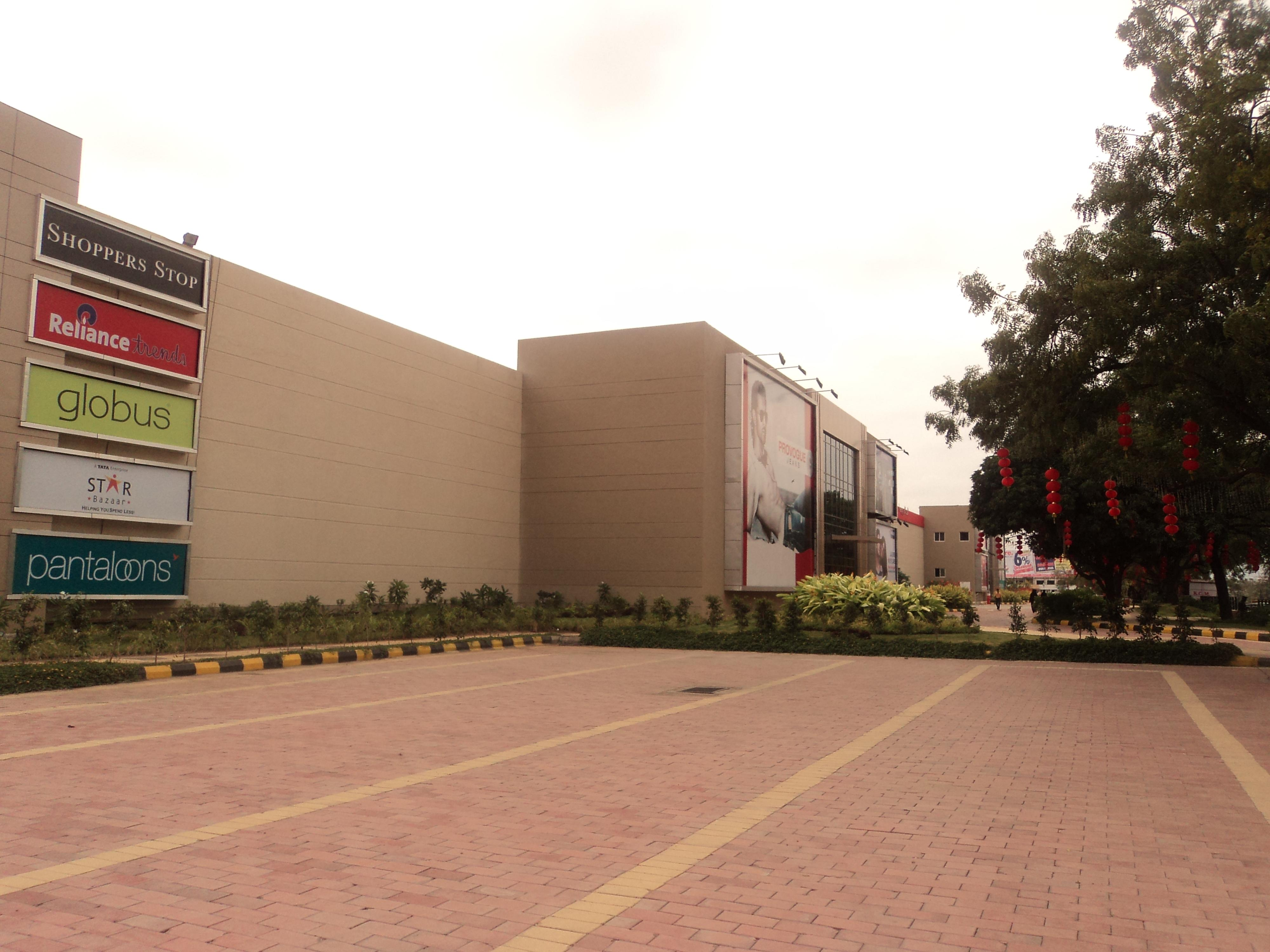
Prozone Mall Aurangabad

== See also ==
- Prozone Mall, Coimbatore
