= Prozone Mall, Coimbatore =

- Location: Coimbatore, Tamil Nadu, India
- Coordinates: 11.0552°N 76.9939°E
- Address: Sivanandhapuram, Saravanampatti
- Opened: July 2017
- Developer: Prozone Enterprises Pvt. Ltd
- Architect: Bentel Associates International
- Num. of stores: 160
- Floor area: 500,000 sq ft (46,000 m^{2})
- Floors: Ground+1
- Parking: 2,500 vehicles
- Website: prozonemalls.com/coimbatore

Prozone Mall, Coimbatore is one of the largest horizontally designed shopping malls in India, covering over 500,000 sq ft (46,000 m^{2}). It was opened on 19 July 2017 at Sivanandapuram, Saravanampatti Road, Coimbatore. It has some attracting places like Inox, Fun unlimited, etc.

== Facilities ==
The mall has:

- Outlets from major clothing and apparel brands.
- 09 screens INOX
- A food court
- A CRA SPEEDWAY Go-kart track on the roof.

The mall is located near Saravanampatti, one of Coimbatore's faster-growing neighborhoods due to an influx of IT companies. It covers 12 acres (4.9 ha) of land on Sathy Road. The mall's large tenants include H&M and Spar stores.

== History ==
The mall was constructed by Prozone Intu Pvt. Ltd. and designed by Bentel Architects of South Africa. It is promoted by the UK-based Intu Properties Plc and Prozone.

== See also ==
- Prozone Mall, Aurangabad
