= Palakkad Road, Coimbatore =

Arterial road in Coimbatore, India

Palakkad Road
- Native name: பாலக்காடு சாலை (Tamil)
- Maintained by: National Highways Authority of India; Coimbatore City Municipal Corporation
- Length: 7 mi (11 km)
- north end: Aathupalam, Coimbatore
- Major junctions: Puttuvikki Road/Kurichi Road(Kuniyamuthur); Edayarpalayam Pirivu; Kovaipudur Pirivu; Madukkarai; Marapalam
- To: L&T Bypass Signal, Ettimadai, Coimbatore

Palakkad Road, is an arterial road in Coimbatore, India. This road connects the city to Palakkad and the state of Kerala and the south-west suburbs in the Coimbatore metropolitan area.

== Description ==
Palakkad Road is the main gateway into the city by road from Palakkad, Thrissur, Ernakulam and Walayar. This road is a part of National highways 544 (Salem - Kochin Highway) is now maintained by the National Highways Authority of India. This road is a 7-km stretch of road running diagonally across the city in east–west orientation. Pollachi road starts near to Aathupalam in Karumbukkadai, and it passes through the important neighbourhoods of Kuniyamuthur, Marapalam and Madukkarai.

== Alignment ==
The road is a two lane road in most stretches.

== Traffic congestion ==
The road was previously part of the NH-47 maintained by the National Highways Authority of India. The L&T Bypass was opened in 2000 from Neelambur to Madukkarai, thereby decongesting the Palakkad road.

The Western bypass is proposed as well to decongest the road.

== Places transversed ==
- Aathupalam Junction
- Kuniyamuthur junction
- Edayarpalayam Pirivu junction
- Madukkarai junction
- L&T Bypass Signal junction

== Major Educational Institutions ==
- Nehru Group of Institutions

== Major Hospitals ==
- KJ Hospitals
