= Saravanampatti =

Neighbourhood Coimbatore, Tamil Nadu, India

- Neighbourhood
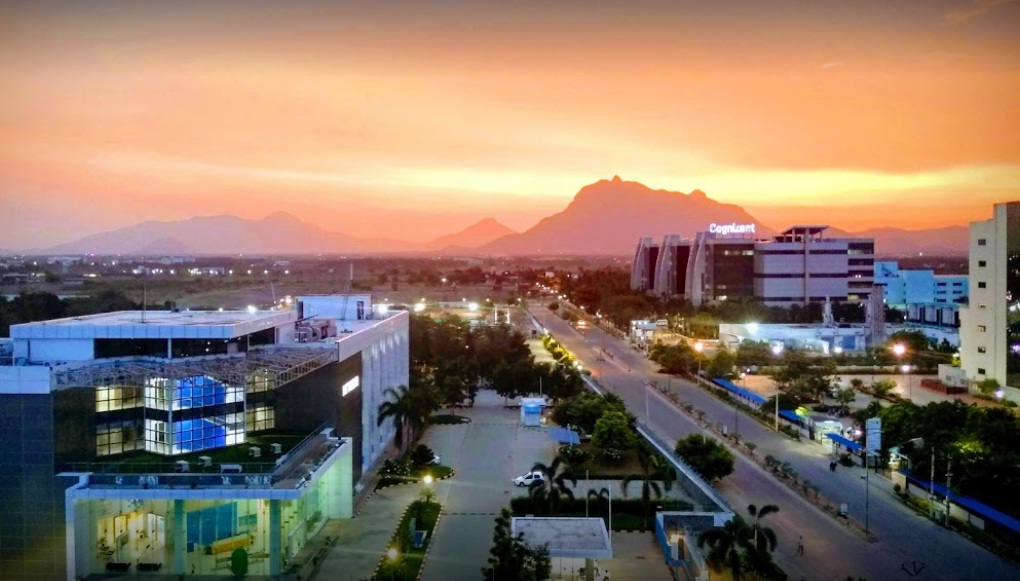
- CHIL Special Economic Zone at Saravanampatti

- Location in Tamil Nadu, India
- Coordinates: 11°05′24″N 76°59′52″E
- Country: India
- State: Tamil Nadu
- District: Coimbatore
- Taluk: Coimbatore North

Area
  - Total: 11.8 km^{2} (4.6 sq mi)

Population (2011)
  - Total: 32,920
  - Density: 2,790/km^{2} (7,230/sq mi)

Languages
  - Official: Tamil
- Time zone: UTC+5:30 (IST)
- PIN: 641035,641049
- Telephone code: 91–422
- Vehicle registration: TN-38
- Lok Sabha constituency: Coimbatore
- Vidhan Sabha constituency: Kavundampalayam

Saravanampatti is a neighborhood of the Coimbatore in the Indian state of Tamil Nadu. It is part of the Coimbatore North taluk. It was a panchayat town till 2011, when it was incorporated into the Coimbatore Corporation. Spread across an area of 11.8 km^{2} (4.6 sq mi), it had a population of 32,920 individuals as per the 2011 census.

== Geography and administration ==
Saravanampatti is located in Coimbatore North taluk of Coimbatore district in the Indian state of Tamil Nadu. Spread across an area of 11.8 km^{2} (4.6 sq mi), it is located along the Sathy Road, one of the arterial roads in the city. It was a panchayat town till 2011, when it was incorporated into the Coimbatore Corporation. The locality forms part of the Kavundampalayam Assembly constituency that elects its member to the Tamil Nadu legislative assembly and the Coimbatore Lok Sabha constituency that elects its member to the Parliament of India. The proposed Coimbatore Metro has a corridor that will pass through the region.

== Demographics ==
As per the 2011 census, Saravanampatti had a population of 32,920 individuals across 9,284 households. The population saw a significant increase compared to the previous census in 2001 when 17,737 inhabitants were registered. The population consisted of 16,507 males and 16,413 females. About 3,454 individuals were below the age of six years. The entire population is classified as urban. The town has an average literacy rate of 91.5%. About 5.7% of the population belonged to scheduled castes. Hinduism was the majority religion which was followed by 90.7% of the population, with Christianity (7.7%) and Islam (1.6%) being minor religions.

About 44.3% of the eligible population were employed full-time. The CHIL Special Economic Zone is home to various Information Technology companies, and is a major employment provider and economic driver of the region.

Brigade Enterprises' first residential project Brigade Saravanampatti in Coimbatore. 5.4-acre JDA development with an estimated GDV of ₹600 crore.
