= Transport in Madurai =

Madurai in Southern Tamil Nadu, India, has well-developed transport facilities. Modes of transport in Madurai include road, rail and air. Madurai faces increasing daily traffic problems, so master plans have been prepared to reduce the city traffic and traffic problems in suburbs.

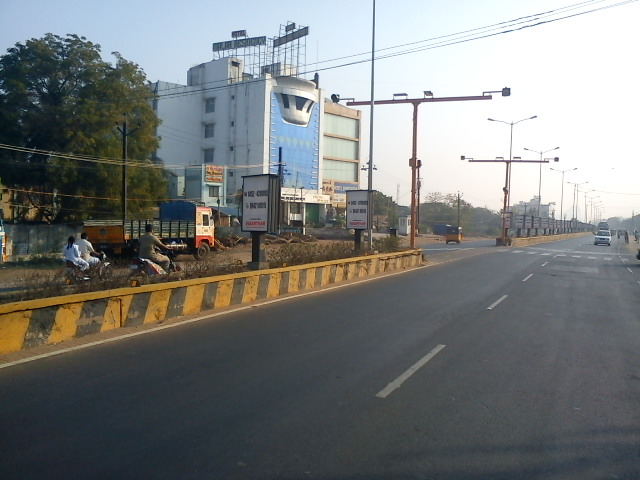
Mattuthavani High Road

== Road ==
Madurai is located in the southern part of Tamil Nadu. It is the third largest city in Tamil Nadu and connects the southern districts to northern districts in Tamil Nadu, and is one of the major transportation hubs in Tamil Nadu. The floating population is much heavier in the city . Most of the people from southern districts visit for medical, educational, marketing, cargo, shopping, tourism or official purposes. It is one of the important traffic circles in Tamil Nadu.

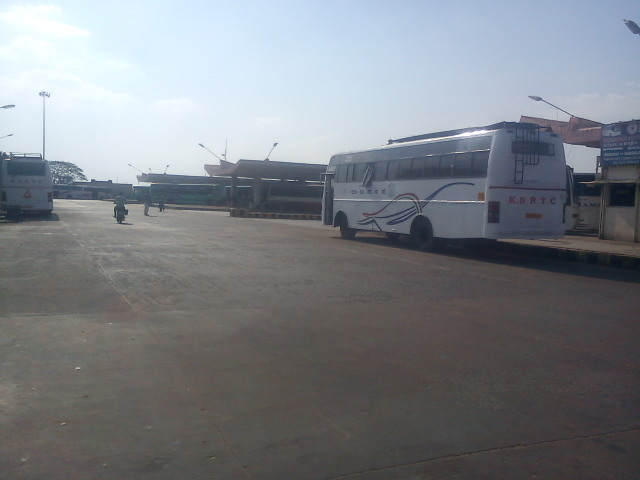
M.G.R Bus Stand

There are 30,126 registered three-wheeled vehicles called auto rickshaws, which are commercially available for renting within the city. In addition to the government operated city buses that are used for public transport, there are 236 registered private mini-buses that support local transportation. Madurai connects with the following major national highways;

Road	No	Route
National Highway	7	Kanyakumari - Tirunelveli - Madurai City - Salem - Bengaluru - Varanasi
National Highway	45 B	Thoothukudi - Madurai - Trichy - Viluppuram - Chennai (Grand southern Trunk Road)
National Highway	49	Rameswaram - Thiruppuvanam - Madurai - Kochi
National Highway	85	Thondi - Sivagangai - Madurai - Theni - Kochi (Point Highway)
National Highway	208	Madurai - Rajapalayam - Tenkasi - Sengottai - Kollam

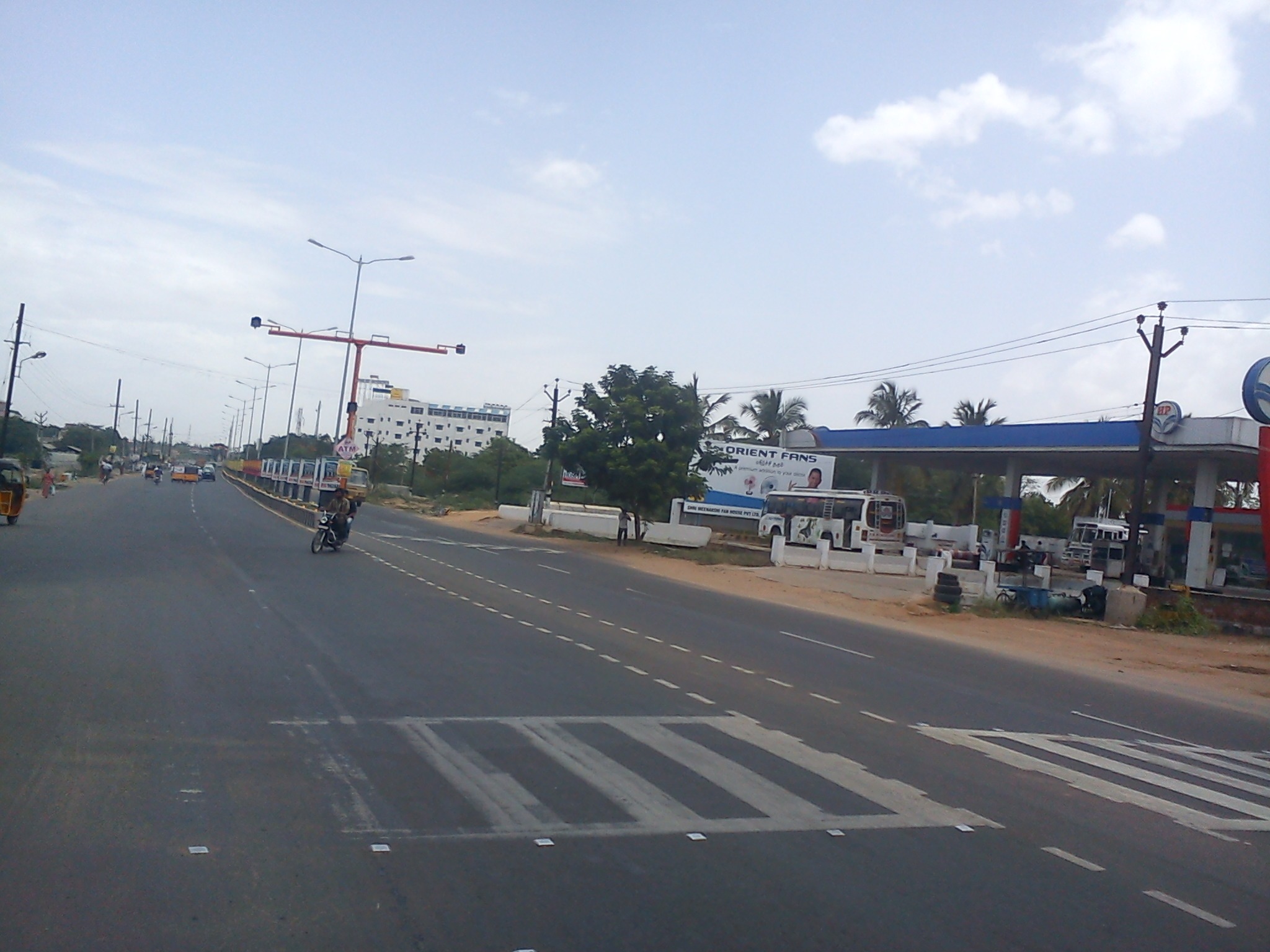
M.G.R Bus Stand High Road

The state highways passing through the city are SH-32, SH-33 and SH-72, which connect various parts of Madurai district. Madurai is one of the seven circles of the Tamil Nadu State Highway network, is the headquarters of the Tamil Nadu State Transport Corporation (Madurai) and provides local and inter-city bus transport across four districts, namely Madurai, Dindigul, Theni, and Virudhunagar. The Netaji Subhas Chandra Bose Flyover, an 1.3 km long overpass, was inaugurated in 2026 by the chief minister of Tamil Nadu, M. K. Stalin, and aims to ease the traffic congestion at Goripalayam.

=== City bus service ===
Madurai city has the best city bus service second only to Chennai. The major city areas are connected by Madurai city bus service, operated by TNSTC (Madurai). Most of the buses, like Ashok leyland and TATA Marcopolo, are equipped with LED Displays and some of the Pseudo SLF buses are equipped with GPS which announce the bus stops for passengers. The city buses are available during day time, but some important areas have city bus services all day long (unlike other regions).

The Madurai Bus Rapid Transit System will plays a vital role in public transportation in the city of Madurai. It will increase the frequency of busses and reduces the travelling time.

Madurai city has major city bus stands and originating terminals such as;

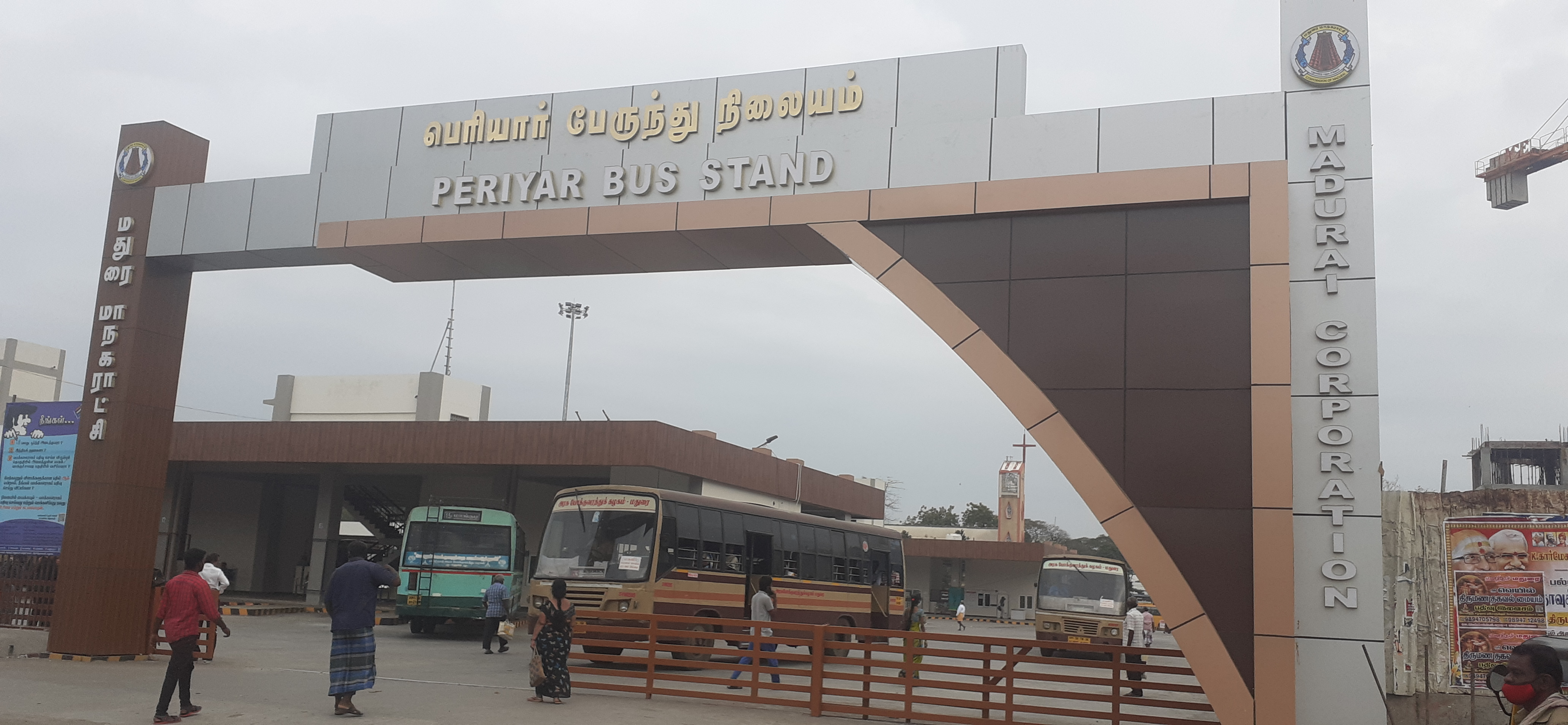
- Periyar Bus stand
  Periyar bus stand Madurai Central
- Anna Nagar Bus Stand Madurai East
- Anuppanadi Bus Stand Madurai East
- K. Pudur Bus Stand Madurai North
- Palanganatham Bus stand Madurai South
- Thiruparakundram Bus Stand Madurai South
- Thirunagar Bus Stand Madurai South
- Thirumangalam Bus stand Madurai Suburb
- Melur Bus stand Madurai North East
- Parktown Bus stand Madurai North
- Vadipatti Bus stand Madurai West
- M.G Road Bus Stand Madurai North
- Anaiyur Bus Stand Madurai North
- Vandiyur Bus Stand Madurai South
- Peraiyur Bus stand Madurai Suburb
- T. Kallupatti Bus stand Madurai Suburb
- Usilampatti Bus stand Madurai Suburb
- Elumalai Bus stand Madurai Suburb
- Thiruppalai Bus stand Madurai North
- Alanganallur Bus stand Madurai Suburb
- Palamedu Bus stand Madurai Suburb
- Azhagar kovil Bus stand Madurai North
- Sholavandan Bus stand Madurai Suburb
- Kottambatti Bus stand Madurai Suburb
- MGR Bus Stand (Mattuthavani) Madurai North
- Arappalayam Bus stand Madurai North
- Ellis Nagar Bus stand Madurai North
- Madurai International Airport Bus Stand Madurai South

=== Mofussil Bus service ===
Madurai has two important mofussil bus terminus;

- M.G.R Bus Stand
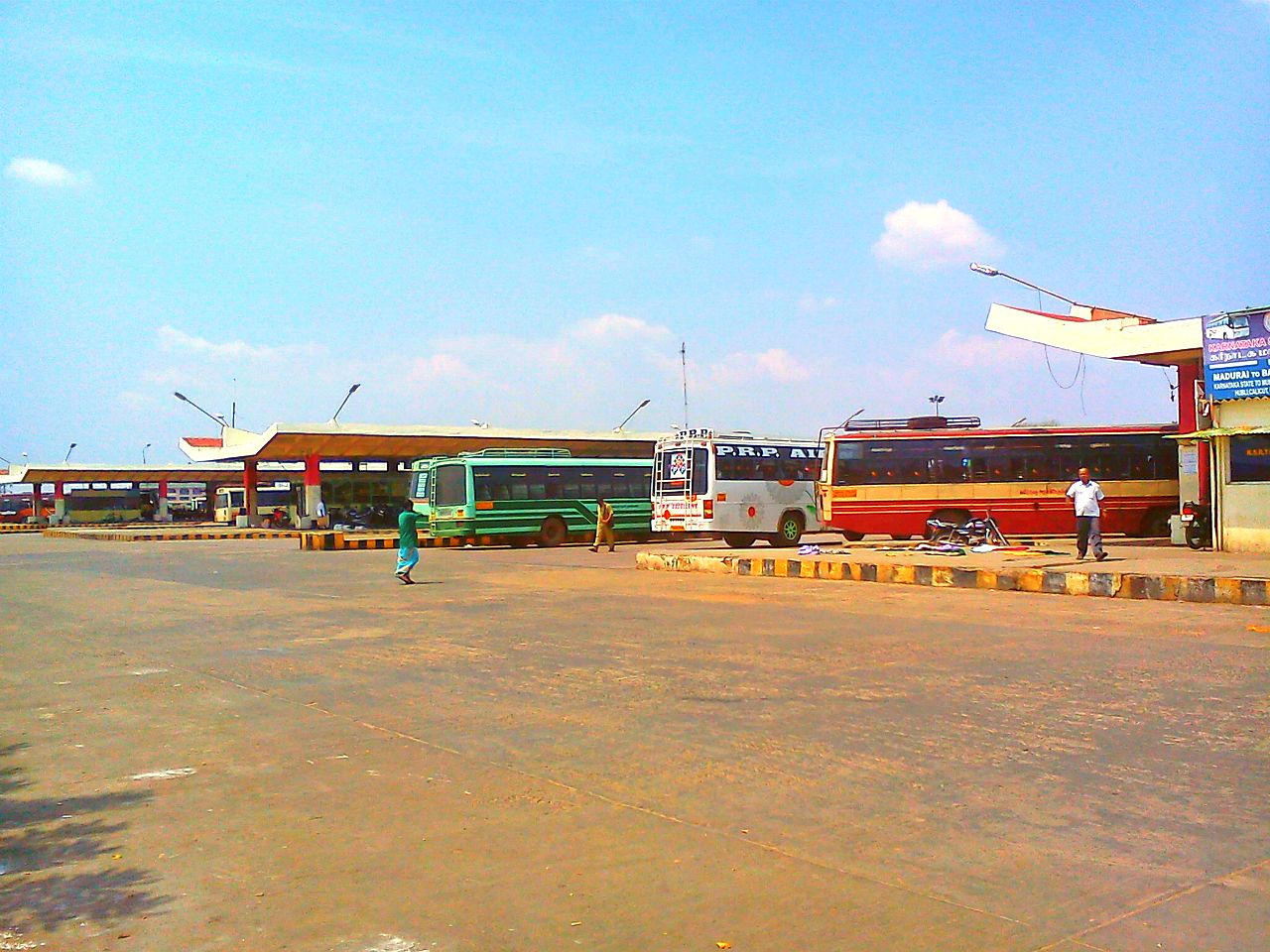
  M.G.R Bus Stand
- Arappalayam Bus Terminus

==== M.G.R Bus Stand ====
M.G.R Bus Stand is an ISO 9001:2000 certified integrated mofussil bus stand in the city of Madurai, Tamil Nadu, India and it is the second largest bus terminus in Tamil Nadu. It is the second busiest mofussil bus terminus in Tamil Nadu after CMBT. The bus station was built at the cost of R100 million.^{[1]} After the successful launch of this new bus stand, more mofussil buses are being operated to the southern districts of Tirunelveli, Thoothukudi, Virudhunagar, Kanyakumari, Ramanathapuram, Sivaganga and Northern districts like Chennai, Vellore, Trichy, Viluppuram, Perambalur, Pudukkottai, Kumbakonam Thanjavur, Tiruvarur, Nagapattinam, Cuddalore, Tiruvannamalai from the station.

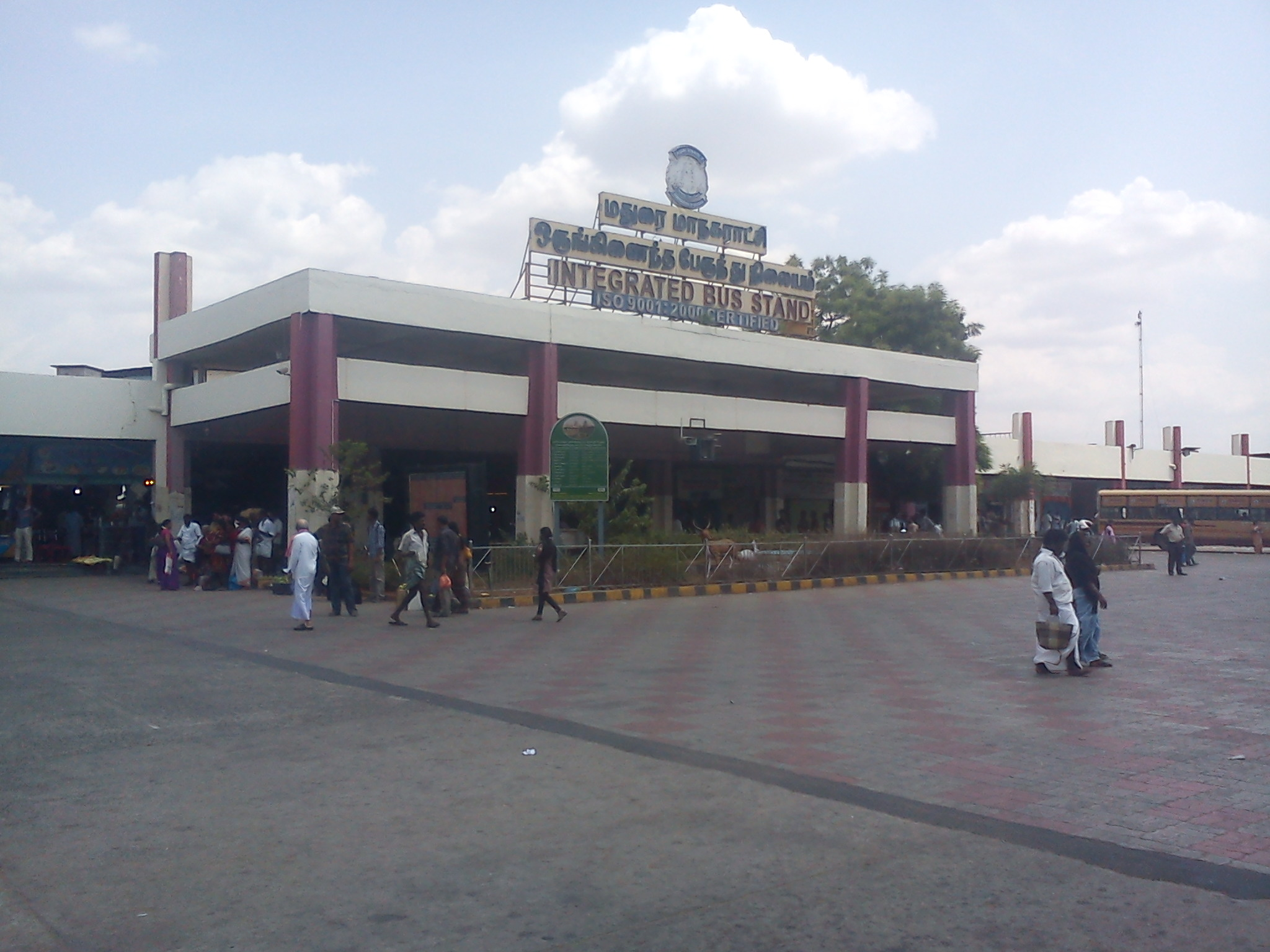
M.G.R Bus Stand Entrance

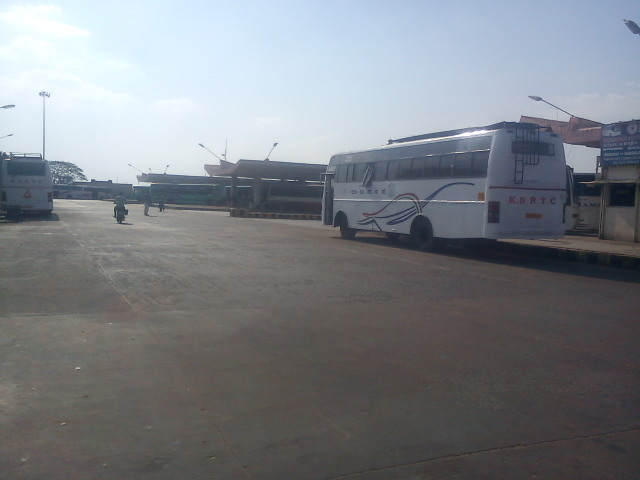
M.G.R Bus Stand

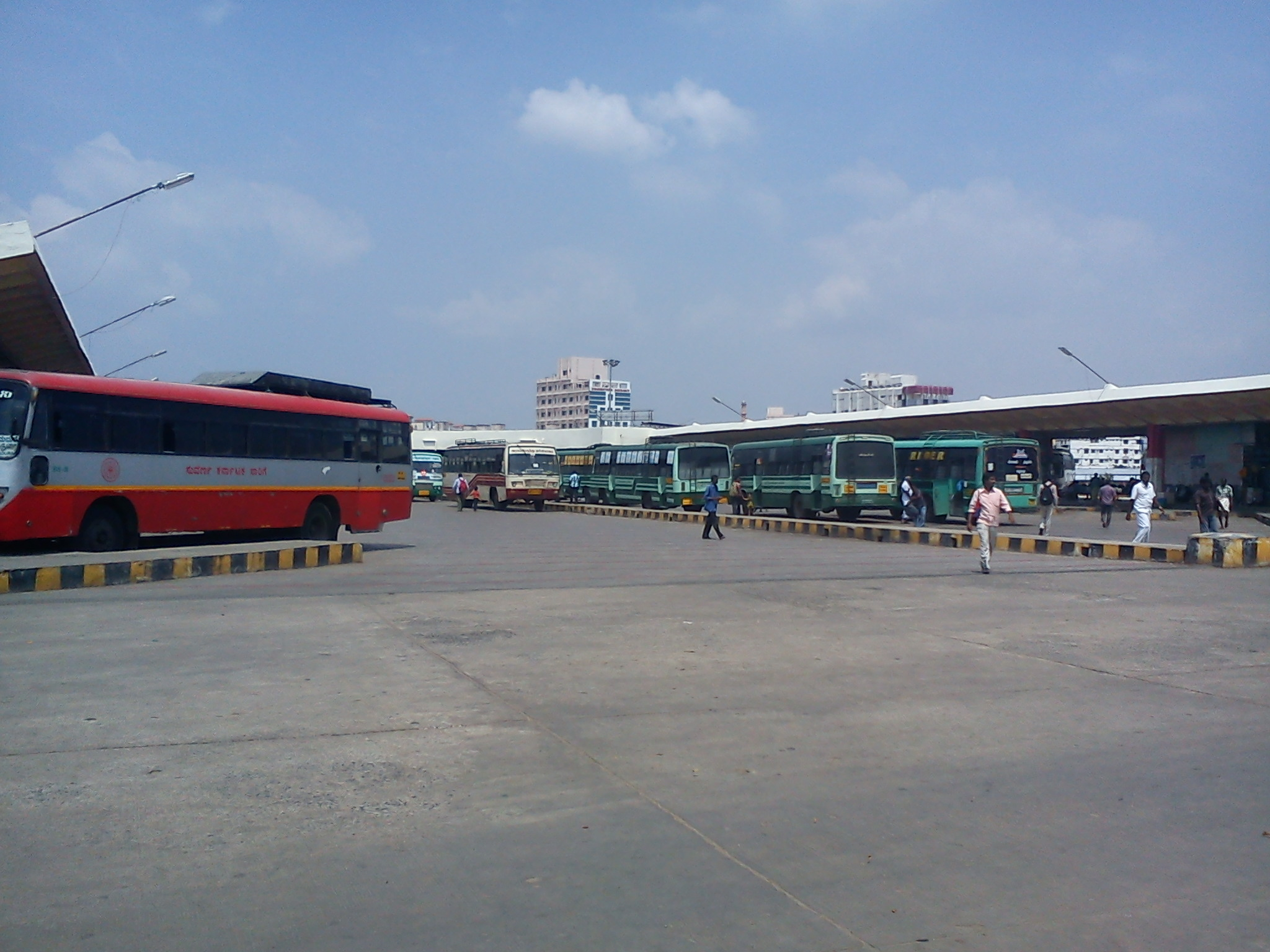
M.G.R Bus Stand 2nd & 3rd Platform

Platform	Bus Route
1	Chennai, Bengaluru, Mysuru, Tirupati, Kochi, Puducherry, Thiruvananthapuram and other interstate buses (SETC)
2	Tiruchirappalli, Cuddalore, Tiruvannamalai, Viluppuram, Ariyalur, Perambalur, Vellore, Neyveli TS, Natham
3	Sivagangai, Thanjavur, Kumbakonam, Mayiladuthurai, Nagapattinam, Vedaranyam, Tiruvarur, Chidambaram, Pudukottai, Karnataka state buses
4	Karaikudi, Devakottai, Aranthangi, Pattukottai, Ponnamaravathi, Melur
5	Ramanathapuram, Rameshwaram, Paramakudi, Kamuthi, Kilakarai, Kerala state buses
6	Rajapalayam, Tenkasi, Srivilliputhur, Sankarankoil, Sengottai, Papanasam, Kadayanallur
7	Thoothukudi, Tiruchendur, Aruppukkottai, Sivakasi, Sattur, Virudhunagar, Vilathikulam
8	Tirunelveli, Kanyakumari, Nagercoil, Kovilpatti, Nanguneri, Valliyur

==== Aarapalayam bus Terminus ====
This is another important bus stand in Madurai. Some of the city buses operating here are Coimbatore region and Salem region. The cities like Dindigul, Theni, Coimbatore, Tirupur, Erode, Ooty, Palani, Salem, Oddanchatram, Karur, Dharmapuri, Hosur, Kodaikanal and Pollachi.

In Arapalayam Bus Terminus there are 10 tracks are used to handle the mofussil buses

Future development: Due to its limited size, location within the city and increasing number

of bus services, Arapalayam Bus Terminus frequently experiences congestion.To address this issue, the city corporation has planned to establish a bus port near the proposed AIIMS facility.

The relocation of the bus terminus outside the city centre is intended to help reduce traffic

congestion in the surrounding areas.

Track	Bus Route
1	Periyakulam, Batlagundu, Kodaikanal
2	Theni, Bodinayakkanur, Usilampatti, Elumalai, Nilakottai via Sholavandan.
3	Cumbum, Kumily, Thevaram, Uthamapalayam, Thekkadi, Theni
4	Bit line ( Free Pass )
5	Erode, Sathyamangalam
6	Dindigul
7	Salem, Dharmapuri, Karur, Namakkal, krishnagiri, Hosur
8	Oddanchatram, Palani, Pollachi, Udumalaipettai, Coimbatore (Ukkadam)
9	Oddanchatram, Coimbatore, Mettupalayam, Ooty
10	Oddanchatram, Tirupur, Gobichettipalayam

== Rail ==
Madurai Junction railway station is one of the major railway junctions in south India and the headquarters of Madurai railway division. It is well connected with all major cities in India. Madurai division is the second largest by revenue in Southern Railway. It is one of the A1 graded stations in the Southern Railway (railway stations which earn of Rs. 50Cr p.a will get an A1 Grade). Madurai has two terminals:

- Madurai Junction Railway Station (Passenger Handling)
- Kudal Nagar Railway Station (Goods Handling)

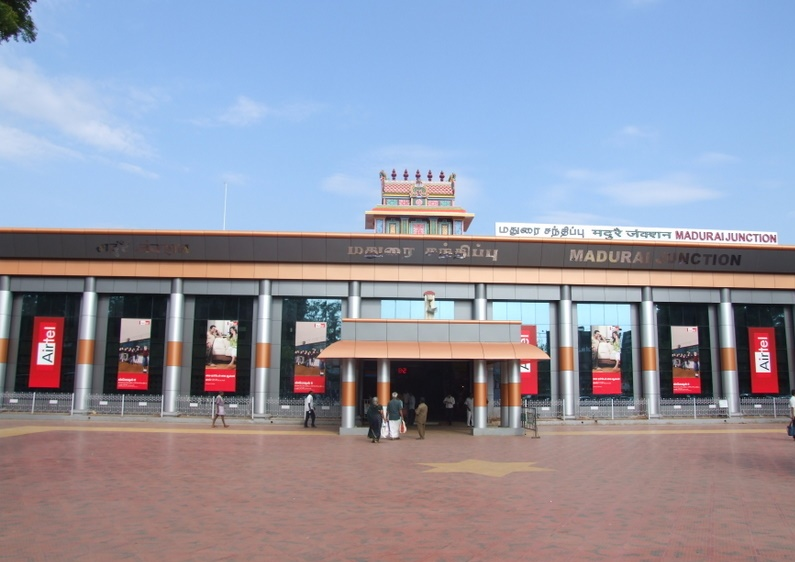
Madurai Junction, the main railway station of Madurai

Madurai Junction is an important railway junction in southern Tamil Nadu and constitutes a separate division of the Southern Railway. It is the second largest revenue division in Southern railway next to the Chennai division. There are direct trains from Madurai connecting important cities in India like Chennai, Mumbai, New Delhi, Jaipur, Bengaluru, Hyderabad, Trivandrum, Mysuru, Coimbatore, Kollam, Kanyakumari, Trichy, Tirunelveli, Rameswaram, Chandigarh, Ahmedabad, Vijayawada, Kolkata, Nagpur, and Bhopal. The state government announced a monorail project for Madurai in 2011 named as Madurai Monorail, which is in its planning stages.

=== Railway lines in Madurai Junction ===
Line No.	Towards	Passing through Station	Type / Track
1	Chennai Egmore	Dindigul Junction, Trichirappalli Junction	Broad, Electrified - Double Track
2	Kanyakumari	Virdhunagar Junction, Tirunelveli Junction	Broad, Electrified - Double Track
3	Rameswaram	Manamadurai Junction, Ramanathapuram	Broad, Electrified-Single Track
4	Bodinayakannur	Usilampatti, Theni	Broad, Electrified- Single Track
5	Thoothukudi	Arupukottai	Broad - Under Survey ( Proposed )
6	Karaikudi	Melur, Thirupathur	Broad - Under survey ( Proposed )

=== Suburban railway stations in Madurai ===
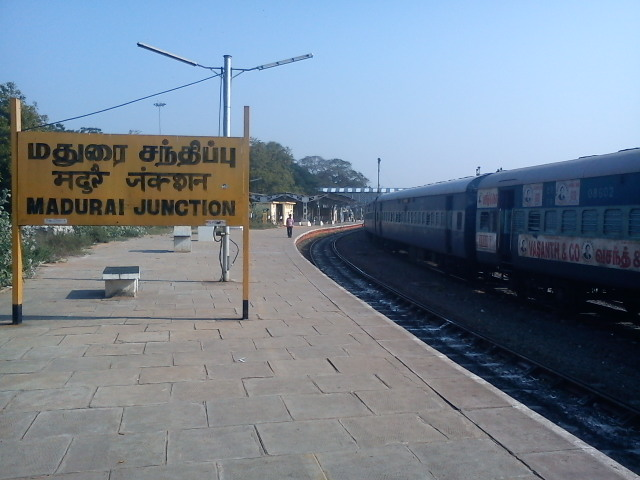
Madurai Junction Name Board

Sl No.	Station Name	Station Code
1	Kudalnagar	KON
2	Samayanallur	SER
3	Thirupparakundram	TDN
4	Thirumangalam	TMQ
5	Madurai East	MES
6	Silaimaan	ILA
7	Vadapalanji	VAJ
8	Keelakyuilkudi	KKY
9	Sholavandhan	SDN

== Air ==
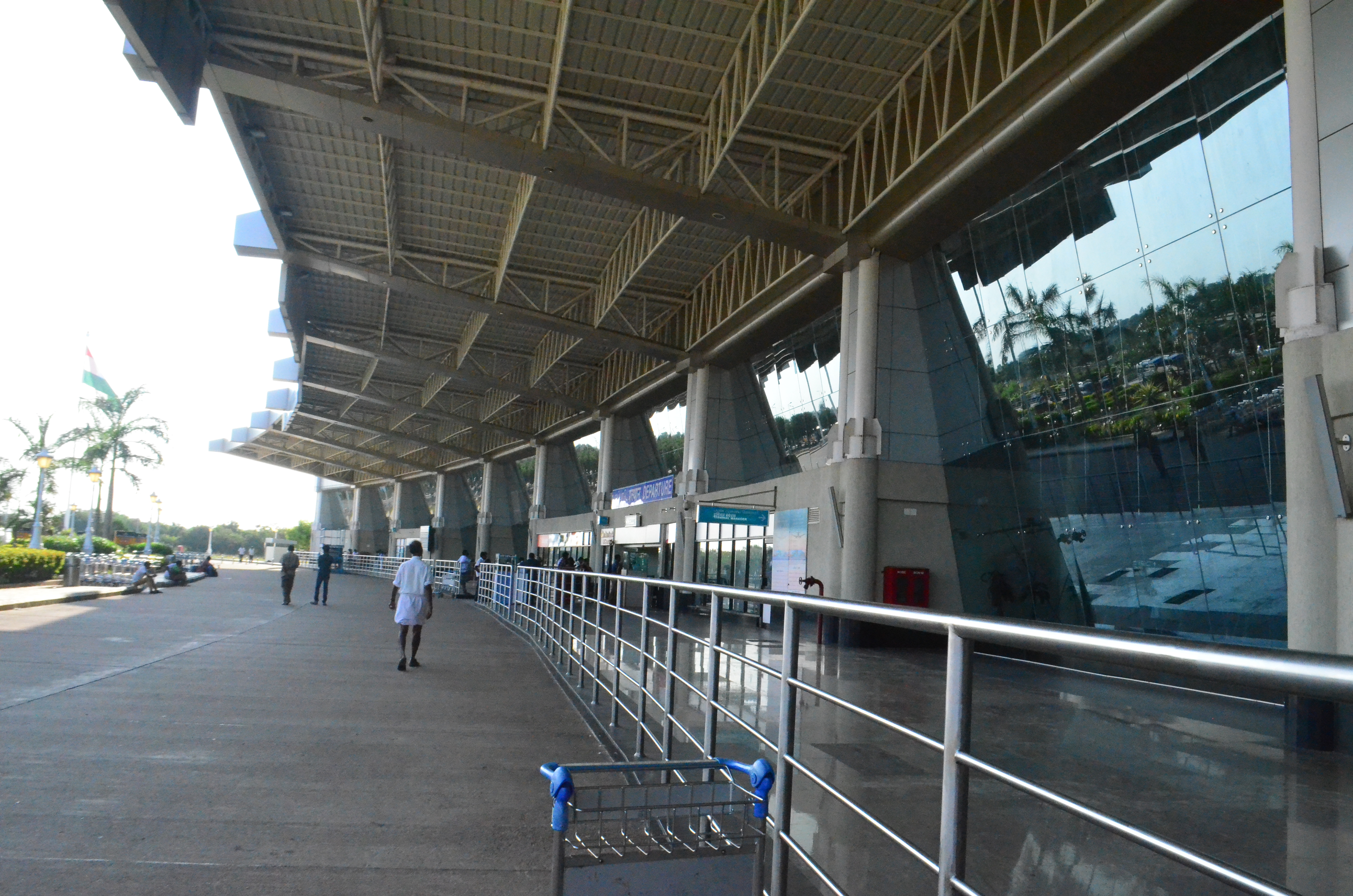
A view of the Madurai International Airport

Madurai International Airport (IATA: IXM, ICAO: VOMD) is an international airport serving Madurai in the state of Tamil Nadu. The airport is located about 12 km (7.5 mi) from the Madurai railway station. The airport was established in 1956 and is one of the most important airports in Tamil Nadu. It offers domestic flight services to major cities in India and international flights to Colombo, Sri Lanka began on 20 September 2012. Now, it also offers services to Dubai and Singapore. Air India Express, IndiGo, Air India and SpiceJet operate from the airport. The airport handled 520,000 passengers between April 2011 and March 2012.

=== Terminals ===
The airport has two adjacent terminals. Currently the integrated terminal is being used for both international and domestic purposes. The Airports Authority of India is planning to convert the old terminal into a cargo complex.

==== Passenger terminal ====
As the part of modernising 35 non-metropolitan airports, AAI constructed a state-of-art new integrated passenger terminal adjacent to the old terminal. The ₹1.29 billion (US$13 million) new integrated passenger terminal building was inaugurated on 12 September 2010. A total of 610 acres (250 ha) of land is under acquisition for the expansion of the runway to 12,500 ft (3,800 m) to accommodate large jet aircraft. This terminal with an area of 17,560 m^{2} (189,000 sq ft) can handle a passenger capacity of 250 each on arrival and departure. The airport parking area has the capacity to park 375 cars and 10 buses. Some of the features of the new terminal include:

- 16 Check-in counters
- 12 Immigration counters
- 1 Security counter
- 5 customs counters
- 3 Conveyor belts (47 m (154 ft) each)
- 2 X-ray scanners for baggage
- 105 CISF strength
- Total aircraft stands = 7
  - 1 B767-400
  - 1 A310-300
  - 3 B737-800W/A320-200
  - 2 ATR 72–500.

The new terminal has two lounges, a VIP lounge managed by AAI and the Commercial Important persons (CIP) lounge managed by TNCC-Madurai.

==== Cargo terminal ====
Considering the growing cargo potential in Madurai International Airport, AAI has decided to modify the old terminal into a full-fledged cargo complex. To start with, the union finance ministry has issued customs notifications dated 28 May 2013 regarding the handling of cargo at the Madurai International Airport.

==== Airlines and destinations ====
Airlines	Destinations
Air India	Chennai, Mumbai
Air India Express	Singapore
Alliance Air	Chennai
IndiGo	Bengaluru, Chennai, Hyderabad, Delhi, Mumbai
SpiceJet	Chennai, Delhi, Dubai-International, Mumbai
SriLankan Airlines	Colombo–Bandaranaike

== See also ==
- Madurai Monorail
- Madurai International Airport
- Madurai Junction
- Transport in Chennai
- Transport in India
- Mattuthavani
