= Big Mosque, Poonamallee =

Mosque in Chennai, Tamil Nadu, India

Big Mosque
- பூந்தமல்லி பெரிய பள்ளிவாசல்
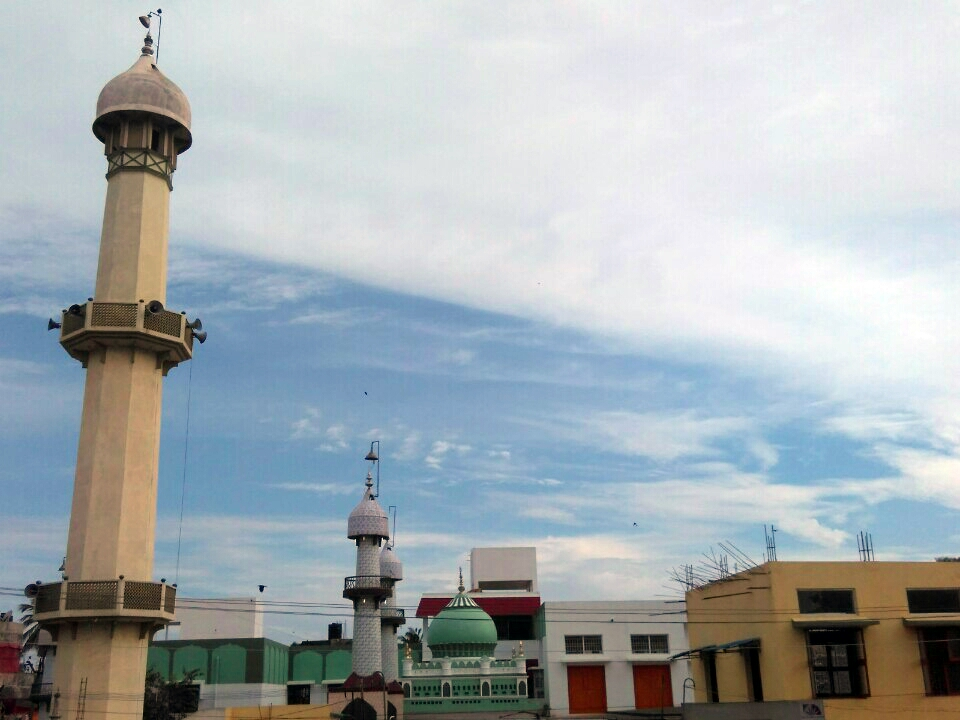

- Location of the mosque in Chennai

Religion
- Affiliation: Sunni Islam
- Sect: Barelvi movement
- Ecclesiastical or organizational status: Mosque
- Status: Active

Location
- Location: Chennai, Tamil Nadu
- Country: India
- Interactive map of Big Mosque
- Coordinates: 13°03′13″N 80°16′27″E

Architecture
- Type: Mosque architecture
- Style: Indo-Saracenic
- Founder: Astirabad Dhulfiqar
- Completed: 1653 CE

The Big Mosque (Tamil: பூந்தமல்லி பெரிய பள்ளிவாசல்) is a Sunni mosque, located in Poonamallee, a suburb of Chennai, in the state of Tamil Nadu, India. The mosque was constructed in 1653 during the rule of the Golconda Sultanate by Rustam, son of a Golconda courtier named Astirabad Dhulfiqar. It was the first in Tamil Nadu to be built in the Indo-Saracenic Revival style.

The mosque follows the principles of Ahle Sunnath-Wal-Jama'th.

== See also ==
- Islam in India
- List of mosques in India
