= Nilaiyur =

- sub urban
- Nickname: Kaithari nagar
- Location in Tamil Nadu, India Nilaiyur (India)
- Coordinates: 9.51°0′0″N 78.3°0′0″E
- Country: India
- State: Tamil Nadu
- District: Madurai

Population (2001)
  - Total: 12,438

Languages
  - Official: Tamil
- Time zone: UTC+5:30 (IST)
- PIN: 625005
- Vehicle registration: TN-58,59,64
- Coastline: 0 kilometres (0 mi)
- Nearest city: Madurai
- Sex ratio: 1006 ♂/♀
- Literacy: 65.76%
- Lok Sabha constituency: Virudhunagar
- Vidhan Sabha constituency: Thirumangalam
- Avg. summer temperature: 36 °C (97 °F)
- Avg. winter temperature: 22.8 °C (73.0 °F)

Nilaiyur is a suburb in Madurai district in Tamil Nadu, South India. It is located between the cities of Madurai and Thirumangalam (Exactly 17 km from Madurai and 15 km from Thirumangalam).

== Geography and climate ==
Nilaiyur has an average elevation of 5 m (16 ft). The Boundary lies the village of sambakulam(East), Karuvelampatti (South), Koothiyar kundu (West) and Thirupparankundram (North).

The maximum temperature is approximately 36°C during April - May months and the minimum temperature is approximately 22.8 °C during December - January months.

== Division and population ==
The population of Nilaiyur is 12438 including Males - 6201 and females - 6237. The sex ratio is 1006 females per 1000 males. The Literacy Rate is 65.76% The population of the kaitharinagar is 6444 including Males - 3184 and females - 3260. This is during the year 2011.

== Occupation and culture ==
The main occupation of the people is Agriculture. Paddy, pulses, groundnut, and sugarcane are the main field crops and coconut and banana are the important tree crops. The Nilaiyur Reservoir is the main water source.

In Kaithari nagar, the main occupation is weaving in Hand-loom sarees & power loom sarees, so the village name is called kaithari nagar.

The people following sourastra culture (Gujarat) and they following Gujarat culture like marriage function and Dhasal(puratasi) Etc.

Kaitharai Nagar in Nilayur panchayat got its name when handloom workers got houses through co-operative societies in the early 1980's.

Kaithari nagar people speak main language of Sourastra which the language origin from Gujarat, and Tamil is secondary language.
