= Neelambur =

Suburb of Coimbatore, Tamil Nadu, India

- Suburb
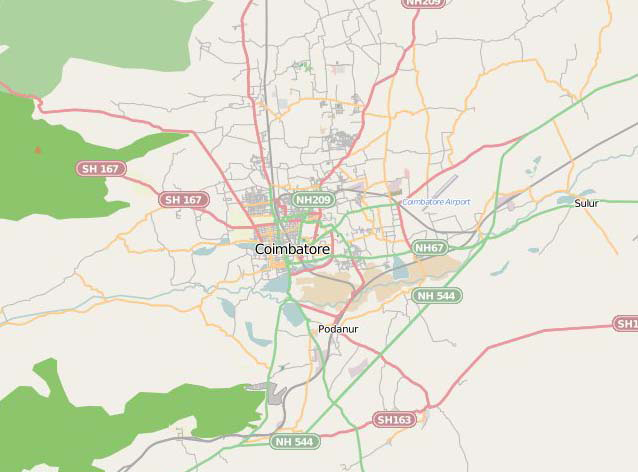
- Location in Tamil Nadu, India Neelambur (Tamil Nadu) Neelambur (India)
- Coordinates: 11°4′13″N 77°5′6.7″E
- Country: India
- State: Tamil Nadu
- Region: Kongu Nadu
- District: Coimbatore

Government
  - Type: Panchayat
  - Body: Neelambur Panchayat

Area
  - Total: 9 km^{2} (3.5 sq mi)

Population (2011)
  - Total: 8,382
  - Density: 930/km^{2} (2,400/sq mi)

Languages
  - Official: Tamil
- Time zone: UTC+5:30 (IST)
- PIN: 641062
- Vehicle registration: TN 37

Neelambur is a suburb in Coimbatore District, Tamil Nadu. Neelambur is situated in the Eastern Part of Coimbatore. Neelambur is the entrance of Coimbatore City from the National Highways. The road splits for Palakkad, Kerala and Coimbatore City here. Neelambur is also the East-End of Coimbatore City. Neelambur lies on the Junction of Avinashi Road, NH 47 and NH 544. Neelambur has few Major Hospitals, Colleges, 5-Star Hotels.

== Educational Institutions ==
=== Colleges ===
- PSG Institute of Technology and Applied Research (PSG iTech)
- Kathir College of Arts and Science
- Kathir College of Engineering

=== Schools ===
- GRD-CPF Matriculation Hr.Sec.School
- Govt Middle School, Neelambur
- Sri Chaitanya School
- Kathir Vidhya Mandhir
- Ramakrishna Vidhyalayam School

== Hospitals ==
- Royal Care Super Speciality Hospital
- PSG Rural Medical Centre

== Theatres and Theme Park ==
- Maharaja Multiplex
- Maharaja Theme Park
