= Mattuthavani =

- Suburb
- Location in Tamil Nadu, India
- Coordinates: 9.9450°N 78.1557°E
- Country: India
- State: Tamil Nadu
- District: Madurai

Government
  - Type: Municipal Corporation
  - Body: Madurai City Municipal Corporation

Languages
  - Official: Tamil
- Time zone: UTC+5:30 (IST)
- PIN: 625007
- Telephone code: 91-452
- Vehicle registration: TN 59

Mattuthavani is a neighborhood on the outskirts of Madurai city in the Indian state of Tamil Nadu.

== Central vegetable and flower market ==
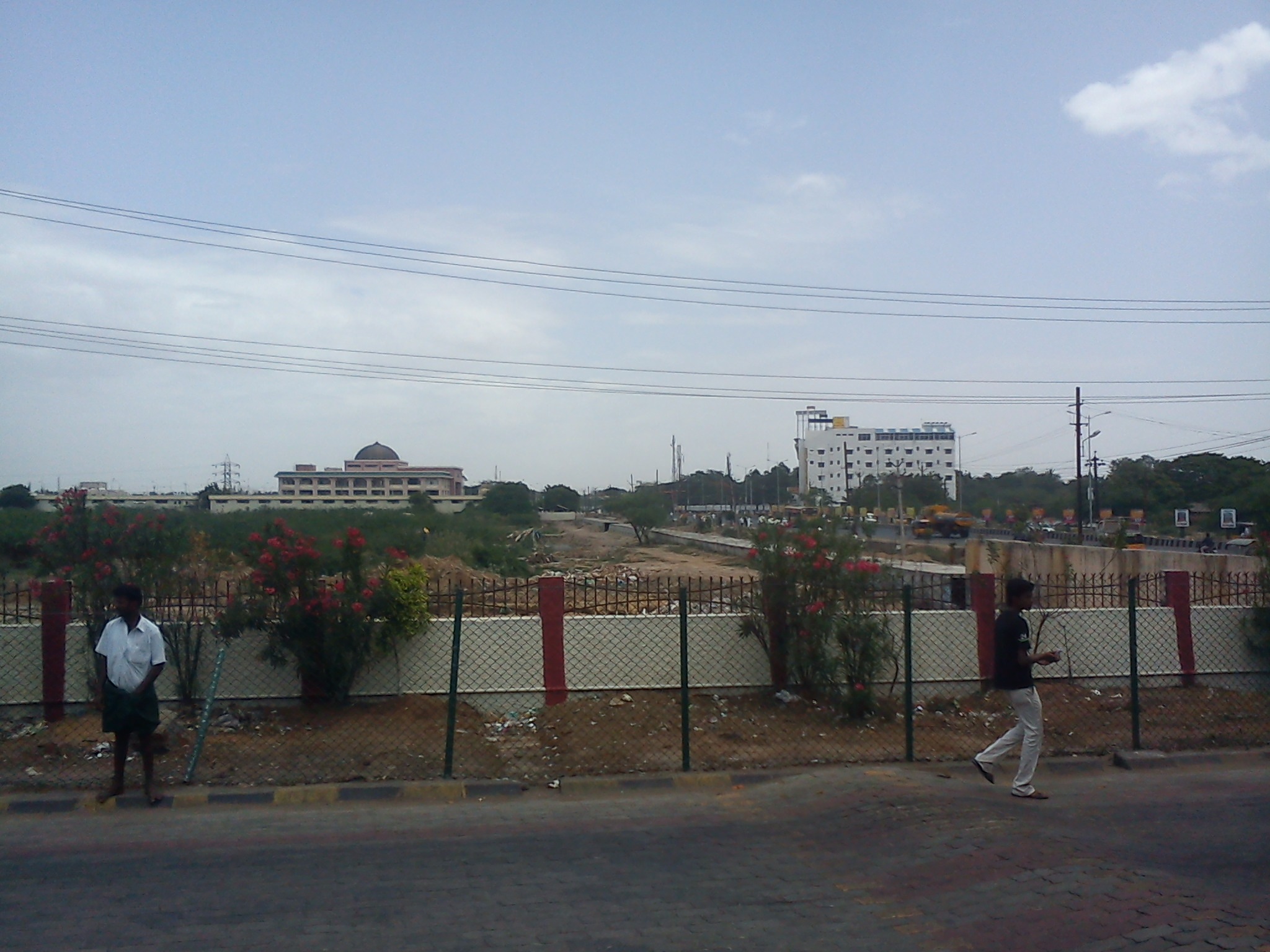
Flower Market

Before being shifted to Mattuthavani, the Madurai district central vegetable market operated on North Chittirai street. This caused heavy traffic congestion on city roads because of the heavy flow of trucks and goods carriers. The market moved to vacant land between the bus stand and the agricultural marketing complex at Mattuthavani at a cost of ₹63 crore. The Integrated Central Vegetable Market at Mattuthavani opened at this new location from 1 September 2010. The complex was constructed at a cost of ₹13 crore. The flower market is situated in between the Central market and the Bus stand.

== Gallery ==
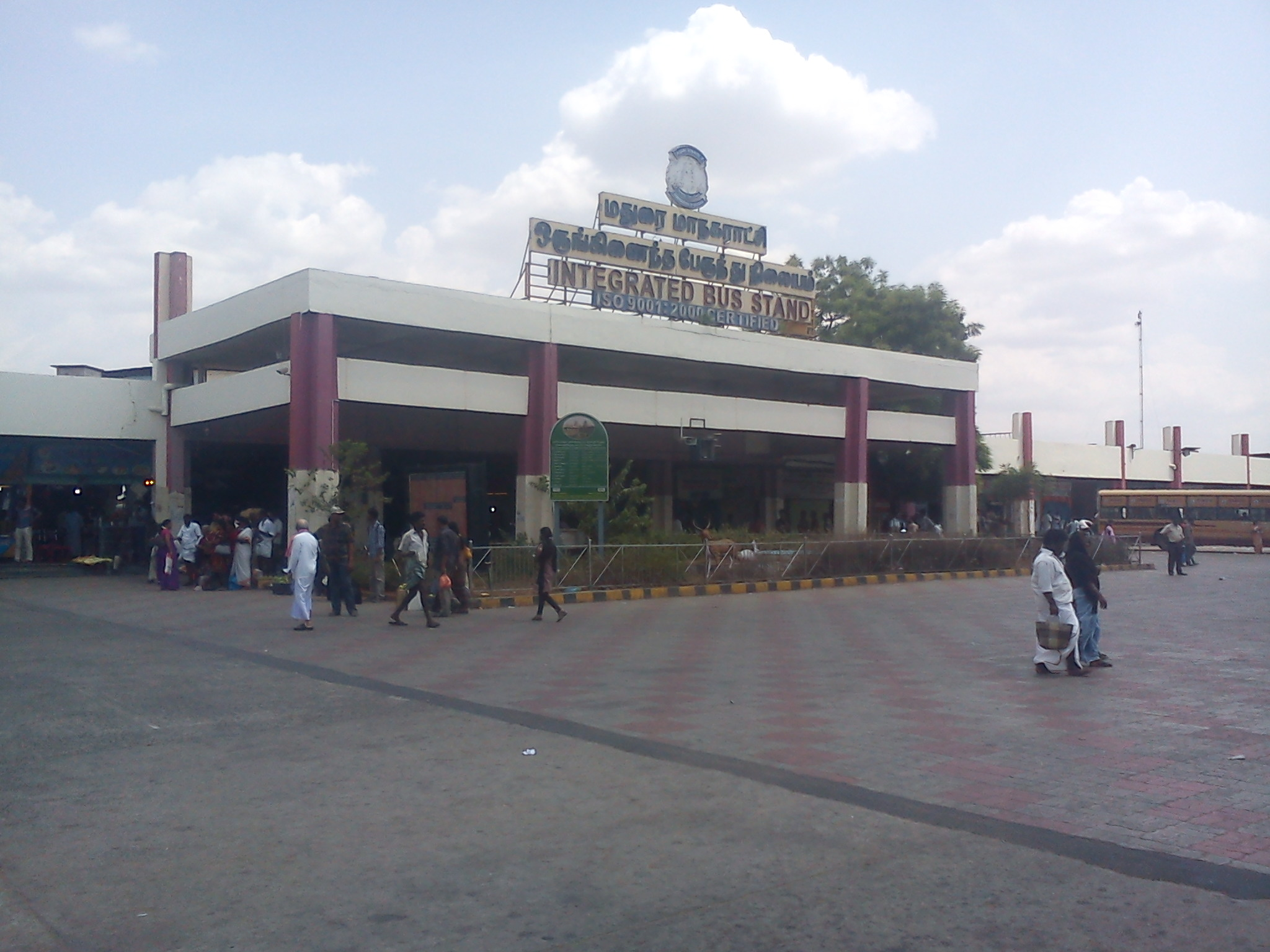
Mattuthavani Bus Terminus

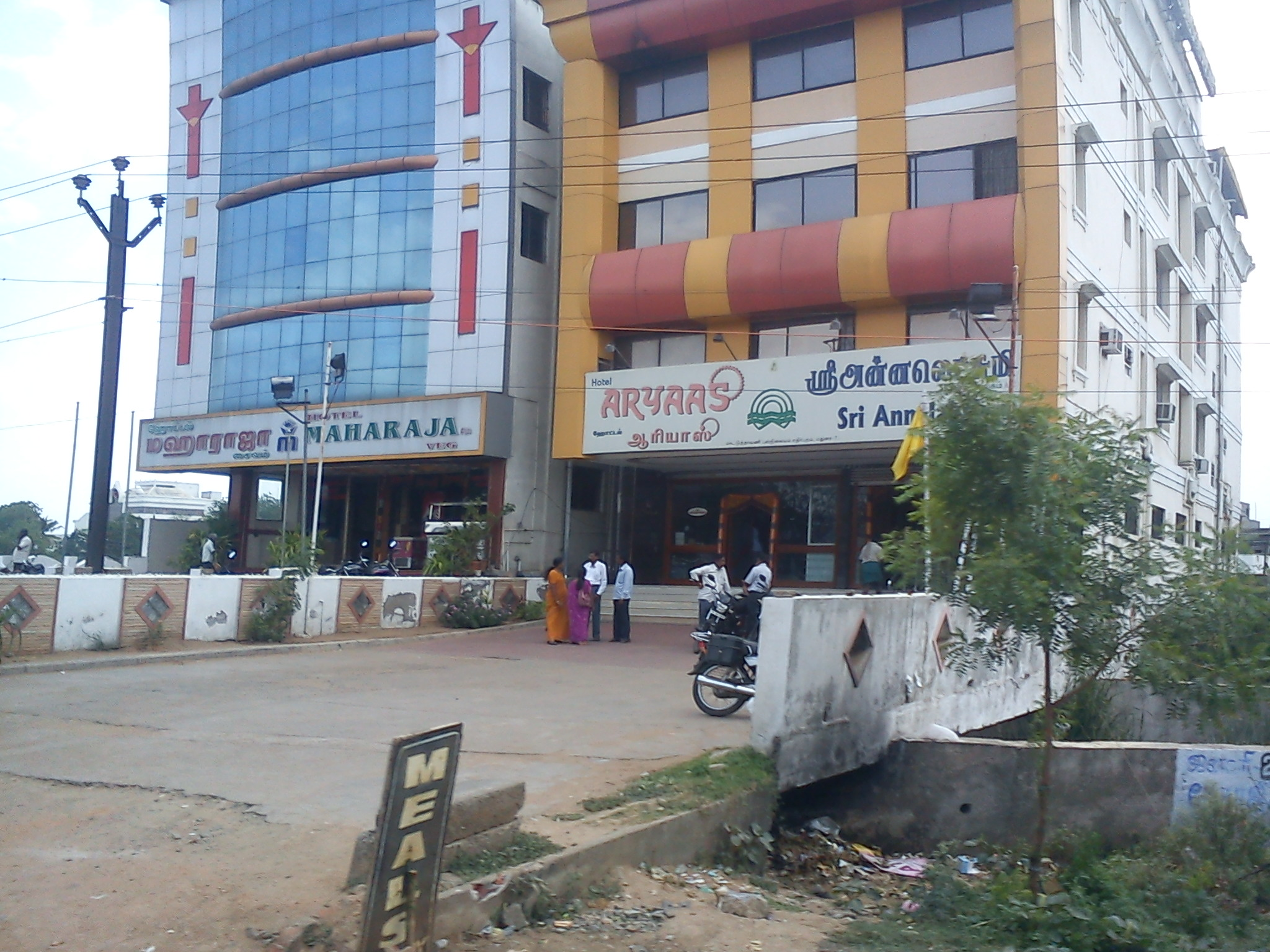
Hotels Near Mattuthavani

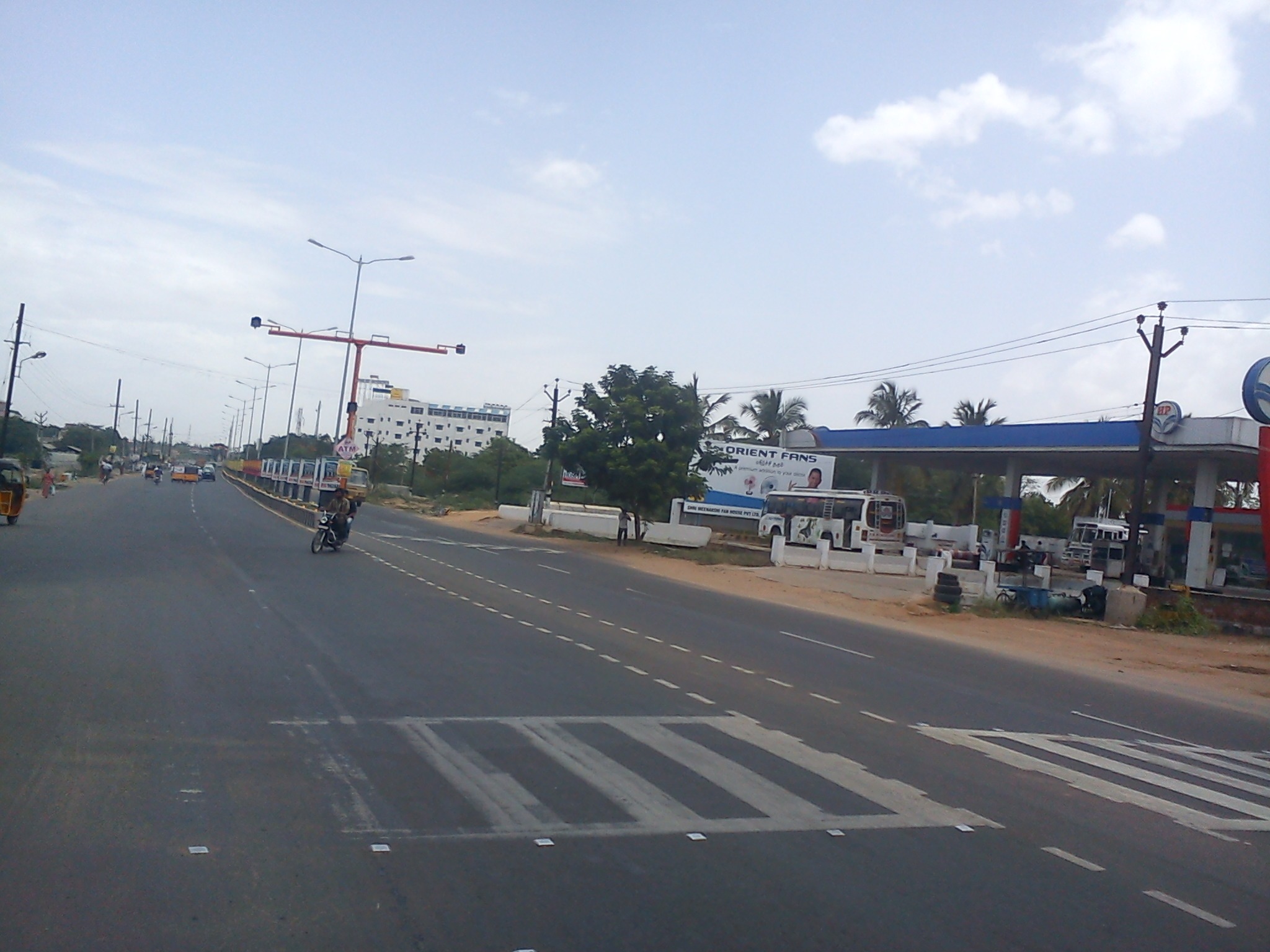
Mattuthavani High Road

== See also ==
- Madurai
