= Sathy Road =

Arterial road in Coimbatore, India

- Maintained by: Highways and Minor Ports Department; Coimbatore City Municipal Corporation
- Length: 7 km (4.3 mi)
- South end: Gandhipuram, Coimbatore
- North end: Saravanampatti, Coimbatore

Sathy Road, (NH 209) is a congested arterial road in city of Coimbatore, Tamil Nadu, India. It is a part of National Highway 209 [National Highway 948] between Coimbatore and Bengaluru. This road runs for about 7 kilometers starting exactly from the GP Signal, Gandhipuram up to the northern suburb of Saravanampatti. It is ten metres (33 ft) wide in most stretches.

It was originally known as Sathyamangalam Road. The road starts at Cross cut Road intersection where it meets with Bharathiyar Road and Dr.Nanjappa road in Gandhipuram, Coimbatore, Tamilnadu.

It is a part of the National highway 948 (Previously referred as National Highway 209) which is one of the routes that connect Tamilnadu with Karnataka. Reference Ministry of Road Transport and Highways, India. It is certainly longer than 7 Km(s)Sathyamangalam given that the road network is expanding.

== Places transversed ==
- GP Signal, Gandhipuram
- Coimbatore Omni Bus Terminus
- Ganapathy
- Athipalayam Pirivu
- Sivananthapuram
- Saravanampatti Pirivu
- Saravanampatti
