= Oppanakara Street =

Oppanakara Street at Coimbatore
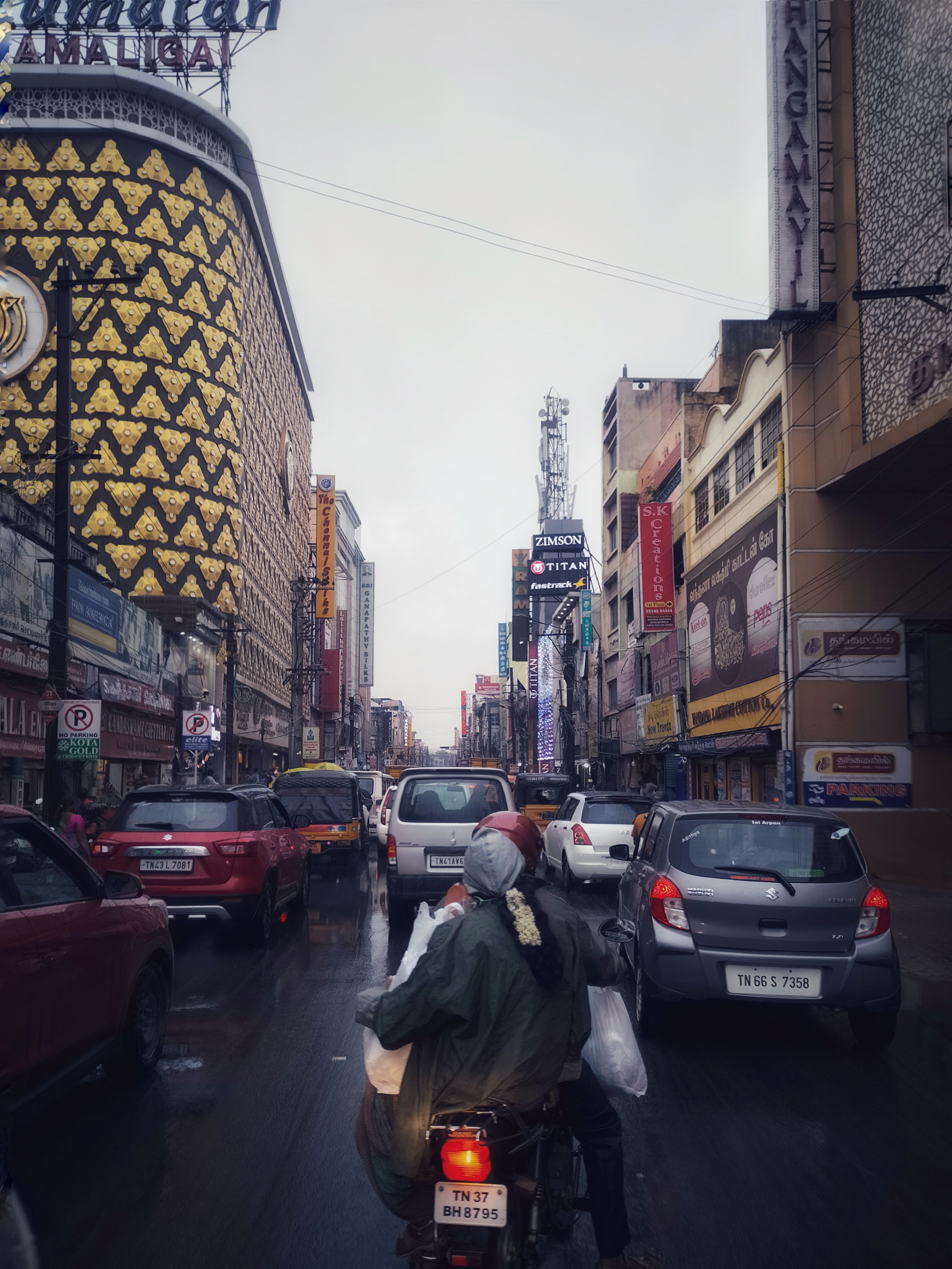
- Oppanakara Street in November 2022
- Maintained by: Coimbatore City Municipal Corporation
- From end: South Ukkadam, Coimbatore
- Major junctions: Vysial street Raja Street; Thomas Street; Big Bazaar Street; Edayar Street/Varity Hall Road
- To end: Mill Road junction, Coimbatore

Oppanakara Street is a major commercial street in Coimbatore, India. It is located close to the Town Hall area and the Coimbatore Corporation building. Known for its dense concentration of textile and jewellery showrooms, the street is regarded as the busiest shopping district in the city and one of the most prominent retail stretches in Tamil Nadu.

== General ==
The street extends between South Ukkadam and Mill Road, intersecting with several historic trade lanes such as Raja Street and Big Bazaar Street. Commercial activity ranges from street vendors selling household items to large format showrooms dealing in silk sarees, textiles, and gold jewellery. Coimbatore is often described as the textile hub of India, and Oppanakara Street serves as the city's traditional focal point for fabric and garment retailing.

Often compared to T. Nagar in Chennai and Commercial Street in Bangalore, Oppanakara Street is Coimbatore's answer to high-density, high-volume retail corridors, renowned for its mix of affordability, variety, and tradition. The street experiences particularly heavy pedestrian activity during festival seasons such as Diwali, Pongal, and Ramzan, when textile and jewellery purchases peak. Reports note that lakhs of people visit Oppanakara Street and nearby Big Bazaar Street during weekends ahead of Diwali. To support this surge in visitors, authorities introduce seasonal arrangements such as extended shopping hours, festive lighting, and smart camera systems to monitor the flow of people.

== Infrastructure ==
Oppanakara Street is easily accessible via multiple modes of transport. It is located within walking distance of Coimbatore Railway Junction and Ukkadam Bus Terminus, with several multilevel retail buildings equipped with escalators, CCTV surveillance, and ample parking for two-wheelers and cars.

== Commercial shops ==
Oppanakara Street is anchored by several of Coimbatore's largest textile and jewellery retailers. Notable stores include Pothys, The Chennai Silks, SPP Silks, Saravana Selvarathnam Stores, and major jewellery chains such as Thangamayil, Kumaran Thangamaligai, Joy Alukkas, and Malabar Gold and Diamonds. Alongside these flagship outlets, numerous mid-sized textile shops and long-established local traders also operate on the street.

Other commercial shops on Oppanakara Street include:

1. Pothys
2. The Chennai Silks (2 showrooms)
3. SPP Silks
4. Uday Textiles
5. Ramraj Cotton
6. Ganapathy Silks
7. Saravana Selvarathnam Stores
8. Thangamayil Jewellery
9. Kumaran Thangamaligai (2 showrooms)
10. Joy Alukkas Jewellery
11. Malabar Gold and Diamonds
