= Avinashi Road, Coimbatore =

Road in Coimbatore, India

Avinashi Road
- Avinashi Saalai
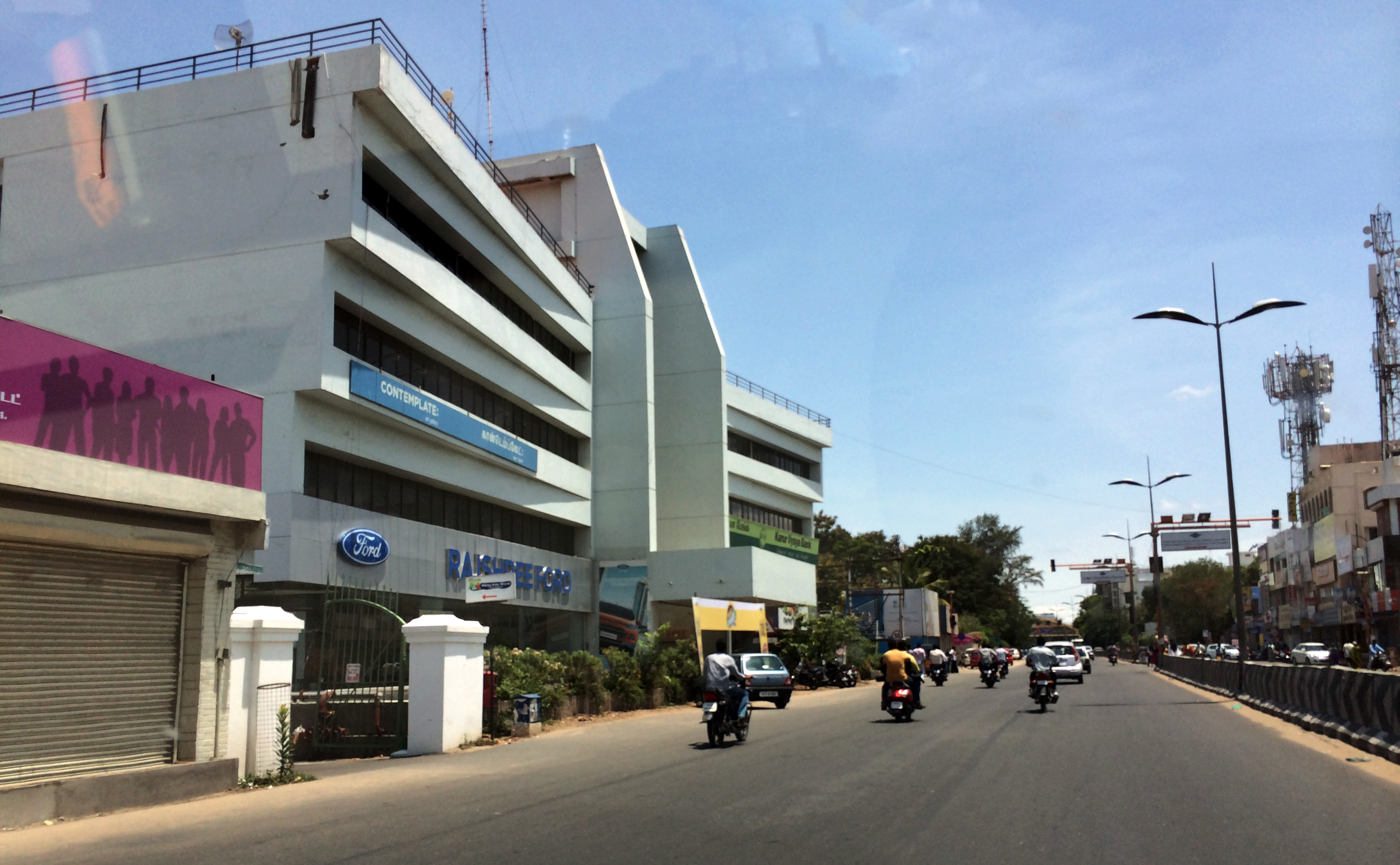
- The Uffizi, Aninashi Road, Peelamedu Coimbatore
- Interactive map of Avinashi Road
- Maintained by: Highways and Minor Ports Department; Coimbatore City Municipal Corporation
- Coordinates: 11°01′38″N 77°01′23″E
- East end: Neelambur NH 544 / Coimbatore bypass/ Salem bypass Junction at Neelambur, Coimbatore
- Major junctions: Dr. Nanjappa Road/Old Post office Road; Headquarters Road/Addis street (Grey Town); LIC Road; Dr. Balasundaram Road/Huzur Road; Netaji road (GKNM Hospital); Circuit House Road; PN Palayam Road/Puliyakulam Road (Laxhmi Mills); Nava India Road/Sowripalayam Road; Bharathi Colony Main Road; Pioneer Mills Road; GV Residency Road (Fun Mall); Anna Nagar main Road; Villankuruchi Road/Masakalipalayam Road; Kamaraj Road/Tidel Park road (Hopes bridge); CODISSIA Road; Airport Road/Kalapatti Road; Sulur road (Chinniampalayam).
- West end: Uppilipalayam Flyover, Roundabout, Coimbatore

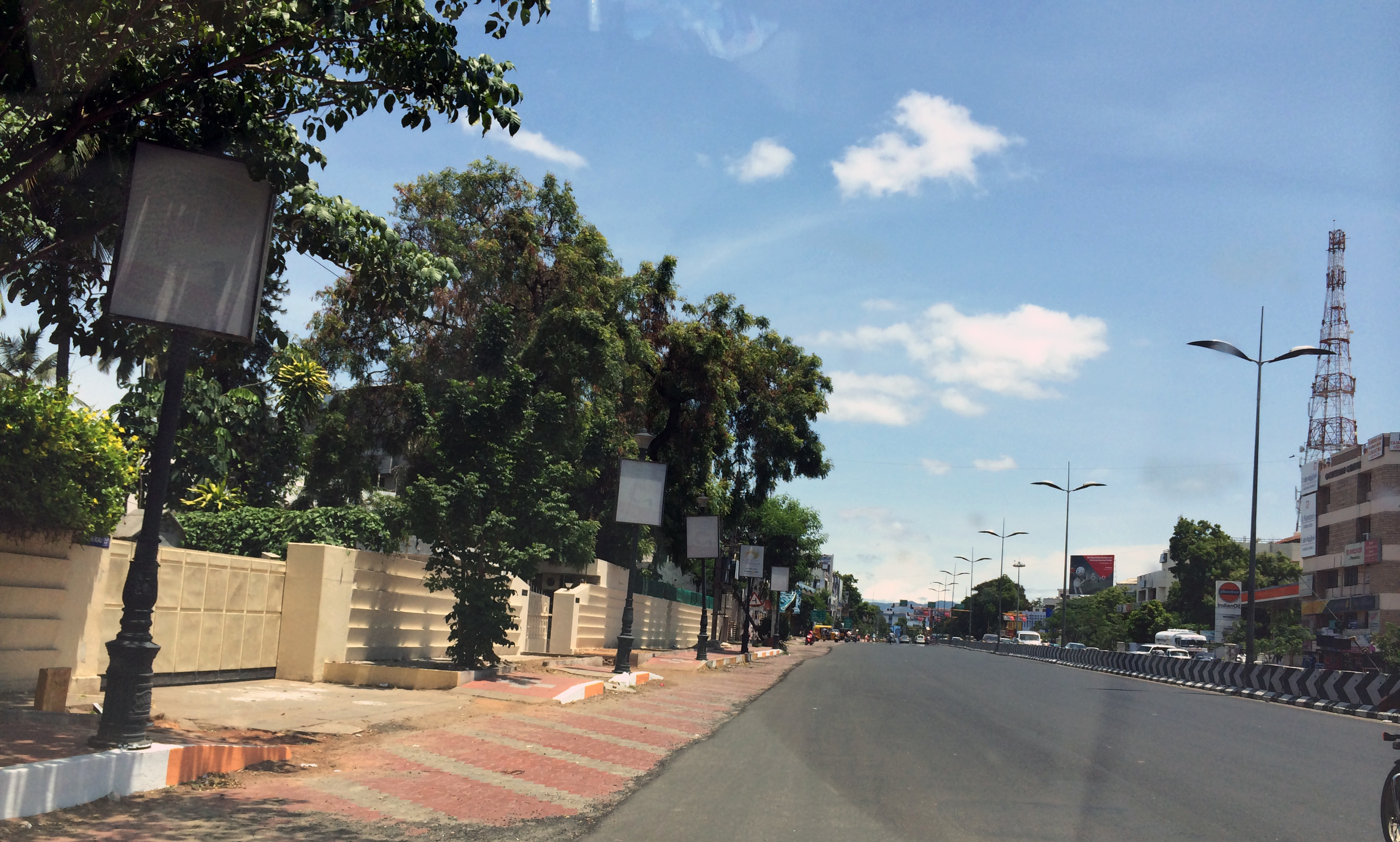
Avinashi Road in Papanaickenpalayam(Old Photo)

Avinashi Road, is an arterial road in Coimbatore, India. Running from west to east, the road starts at Uppilipalayam flyover and ends at Neelambur by-pass junction where it joins NH 544, Beyond Neelambur Junction, the road branches into two, with one traversing southwards to Madukarai to form the Coimbatore bypass while the other continues westwards to Avinashi and beyond to form the National Highway 544. This road connects Coimbatore to its airport and the east and north-east suburbs. The road was an indicator of development as the city of Coimbatore grew up mostly along its eastern and western sides.

== Description ==
Avinashi Road is of the main gateway into the city by road as well as from North and Eastern parts of India. This road is also home for Educational Institutions, Major speciality hospitals, Corporate offices, Information technology parks, Shopping malls and Luxury hotels. Today, this road has turned out to be the most important arterial road in the city. This road is gateway to vehicles coming from East and North-East Tamil Nadu and bound for Tirupur, Erode, Salem, Vellore, Chennai, Bangalore. The road once part of National highways 544 (Salem - Cochin Highway) is now maintained by the Tamil Nadu Highways Department. In recent years the road was widened into a six-lane. This 16-km stretch of road running diagonally across the city in East West orientation slightly moving North East tangent.a Avinashi road starts from Uppilipalayam flyover near Grey Town area, it passes through the important neighbourhoods of Peelamedu and Chinniampalayam and finally Neelambur.

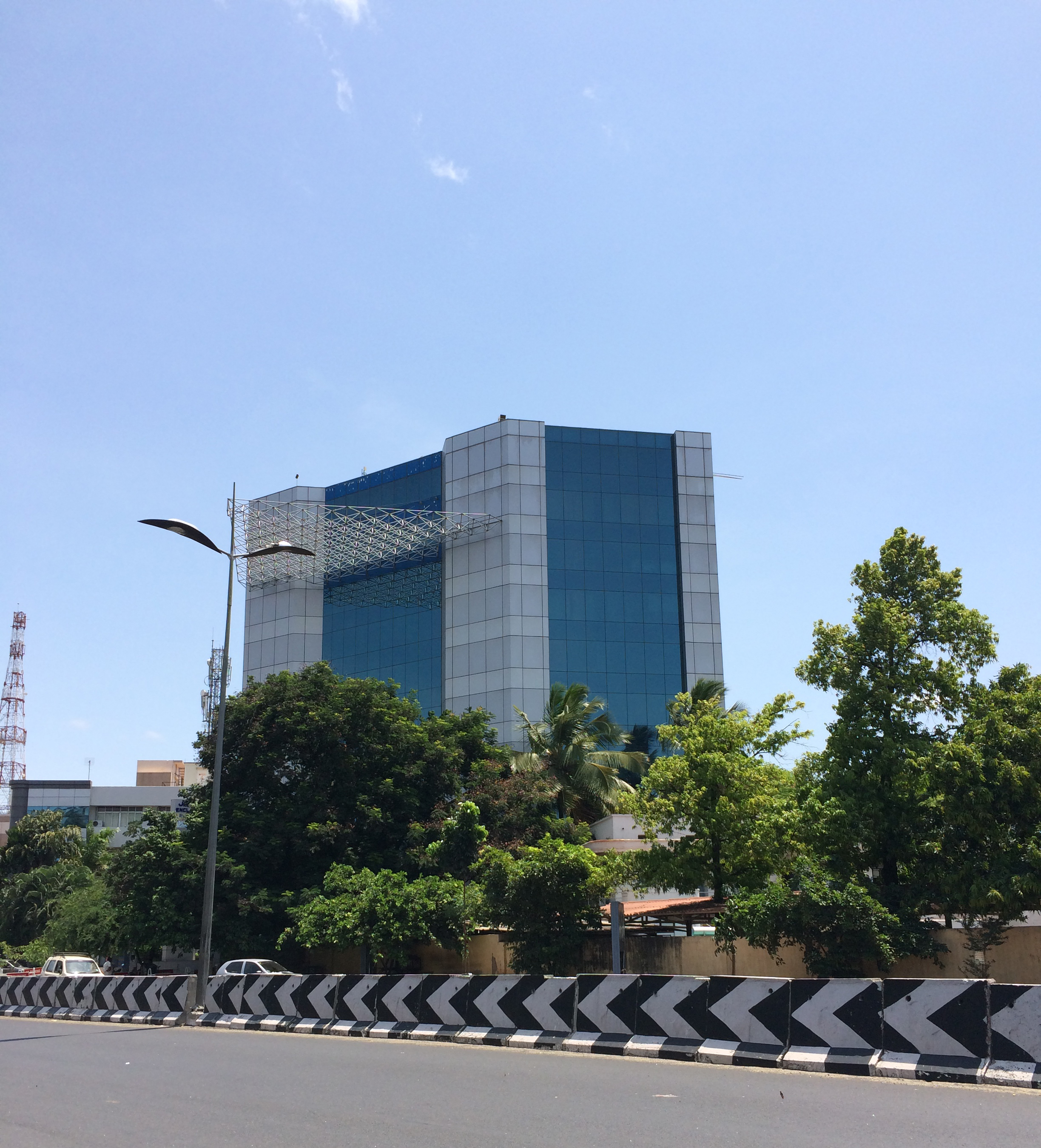
An office building in Avinashi Road, Coimbatore

== Places transversed ==
- Anna Silai junction
- Chinniampalayam
- Civil Aerodrome
- Goldwins
- Thottipalayam Pirivu
- Hope College
- Lakshmi Mills junction
- Mylampatty
- Nava India
- Neelambur
- Papanaickenpalayam
- Peelamedu
- SITRA (Airport signal)
- Uppilipalayam Flyover
- VOC Park & LIC junction

== Landmarks on Avinashi Road ==
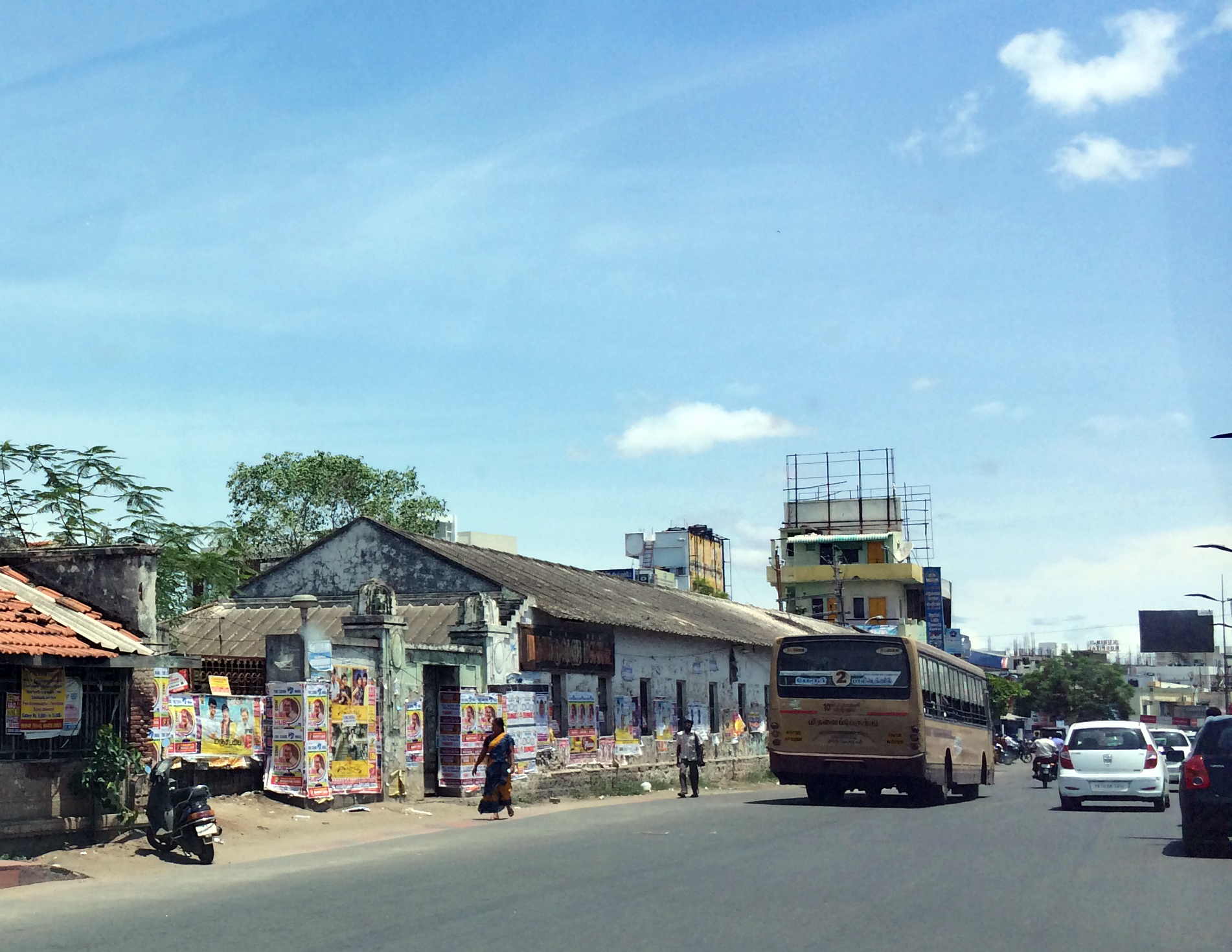
The now defunct Radhakrishna Mills gate, once a major employer in Peelamedu, Coimbatore

=== Major Hotels ===
- The Residency Towers Coimbatore
- The Orbis Hotels
- Radisson Blu
- Le Méridien
- Fairfield by Marriott
- Ibis Coimbatore City Centre
- Jenney's Residency
- Grand Regent
- Satyam Grand
- Park Plaza
- GRT Grand
- The Arcadia

== Railway Stations ==
- Peelamedu Railway station

== Airport ==
- Coimbatore International Airport, Peelamedu, Coimbatore

== Major Landmarks ==
=== Art Gallery & Museums ===
- G. D. Naidu Industrial Exhibition
- Gedee Car Museum
- Kasthuri Srinivasan Art Gallery

=== Parks & Recreation ===
  - VOC Park Grounds
  - Coimbatore Zoo

=== Research Institutes ===
- The South India Textile Research Association a.k.a. SITRA
- Sardar Vallabhbhai Patel International School of Textiles and Management
- UMS Technologies Training Centre

=== Educational Institutions ===
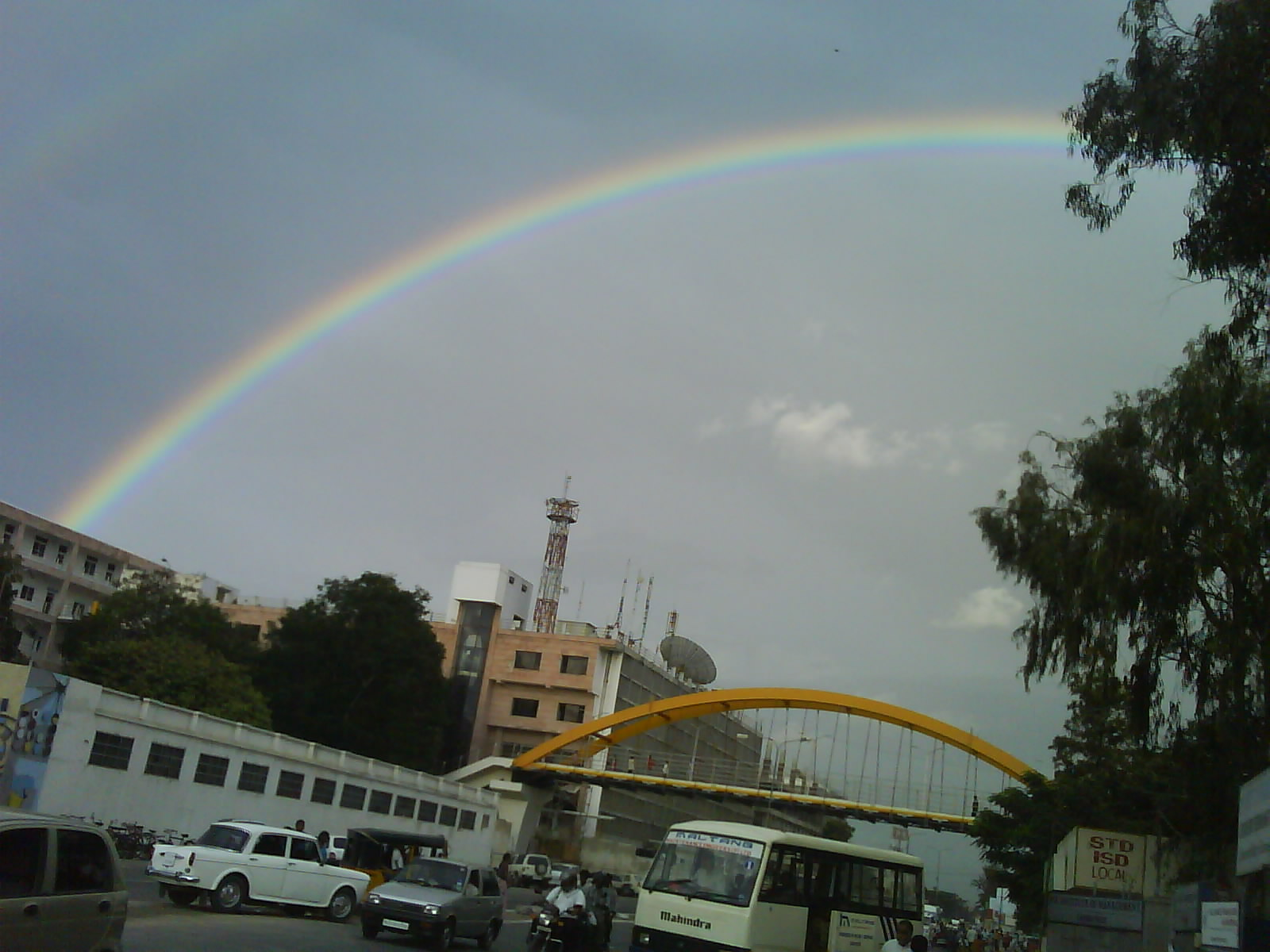
Rainbow complements PSG bridge

- Stanes Anglo Indian Higher Secondary School
- GRG Matriculation Higher Secondary School
- National Model Schools
- PSG College of Technology
- PSG College of Arts and Science
- PSG Institute of Management Coimbatore
- PSG Institute of Medical Sciences & Research
- Coimbatore Medical College
- Government Polytechnic College
- SNR College of Arts and science
- Sri Ramakrishna dental college and hospital
- Coimbatore Institute of Technology
- Dr G R Damodaran College of Science

=== IT-Parks ===
- TIDEL Park Coimbatore
- Hanudev InfoPark
- ELCOT IT Park [Under Construction]
- ELCOT SEZ, Coimbatore

=== MNC Companies ===
- Accenture
- Bosch
- Capgemini
- IBM
- Infosys
- State Street HCL Services
- SLB
- Tata Consultancy Services
- Tech Mahindra
- UST Global
- Wipro

=== Other Notable Landmark ===
- Anna Statue
- Passport Seva Kendra
- PSG Tech skywalk

=== Shopping ===
- Fun Republic Mall

=== Cinemas ===
- Cinépolis- 5 Screens

=== Textile Mills ===
- Lakshmi Mills
- Radhakrishna Mills
- Tirupur Textile Mills
- Varadaraja Mills

=== Hospitals ===
- Aravind Eye Hospital
- G. Kuppusamy Naidu Memorial Hospital
- Kovai Medical Center Hospital (KMCH)
- Lotus Eye Care Hospital
- PSG Hospitals

=== Exhibition Venues ===
  - Padmavathi Ammal Cultural Center
  - CODDISIA Trade Fair Grounds

=== Major Flyovers ===
- Avinashi Road Expressway, Coimbatore
- Avinashi Road flyover
- Hope College Flyover

== Coimbatore Metro ==
Coimbatore Metro feasibility study is completed and one of the route planned from Kaniyur through Avinashi road till Ukkadam Bus stand covering 26 km.
