= Peelamedu =

Coimbatore, Tamil Nadu, India

- Neighbourhood
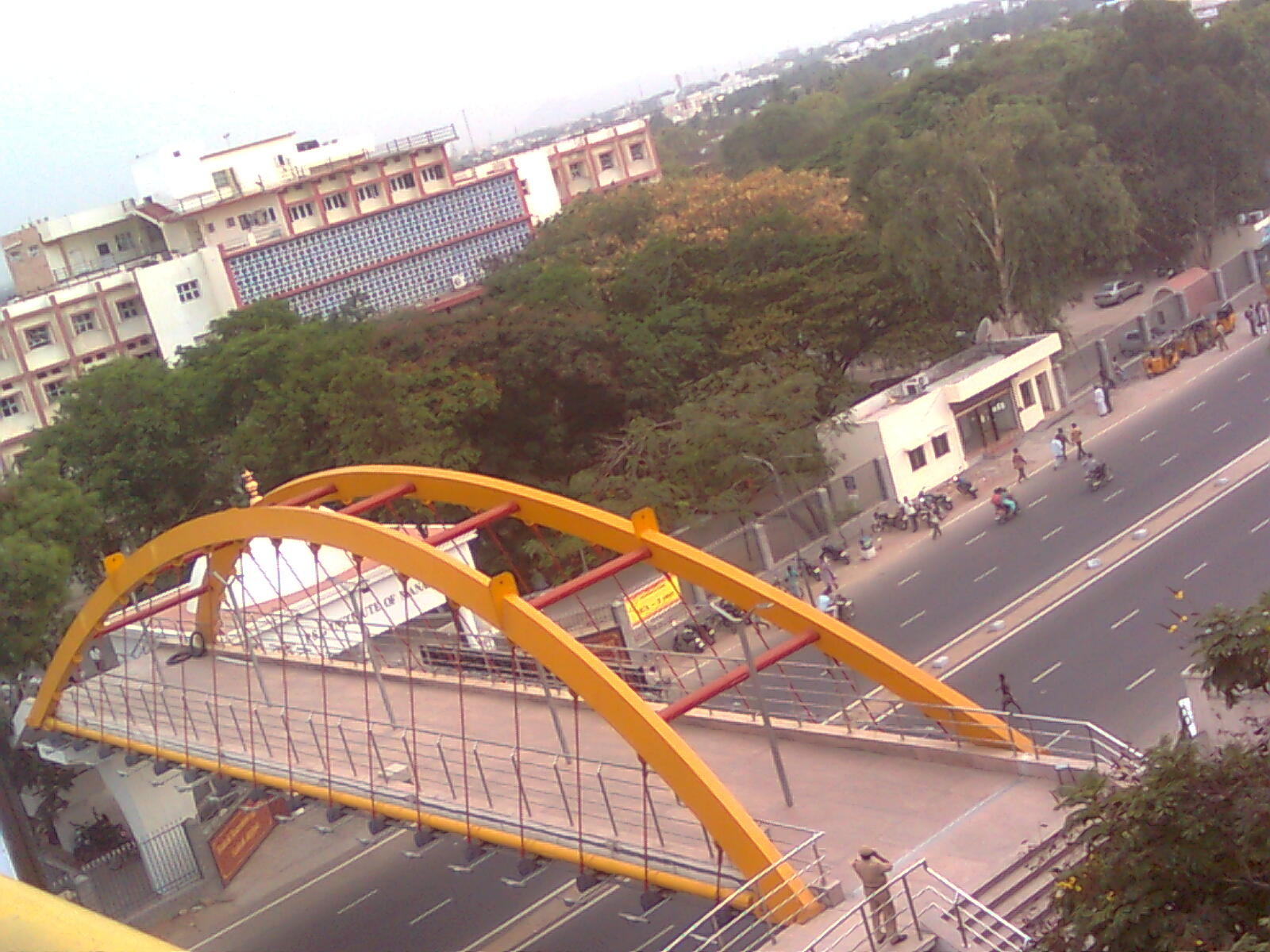
- PSG Bridge, Avinashi Road, Peelamedu (2016)

- Location in Tamil Nadu, IndiaIndial
- Coordinates: 11.0266292°N 77.0212188°E
- Country: India
- State: Tamil Nadu
- District: Coimbatore
- Metro: Coimbatore

Area
  - Total: 7 km^{2} (2.7 sq mi)
- Elevation: 418 m (1,371 ft)

Languages
  - Official: Tamil
- Time zone: UTC+5:30 (IST)
- PIN: 641004
- Telephone code: 91–422
- Vehicle registration: TN 37 (Peelamedu RTO)
- Lok Sabha constituency: Coimbatore
- Vidhan Sabha constituency: Singanallur

Peelamedu is a major commercial centre and residential locality in the Eastern part of the city of Coimbatore in Tamil Nadu, India. It is governed by Coimbatore City Municipal Corporation since 1981. The growth of Peelamedu during the last decade can be cited due to the growth of the IT sector in Coimbatore. The rapid growth of Peelamedu as a commercial and residential hub could be attributed to its geographical advantage in terms of the connectivity to other parts of the city. It acts as an important hub connecting the rapidly growing business class Information Technology corridor. The Peelamedu area stretches from Nava India to the Coimbatore International Airport near SITRA, encompassing major educational institutions, hospitals, and Industries.

== History ==
The foundation stone for "Peelamedu" was laid in November 11, 1711. It was after much persuasion that the King of Mysore, Kanthirava Narasaraja II, granted a permission to Naidu Community people to establish the Peelamedu village On 11 November 2011, Peelamedu celebrated the locality's 300th anniversary with special arrangement in schools and colleges and poojas in temples.

== Etymology ==
The name "Peelamedu" is derived from "Poolai Medu". The area with an elevation of 418 metres and Poolai flowers plantation abundant then in 1711, the locality was named as "Poolaimedu".

== Geography ==
Avinashi Road, Coimbatore is maintained by the Highways and Minor Ports Department. This 17-km stretch of road running diagonally across this suburb has become the hub of business for Peelamedu. The other major arterial roads include Kamarajar Road, Fun Mall Road, Gandhimanagar Road, Tidel Park Road and Cheranmangar Road, Sowripalayam Road.

Peelamedu is surrounded by localities such as Pappanaickenpalayam, Uppilipalayam, Singanallur, Varadharajapuram, Gandhimanagar, Vilankurichi, Ganapathymanagar, Chinniampalayam, Kalapatti and SIHS Colony.

== Economy ==
Major textile and wet grinder industries and a considerable number of foundries and motor/pump industries of the district are also located here. It is the educational hub of Coimbatore, with renowned Medical, Paramedical, Engineering, Arts & Science colleges and many famous schools situated here.

== Infrastructure ==
=== Avinashi Road Flyover ===
The GD Naidu Elevated Expressway is a 10.01-kilometre-long (6.22 mi), four-lane, elevated expressway located in the city of Coimbatore, Tamil Nadu, India. The corridor begins near the Uppilipalayam Flyover and ends near the Goldwins junction over the Avinashi Road, the most important arterial road in the city bypassing over 12 traffic intersections.

=== Railway Flyovers ===
A railway flyover is under construction near Tidel Park. Peelamedu RS Flyover was opened in 2016 to avoid traffic congestion.

== Temples ==
In the area, Temple like

- Sri Kari Varadharaja Perumal temple
- Sri Murugan temple
- Periya Mariamman Temple
- Ashtamsa Varadha Anjaneyar Temple
- Meenakshi Sundareswarar Temple
- Akilandeshwari Temple
- Peelamedu Mariamman Kovil
- Saibaba Temple, Bharathi Colony

== Multi-Speciality Hospitals ==
- PSG Institute of Medical Sciences & Research
- Kovai Medical Center and Hospital
- Aravind Eye Hospitals
- Lotus Eye Hospital and Institute

== Major Malls ==
- Fun Republic Mall

== Educational institutions ==
Peelamedu is a center of education in Coimbatore

=== Colleges ===
- PSG College of Technology
- PSG Institute of Medical Sciences & Research
- PSG College of Arts and Science
- PSG institute of Management
- Sardar Vallabhbhai Patel International School of Textiles & Management
- Coimbatore Medical College
- KMCH Medical College
- Coimbatore Institute of Technology
- Government Polytechnic, Coimbatore
- Dr G R Damodaran College of Science
- PSGR Krishnammal College for Women
- S.N.R. Sons College
- Hindusthan College of Arts and Science

=== Schools ===
- PSG Sarvajana Higher Secondary School
- Sri Gopal Naidu Higher Secondary School
- Sri Gopal Naidu Children's School (Nursery &Primary)
- ABC Marticulation Higher Secondary School
- PSG PUBLIC SCHOOLS
- G R Damodaran Schools
- PSGG Kanya Gurukulam Higher Secondary School for Girls
- G Ramasamy Naidu Matriculation Higher Secondary School
- GRG Matriculation Higher Secondary School
- National Model Schools
- Shri K K Naidu Higher Secondary School
- Smt D Padmavathi Ammal School
- Geethanjali Matriculation Higher Secondary School

=== IT Parks/ IT Companies ===
- Tidel Park Coimbatore
- ELCOT IT Park
- ELCOT SEZ
- Hanudev Infopark
- Accenture
- Capgemini
- Wipro Technologies
- Tech Mahindra
- IBM
- Dassault Systèmes
- State Street Corporation
- UST
- Morgan Stanley

=== Other Places ===
- The South India Textile Research Association
- Suguna Kalyana Mandapam
- Kasthuri Srinivasan Art Gallery
- Coimbatore District Small Industries Association (CODISSIA complex)
- Padmavati Cultural Centre
- Hanudev Infopark

=== Media & Production House ===
- SN Productions [Signature of Creations]
- MR.Local Creations

== Coimbatore International Airport ==
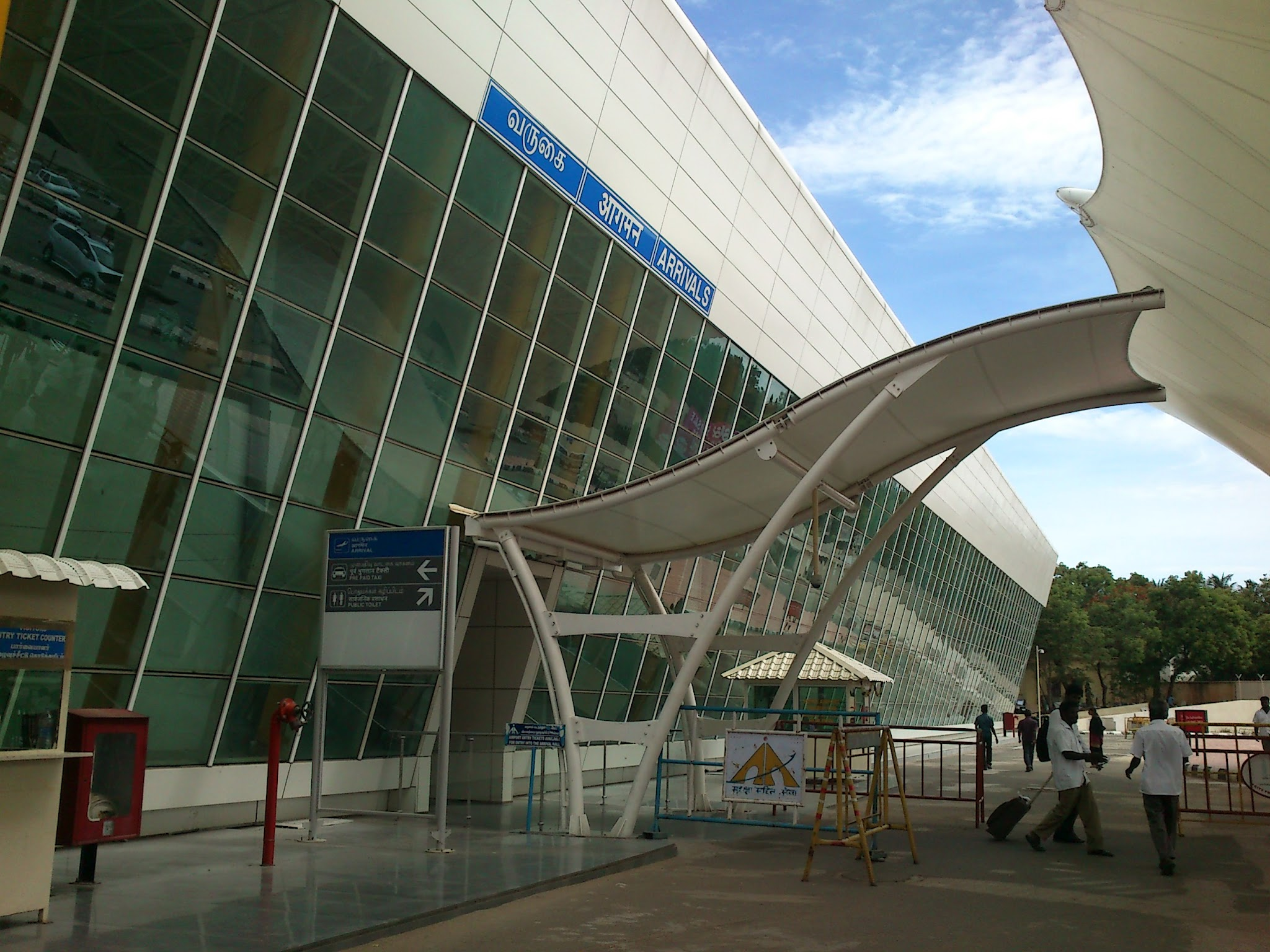
Coimbatore International Airport.

Coimbatore International Airport is the second largest and busiest airport in the state of Tamilnadu is located at Peelamedu.

== Connectivity ==
Peelamedu has easy access to :

- Townhall : Via Avinashi Road and State Bank Road
- Gandhipuram : Via Western Avinashi Road and Bharathiyar Road
- Coimbatore Integrated Bus Terminus : Via Kamarajar Road and Vellalore Road
- Ukkadam : Via Western Avinashi Road and Townhall
- Singanallur Bus Terminus : Via Kamarajar Road
- Railway Station : Via Avinashi Road and State Bank Road
- Coimbatore International Airport : Via Eastern Avinashi Road

== Coimbatore Metro ==
Coimbatore Metro feasibility study is completed and one of the routes planned from Ukkadam Bus Terminus to Kaniyur via Peelamedu and Coimbatore International Airport covering 27 km.

== Politics ==
The locality of Peelamedu is a part of Singanallur (state assembly constituency) and Coimbatore (Lok Sabha constituency).
