= G. D. Naidu Elevated Expressway =

Expressway in Coimbatore

GD Naidu Elevated Expressway
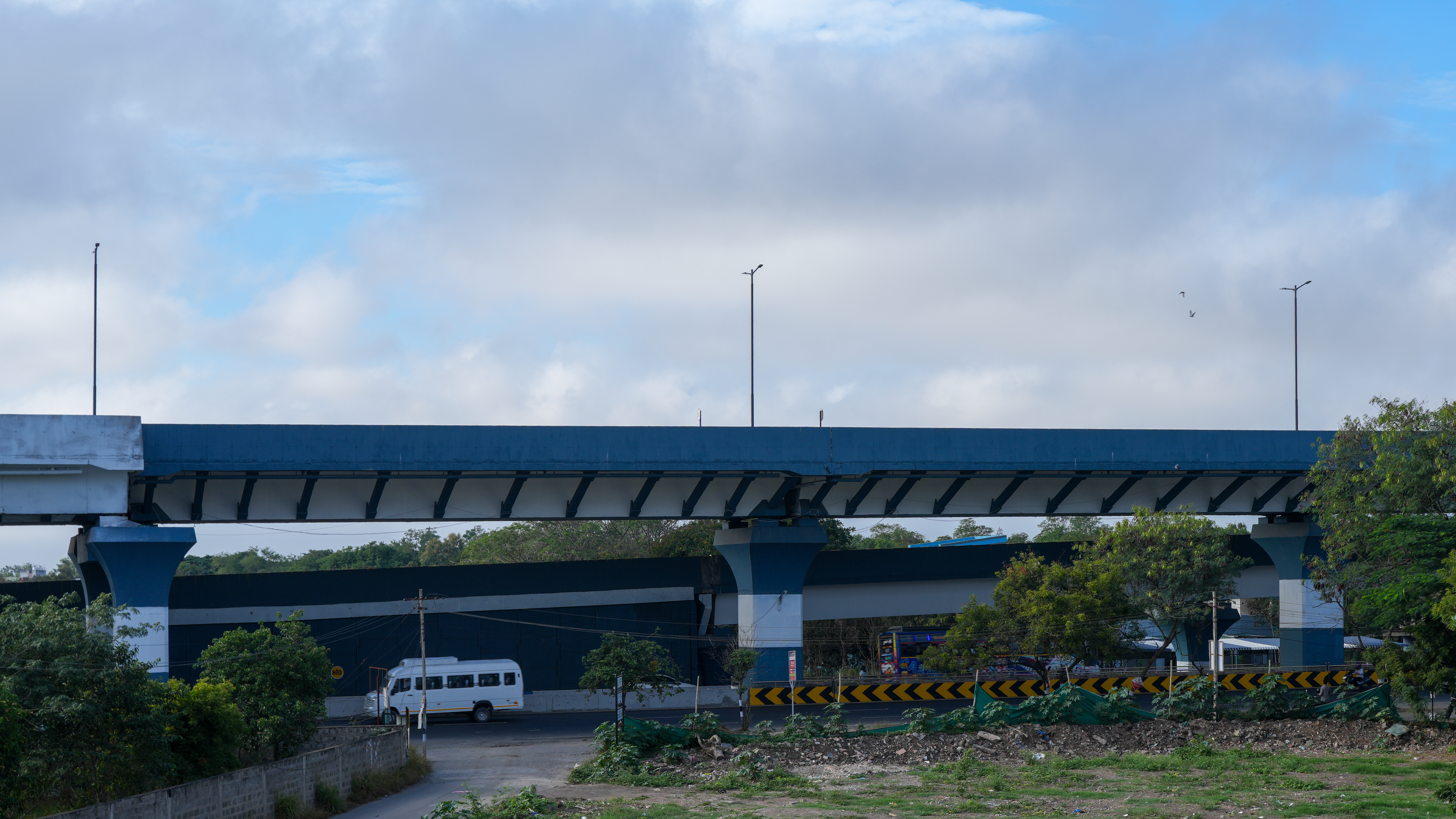

Route information
- Maintained by Department of Highways and Minor Ports (Tamil Nadu)
- Length: 10.10 km (6.28 mi)
- Existed: October 2025–present

Major junctions
- North end: Uppilipalayam, Coimbatore
- South end: Goldwins, Coimbatore

Location
- Country: India

Highway system
- Roads in India; Expressways; National; State; Asian

The GD Naidu Elevated Expressway, also known as Avinashi Road Flyover, is a 10.01 km (6.22 mi) four-lane flyover in Coimbatore, Tamil Nadu, India. The eastern end of the Uppilipalayam flyover and Goldwins junction in Peelamedu serve as its termini. It traverses along the Avinashi road, one of the arterial roads in the city, and bypasses about 12 traffic intersections. It is the longest elevated corridor in the state, and the second longest in India after the P. V. Narasimha Rao Expressway in Hyderabad. It is named after Indian inventor G. D. Naidu.

== History ==
An elevated road project to decongest the Avinashi road, one of the arterial roads in the city, was proposed in 2019. The ₹17.91 billion (US$190 million) project was approved by the Government of Tamil Nadu in August 2020 and was planned to be built by the National Highways Authority of India. The highway was inaugurated by Chief Minister of Tamil Nadu, M. K. Stalin, in October 2025, and was renamed after Indian inventor G. D. Naidu.

== Structure ==
The 10.10 km (6.28 mi) long, 17.25 m (56.6 ft) wide elevated road traverses along the Avinashi Road. The eastern end of the Uppilipalayam flyover and Goldwins junction in Peelamedu serve as its termini. It bypasses 12 existing traffic intersections on the Avinashi road. The flyover traverses above the flyover at Hope College junction with two smaller bridges. The flyover has four entry and exit ramps to facilitate vehicular movement and distribution to other arterial roads.
