= Fun Republic Mall (Coimbatore) =

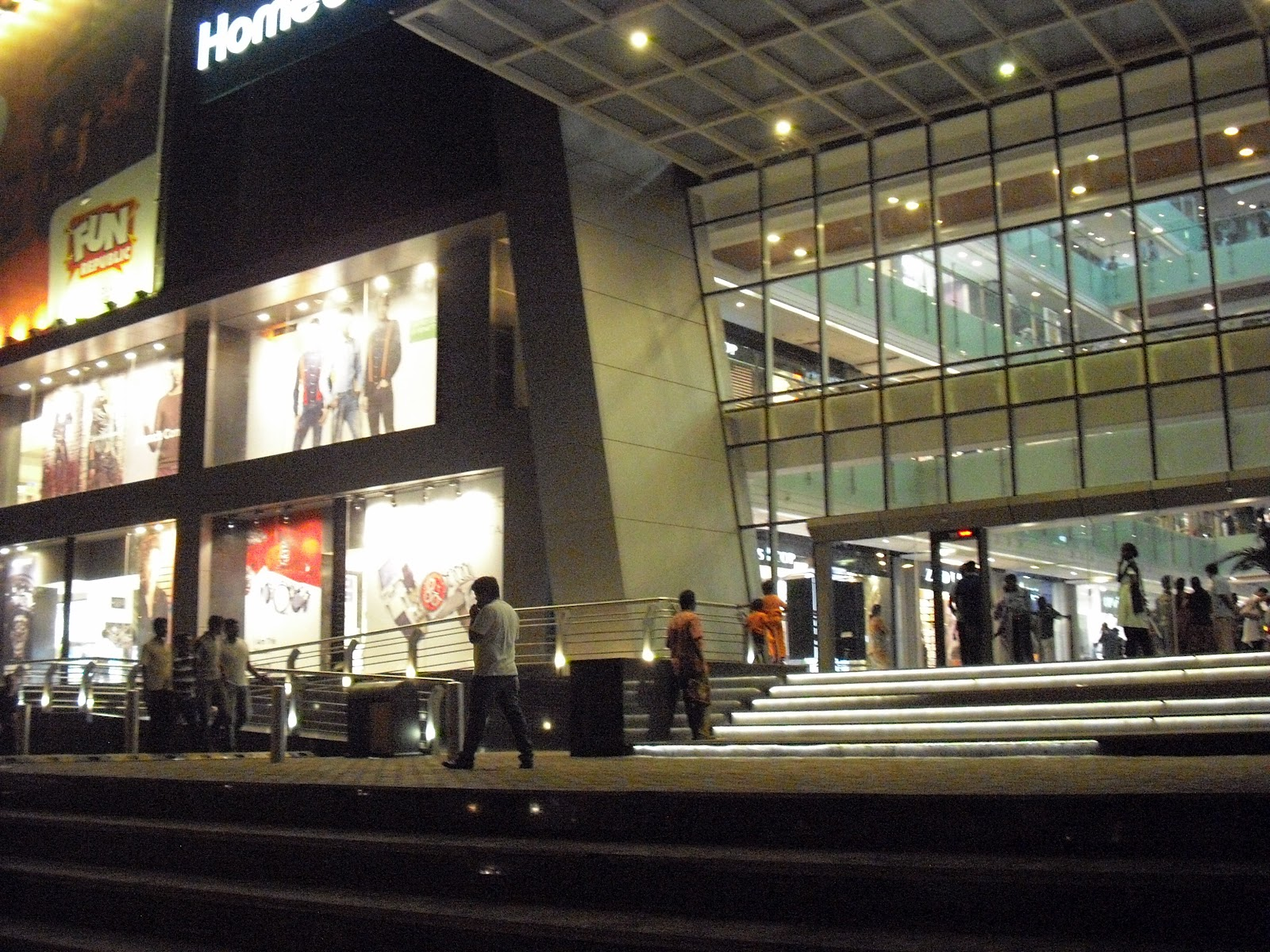
- Location: Coimbatore, Tamil Nadu, India
- Coordinates: 11.024437°N 77.010622°E
- Address: Avinashi Road, Peelamedu
- Opened: August 2012
- Developer: Essel Group
- Floor area: 325,000 sq ft (30,200 m^{2})
- Floors: 6
- Parking: Multistorey Parking lot

Fun Republic Mall is a shopping mall in Peelamedu, Coimbatore, India. This shopping mall was inaugurated on 19 August 2012 and Managed by E-city Ventures which is part of the Essel Group. It is located on the arterial Avinashi Road on a 3.5-acre site, with 6 levels and a total area of 3.25 lakh sq.ft. Shoppers Stop is its anchor store and occupies over 79,000 sq. ft. The mall also features a five screen multiplex operated by Cinépolis theatre with a capacity of 1,119 seats, and a McDonald's restaurant spread over 3,470 sq. ft on two floors in addition to its food court.

Barbeque Nation has an outlet in the Mall at 3rd Floor.

Fun Cinemas has an outlet in the Mall at 4th Floor.
