= PSG Group =

Indian business conglomerate

PSG and Sons
- Founded: 1926
- Founder: P. S. Govindasamy Naidu (1856 – 1918)
- Purpose: "Let there be charity so that other people may share my family's prosperity"
- Location: Coimbatore, India
- Origins: Coimbatore, India
- Region served: India
- Method: education, healthcare and service
- Key people: L. Gopalakrishnan, Managing trustee
- Website: psgsonscharities.org

PSG and Sons is a conglomerate involved in education, healthcare and community service in Coimbatore, India.

== History ==
The group was established as PSG & Sons' charities in 1926 by the four sons of P.S. Govindasamy Naidu namely Venkataswamy Naidu, Rangaswamy Naidu, Ganga Naidu and Narayanaswamy Naidu. The trust was established with the purpose of starting a sarvajana ("omniscient") school when a family member was denied admission to existing schools run by British. The four brothers voluntarily divided their ancestral properties into five parts, reserving the one fifth amounting to ₹ 2.01 lakhs to create a charity trust. The trust later established various educational institutions, health facilities and industrial institutes.

== PSG Family ==
PSG Family

	P S Govindasamy Naidu		Manguthayammal
P S G Venkataswamy Naidu	{{{WoPSGV}}}	P S G Rangaswamy Naidu	Krishnammal	P S G Ganga Naidu	{{{WoPSGG}}}	P S G Narayanaswamy Naidu	{{{WoPSGN}}}

PSGR Family

	P S G Rangaswamy Naidu		Krishnammal
Lakshmi Ammal	G. R. Damodaran	Rukmani Ammal	G R Govindarajulu	G R Venkatesalu	G R Varatharajan

== Institutions ==
The institutions run by the charity include:

- PSG Sarvajana Higher Secondary school (1924)
- PSG Industrial Institute (1926)
- PSG Polytechnic College (1939)
- PSG Primary School, Vedapatti (1941)
- PSG Primary School, Peelamedu (1943)
- PSG College of Arts and Science (1947)
- PSG College of Technology (1951)
- PSG & Sons’ Charities Metallurgy and Foundry division (1974)
- PSG Institute of Medical Sciences & Research (1985)
- PSG Industrial Training Centre (1986)
- PSG Hospitals (1989)
- PSG Centre for Sponsored Research and Consultancy (1989)
- PSG Centre for Non-formal and Continuing Education (1989)
- PSG College of Nursing (1994)
- PSG Institute of Management (1994)
- PSG College of Physiotherapy (1999)
- PSG College of Pharmacy (2001)
- PSG Public Schools (2002)
- PSG High School, Vedapatti (2005)
- PSG Institute of Advanced Studies (2006)
- PSG Children's school (2009)
- PSG Vishnugranthi (2013)
- PSG Institute of Technology and Applied Research (2014)
- PSG Centre for Academic Research and Excellence (2015)
- PSG Software Technologies (2017)
- PSG Institute of Architecture and Planning (2021)
