= Ashtamsa Varadha Anjaneyar Temple =

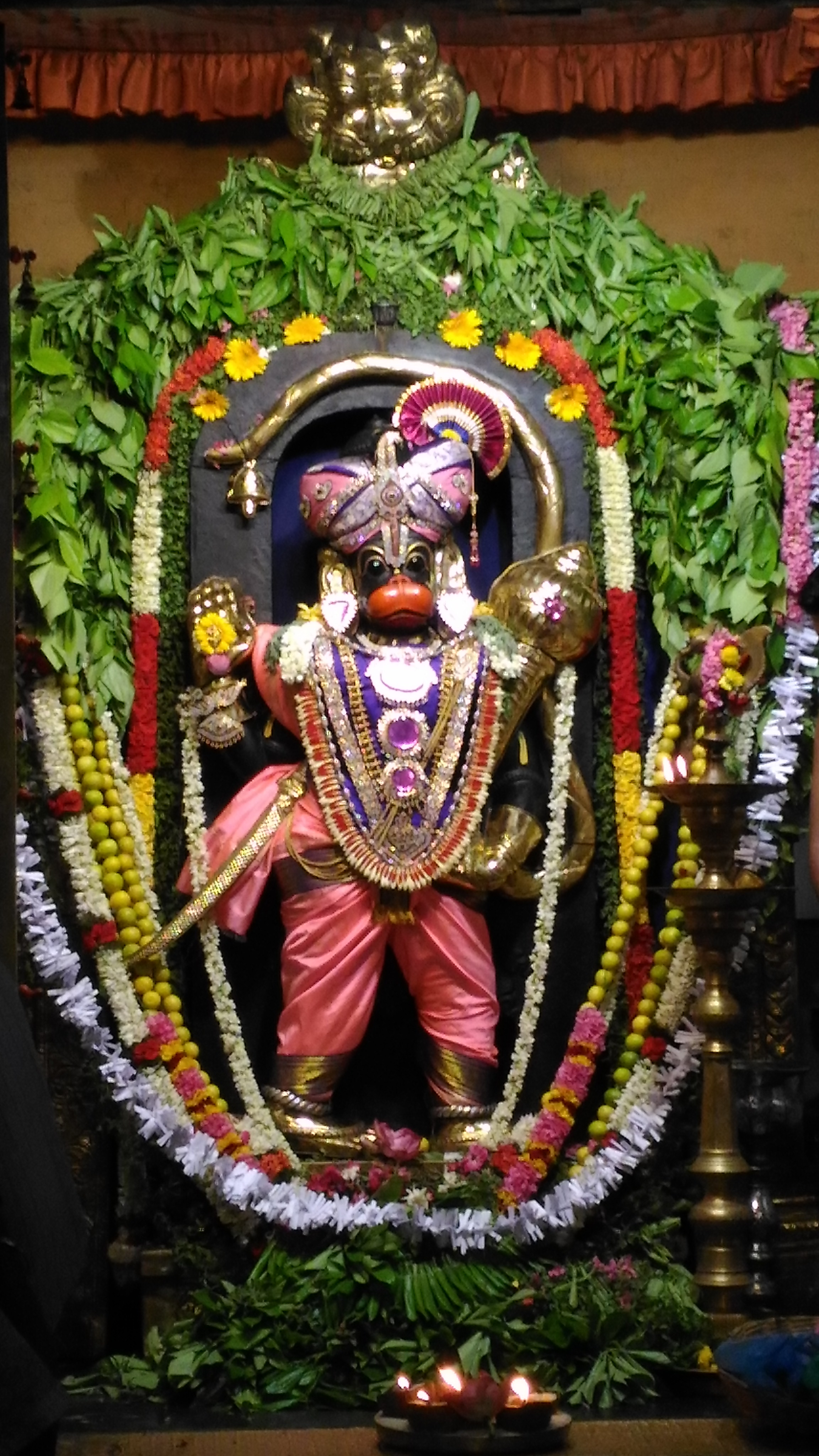
- Lord Hanuman in Raja alankaram

- Location within Tamil Nadu

Religion
- Affiliation: Hinduism
- Deity: Anjaneyar

Location
- Location: Peelamedu, Coimbatore
- State: Tamil Nadu
- Country: India
- Interactive map of Ashtamsa Varadha Anjaneyar Temple
- Coordinates: 11°01′16″N 76°59′49″E

Architecture
- Completed: 2004

Website
- Sri Ashtamsa Varadha Anjaneyar Temple

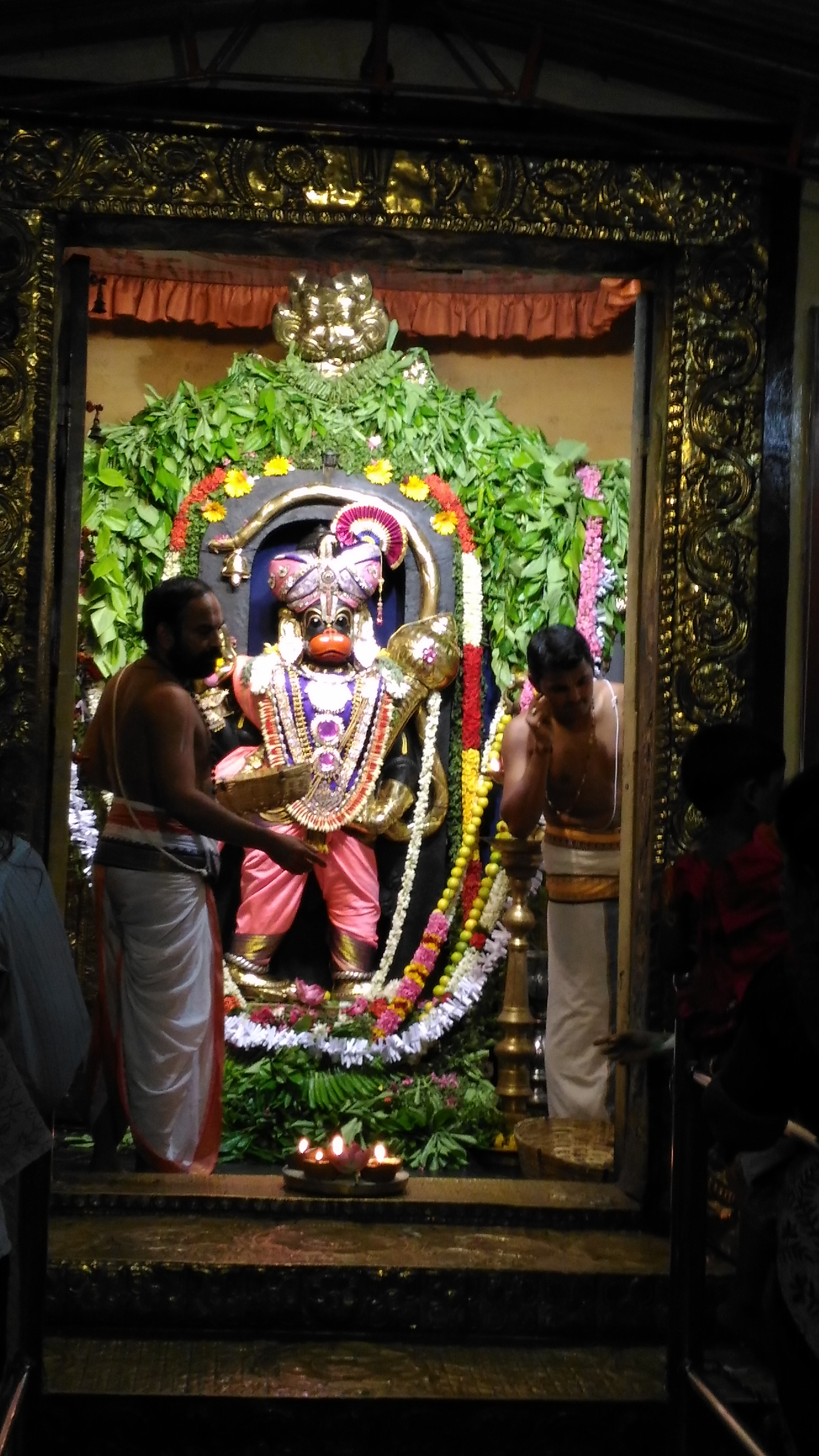
Priest performing rituals after alankaram

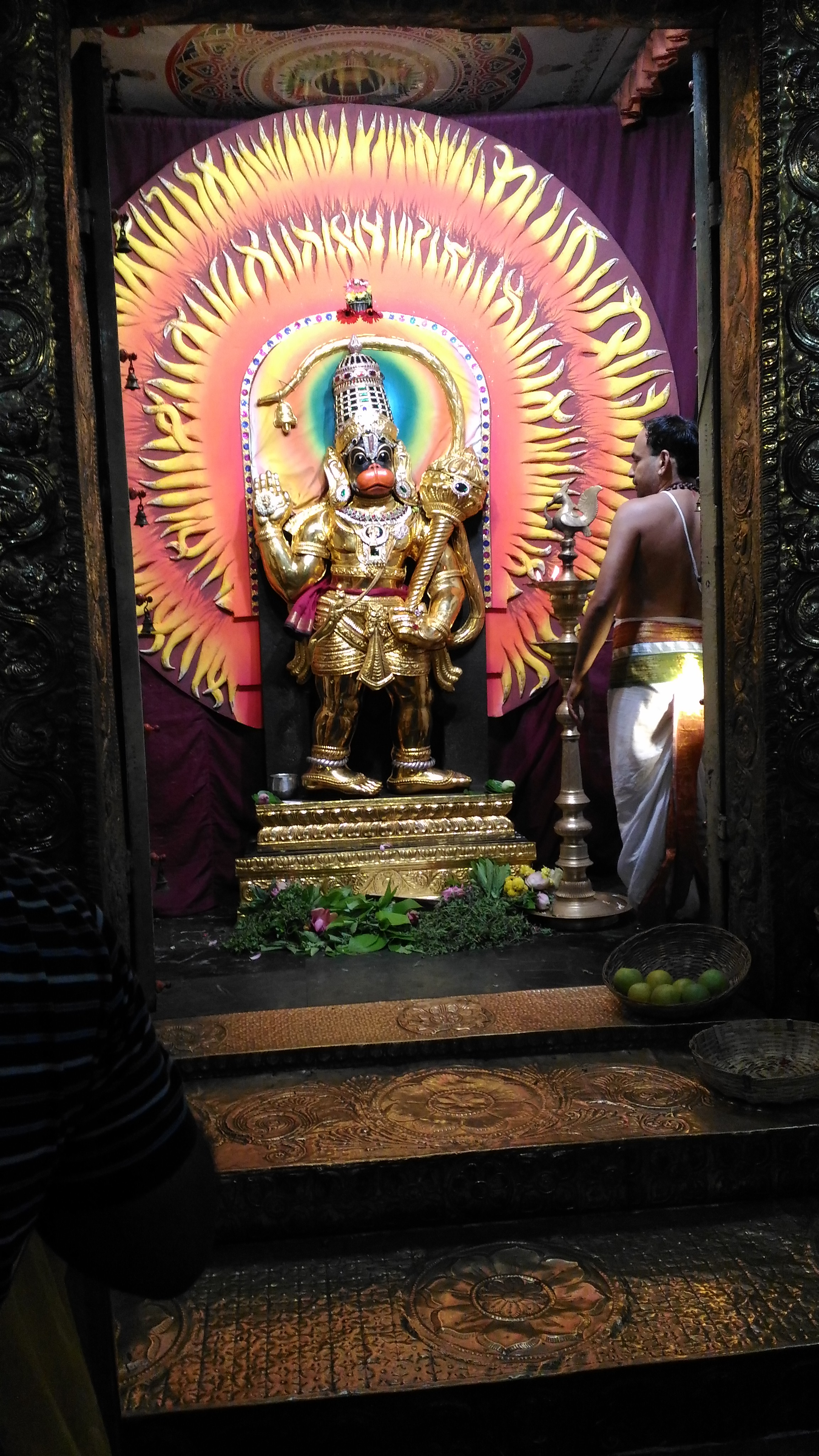
Lord Hanuman, in one of his glorious alankaram

Sri Ashtamsa Varadha Anjaneyar Temple is a Hindu temple dedicated to Hanuman located in Peelamedu, Coimbatore, Tamil Nadu, India. The idol of the deity is made of Salagrama stone. In the temple, Goddess Lakshmi graces the devotees from the right palm of Hanuman who tail faces North, direction of Kubera, God of wealth. The main deity faces west, is seen posing Abhaya Mudra with his right hand and holding a mace with the other hand. During the Tamil New Year, an offering of 10,008 fruits is made to the deity. Raja Maruthi Alankaram, Vennai Alankaram and Vadamalai offerings are the regular Sevas here on Saturdays. In the Tamil month of Purattasi, Vadai Malai, Swaya Roopam, Chenduram, Swarnamayam and Muthangi Sevai are offered to God on Saturdays.

Lord Hanuman, is decorated in different alankaram each day, which makes this temple very unusual. So don't be surprised to see Lord Hanuman gracing you in his various alankaram during your routine visit.

== Best day to visit ==
Since everyday Lord Hanuman graces devotees with different alankaram, one can visit the temple any day. Still there special days

- Every Saturday
- Tamil month of Purattasi, which starts from mid-September to mid-October of the Gregorian calendar

== Location ==
The temple is located in Tamil Nadu, Coimbatore, Nava India, near Peelamedu, near to Hindustan College of Arts and Science.

- Hanuman Jayanti
