= Kasturiswami Sreenivasan =

Kasthuri Sreenivasn
- Born: 12 May 1917; Karadibavi, Madras Presidency, British India
- Died: 5 July 1991 (aged 74)
- Known for: Founder Director SITRA
- Spouse: Barbara Sreenivasan
- Awards: Padma Bhushan, 1969

Kasthuri Sreenivasan or Kasturiswami Sreenivasan (12 May 1917 – 5 July 1991) was an Indian textile technologist, industrial sociologist and prolific author.

He was born in Karadivavi, a small village near Coimbatore. He did his undergraduate in Physics from Presidency College, Chennai, and then a Masters in Textile Technology at the College of Technology, Manchester, England.

He was the founding director of The South India Textile Research Association. For his contributions to building that institution, he was awarded the Padma Bhushan by the Govt. of India in 1969.

He founded the Kasthuri Sreenivasan Art Gallery And Textile Museum in Coimbatore in 1983. as well as the Coimbatore Cancer Foundation in 1991, following his battle with cancer.
