= PSG Institute of Medical Sciences & Research =

Medical Institute in Tamil Nadu, India

Coordinates: 11.0247°N 77.00298°E

PSG Institute of Medical Sciences and Research
- Motto: Know. Share. Heal.
- Type: Private
- Established: 30 September 1985; 40 years ago
- Affiliations: Tamil Nadu Dr. M.G.R. Medical University
- Principal: Dr. Tadury Madhukar Subbarao
- Director: Dr. J. S. Bhuvaneswaran
- Undergraduates: 750
- Location: Coimbatore, Tamil Nadu, India
- Campus: Urban
- Nickname: PSG IMSR
- Website: psgimsr.ac.in

PSG Institute of Medical Sciences and Research is a teaching hospital and research institute located in Peelamedu, Coimbatore. It was established in 1985 as a part of PSG Group. It has NABH accreditation. PSG Hospitals, a 1400-bed, tertiary care hospital was recently awarded with JCI prime certification and has become the first hospital in Tamil Nadu to receive the accreditation. The hospital is affiliated to the PSG Institute of Medical Sciences and Research and has been recognized as an institution that offers students with multiple facilities at the undergraduate and postgraduate level. PSG Institute of Paramedical Sciences and Nursing are associated with the institute.

== Teaching ==
PSG Institute of Medical Sciences and Research offers teaching from undergraduate to postgraduate levels.

== Rankings ==
University and college rankings

Medical – India
- NIRF (2024): 41
- Private colleges
- Outlook India (2022): 4

Pharmacy – India
- NIRF (2023): 61

The PSG College of Pharmacy was ranked 27 among medical colleges. and ranked 4th in Outlook India's private medical college ranking in 2022

PSG received its JCI-PRIME certification on August 24, 2021.
