= South India Textile Research Association =

Indian research association

The South India Textile Research Association
- Abbreviation: SITRA
- Formation: 25 December 1955
- Type: Non-governmental organization
- Purpose: Textile Research
- Headquarters: Coimbatore, India
- Region served: Asia, Africa
- Official languages: English
- Chairman: Sanjay Jayavarthanavelu
- Website: www.sitra.org.in

The South India Textile Research Association, often known by acronym SITRA, is a textile research association established in 1956 at Coimbatore, India. SITRA is an Industry sponsored research institute supported by the Ministry of Textiles, Government of India. It is considered to be one of the best equipped textile research organisations in the world and its members apart from India include Indonesia, Iran, Nigeria, Thailand, Sri Lanka, Nepal and Bangladesh.

== History ==
Coimbatore became home to textile industry of South India by Independence. The textile industry in Coimbatore and Madras state along with the Ministry of Textiles planned on a modern textile research association. The foundation stone was laid on 25 December 1955 by Prime Minister of India, Pandit Jawaharlal Nehru and inaugurated by President of India Sarvepalli Radhakrishnan on 13 October 1958. The first chairman was R. K. Shanmugam Chettiar, also India's first Finance Minister. Padma Bhushan Kasturi Sreenivasan, who was the Director from 1955 till 1982 was instrumental in establishing SITRA as a major research institute and would later become chairman of National Textile Corporation.

=== Location ===
The institute is located on Avinashi Road, Peelamedu, Coimbatore near the Airport.

Its surrounding area is known as Sitra or Chitra-a variation of its acronym.

=== Administration ===
The research center is governed by a Council of Administration consisting of member representatives of the Industry, Scientists and Government.

=== Campus and facilities ===
The campus is located on the Avinashi Road, Peelamedu, Coimbatore, and is about 32.5 acres, with a floor space of about 15,000 sq. m. The campus is equipped with textile testing instruments and modern machines, with textile testing, electronics and calibration laboratories, and a library. A pilot mill is located inside the campus to carry out real-time simulations and research. The physical and chemical laboratories are accredited by NABL in accordance with the standard ISO/IEC 17025: 1999 General Requirements for the competence of Testing and Calibration laboratories.

=== Departments ===
  - Mechanical Processing and Textile Physics (1957
  - Textile Engineering (1966)
  - Textile Instrumentation (1975)
  - Knitting (1976)
  - Textile Chemistry (1981),
  - Labour Research and Training (1982).
  - Powerloom Service Centre (1974) under a grant provided by SIMA.
  - Cotton Spinning Pilot Unit
  - Jute- blended yarn spinning mill (1994) under the aid from United Nations Development Programme (UNDP)
  - ECO testing laboratory (1996) on a special grant from the Ministry of Textiles.
  - Centre of Excellence for Medical Textiles (2009).

=== Publications ===
SITRA has its own technical journal publishing wing covering areas of future trends, labour welfare and management and publishes the ranking list for member mills as well as textile standard norm in Testing and production.
