= Coimbatore Medical College =

Medical school in Tamil Nadu, India

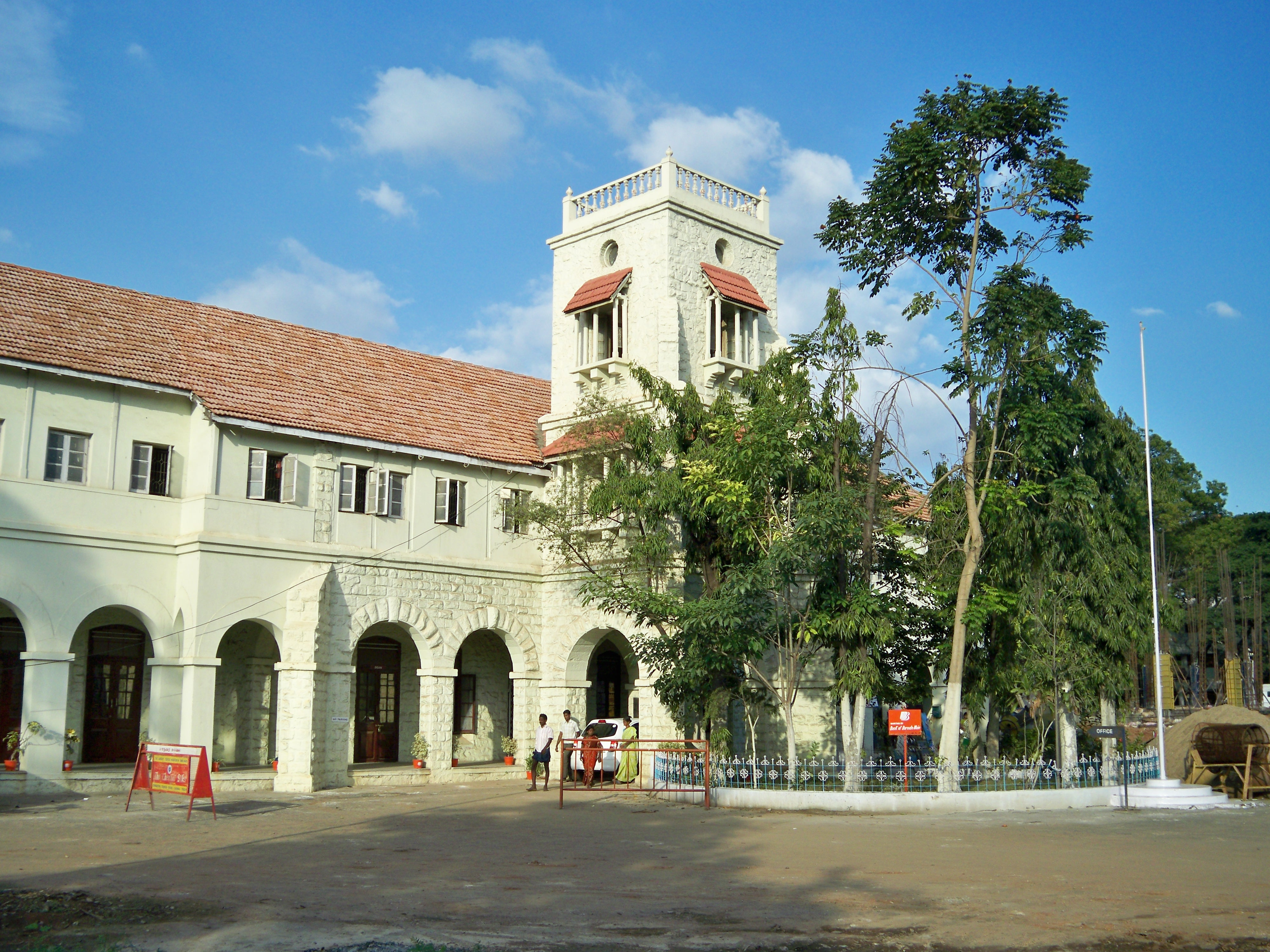
- Other name: CMC Coimbatore
- Established: 1966; 60 years ago
- Academic affiliations: Tamil Nadu Dr. M.G.R. Medical University
- Dean: Dr. M. Geethanjali
- Location: Avinashi Road, Coimbatore, Tamil Nadu, India; 11.028662°N 77.023899°E
- Campus: Semi urban area
- Website: https://www.cmccbe.tn.gov.in/?page_id=29

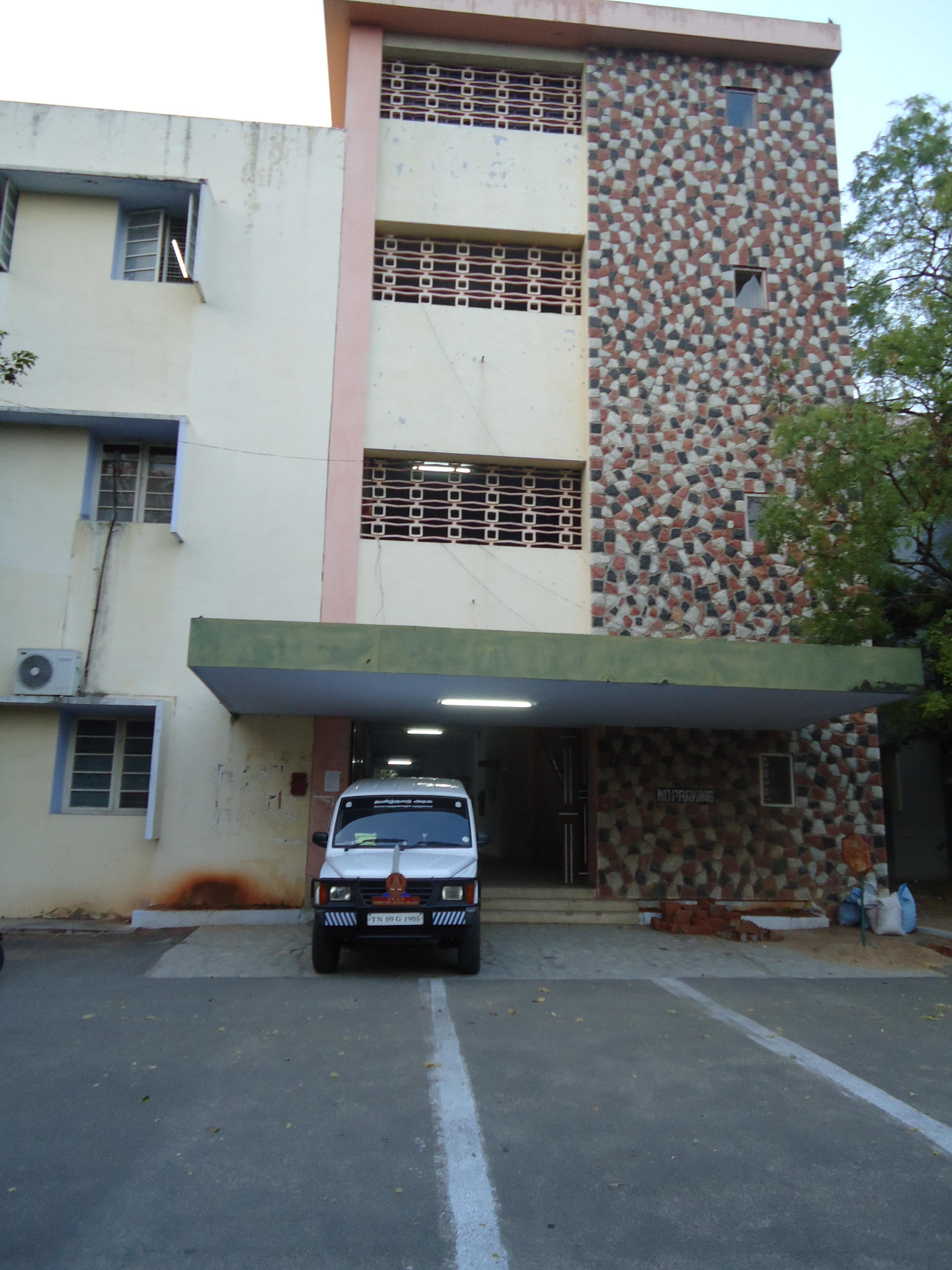
Second entrance

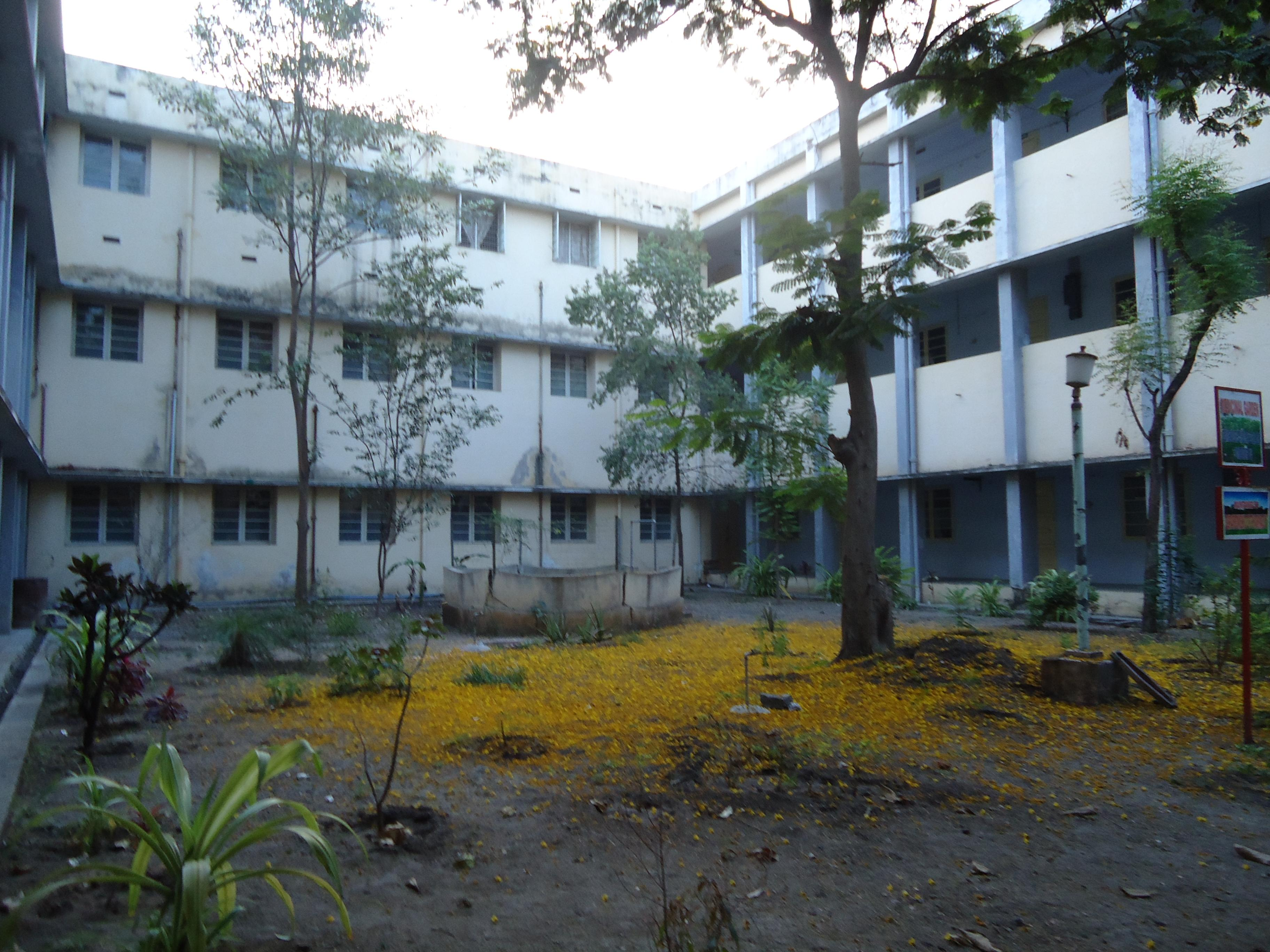
Coimbatore medical college

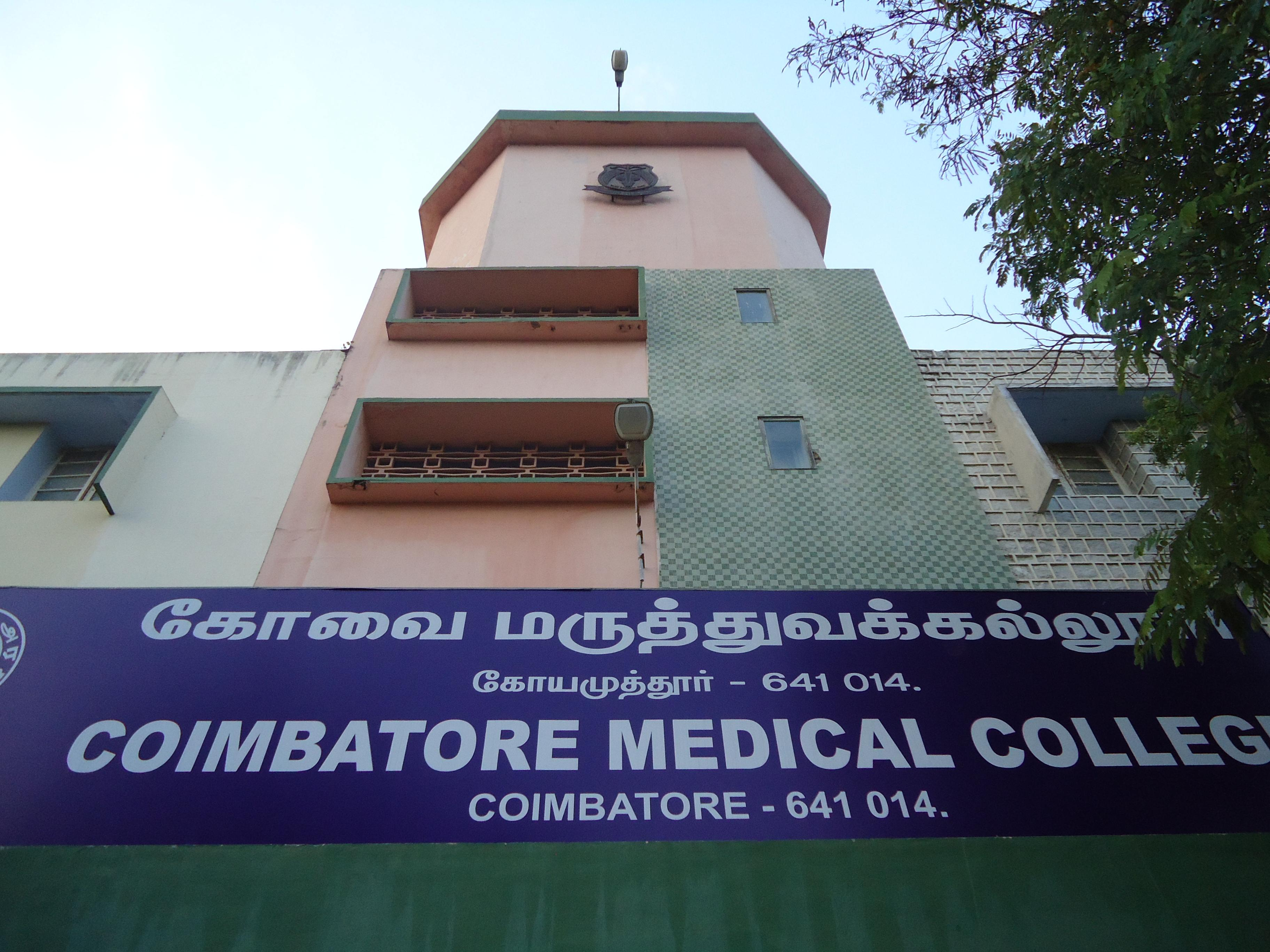
Main entrance

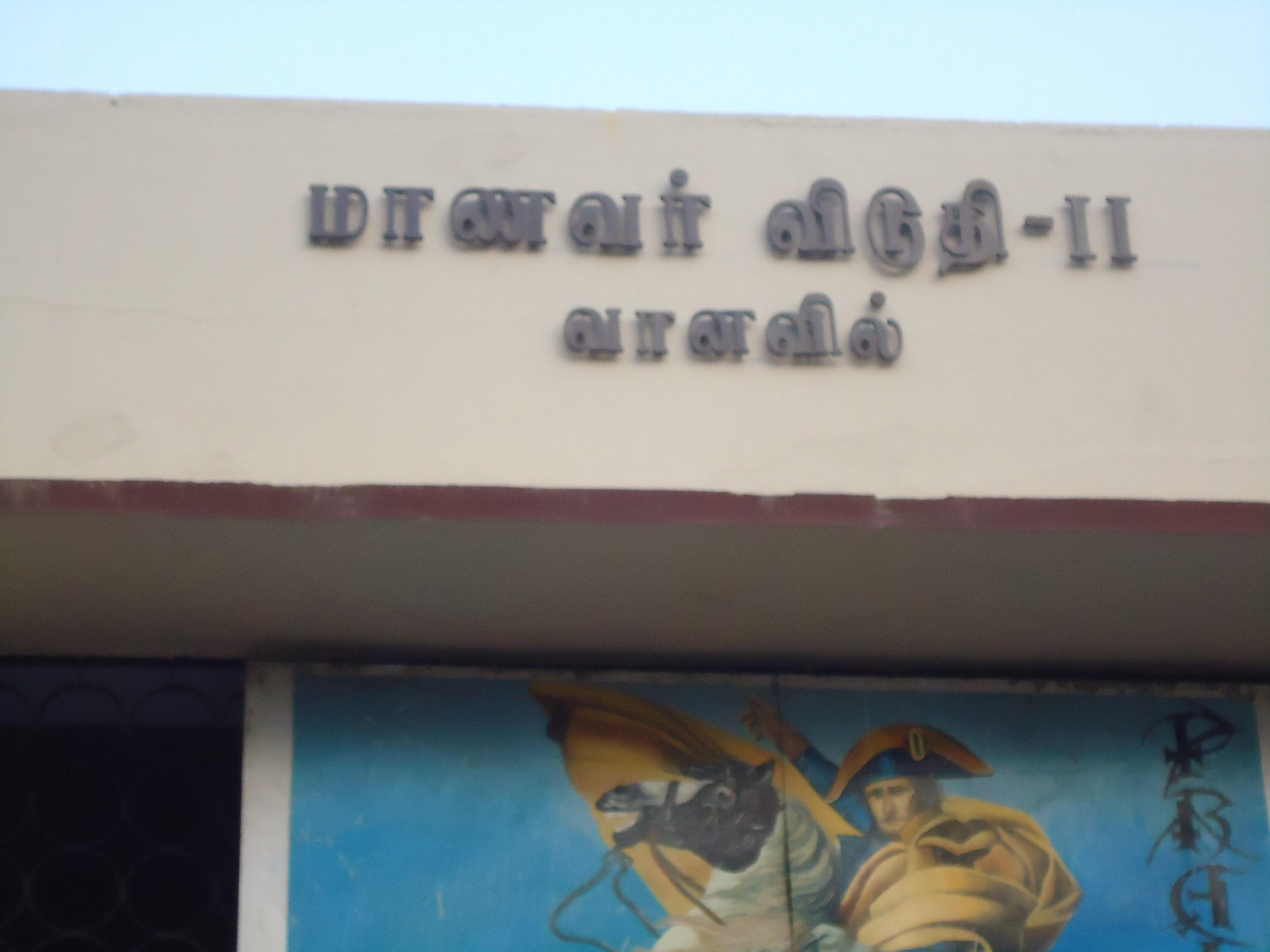
Men's hostel

The Coimbatore Medical College is a government medical college recognized by the National Medical Commission. It is located in the city of Coimbatore, in Tamil Nadu, India.

== History ==
The college was established in 1966 after G D Naidu, a scientist from an industrial family of the city, donated the 153 acres of land to the Tamil Nadu state government under the Chief Minister K. Kamaraj.

Timeline of the Coimbatore Medical College Hospital:

- 1908 – foundation stone laid by Lord Ampthill, Governor of Madras
- 14 July 1909 – The hospital was inaugurated by Governor of Madras
- 1 April 1912 – The government of Madras Province took over the hospital administration from the municipality of Coimbatore
- 13 August 1959 – Golden Jubilee celebrations of district headquarters hospital, Coimbatore was inaugurated by his excellency Sri Bishnuram Medhi, Governor of Madras, and presided by the honourable Sri Manickavelu, Minister of Health and Revenue, Madras State
- 1966 – The Coimbatore Medical College was started
- 24 November 1969 – The Directorate of Medical Education took over administration of the hospital and renamed it as Coimbatore Medical College Hospital
- July 2009 – June 2010 – Centenary year of the Coimbatore Medical College Hospital

== Location ==
The college is located on Avinashi Road, one of the arterial roads in Coimbatore city and about 2 kilometres (1.2 mi) from Coimbatore International Airport. The college is just opposite Coimbatore Institute of Technology and near to The Jenney Club. This part of the city has a concentration of colleges and hospitals.

The Coimbatore Medical College Hospital, which is located on Trichy Road near Lanka Corner, about 1 kilometre (0.62 mi) from Coimbatore Junction, was established in 1909 during the British Raj.

== Accreditation and affiliates ==
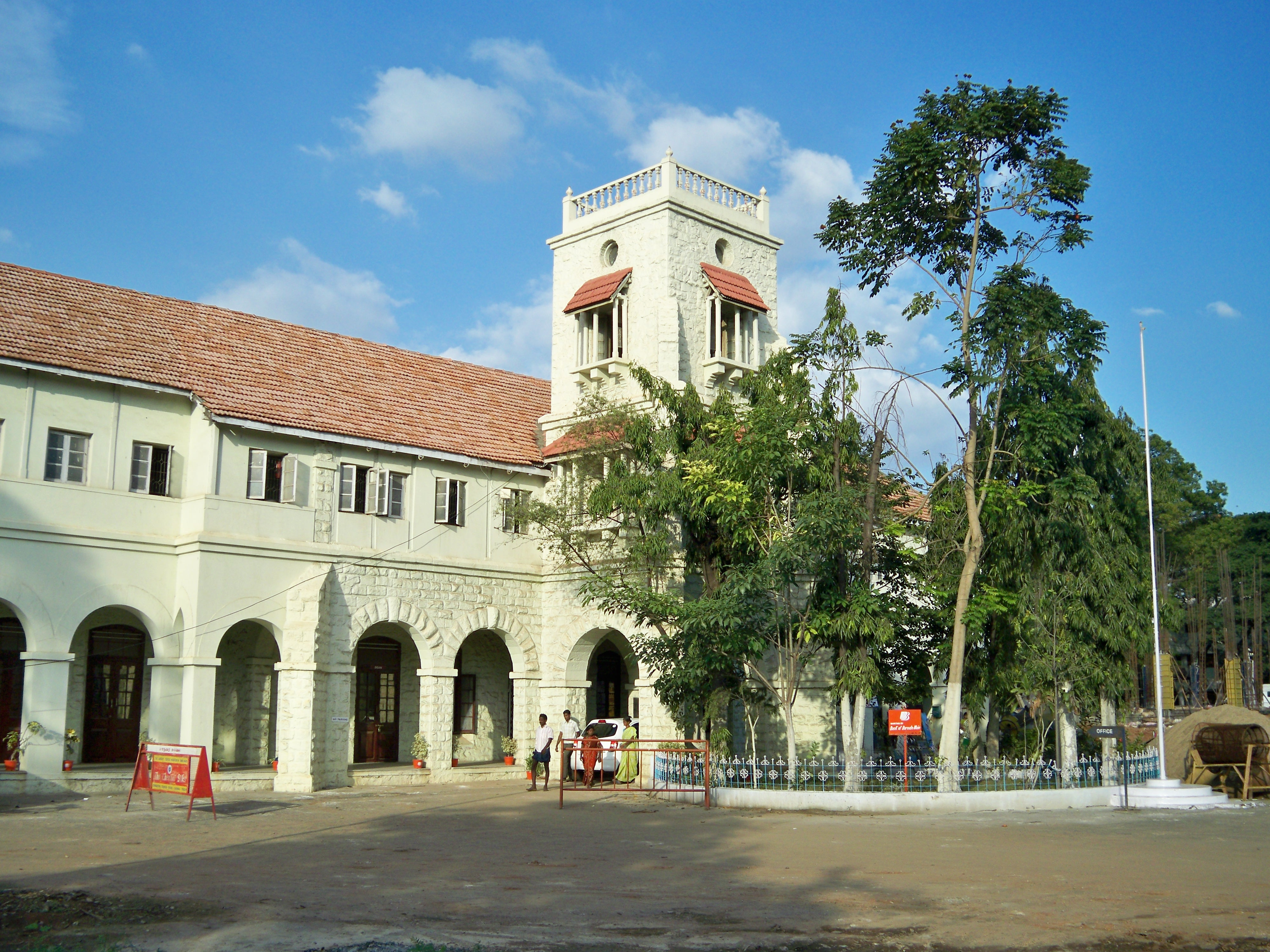
Coimbatore Medical College Hospital located on Trichy Road was built in 1909

The Government Headquarters Hospital near the Coimbatore Railway Junction is attached to the college and has been converted to a teaching medical institution. The college was affiliated to Madras University and was later transferred to Bharathiar University. Subsequently, it was affiliated to Tamil Nadu Dr. M.G.R. Medical University.

== Facilities ==
The college has 30 departments with libraries and medical laboratories.

== Courses ==
The college offers preclinical courses and elective postings, the main course being the MBBS.

- Degree courses: MD Radio-diagnosis (From 2013), MD general medicine, MD Pediatrics
- MS courses: MS general surgery, MS Orthopedics, MS OG
- Diploma courses: DGO, DCh, DA, DRDT
- MCh courses: MCh paediatric surgery, MCH Neurosurgery, MCH Plastic surgery
- Paramedical courses: Diploma in Nursing, Diploma in Pharmacy

== Controversy ==
In August 2024, A 25-year-old male individual was arrested for the act of trying to sexually assault a female surgeon at Coimbatore Medical College.
