= Barbeque Nation =

Indian multinational restaurant chain

Barbeque-Nation Hospitality Limited
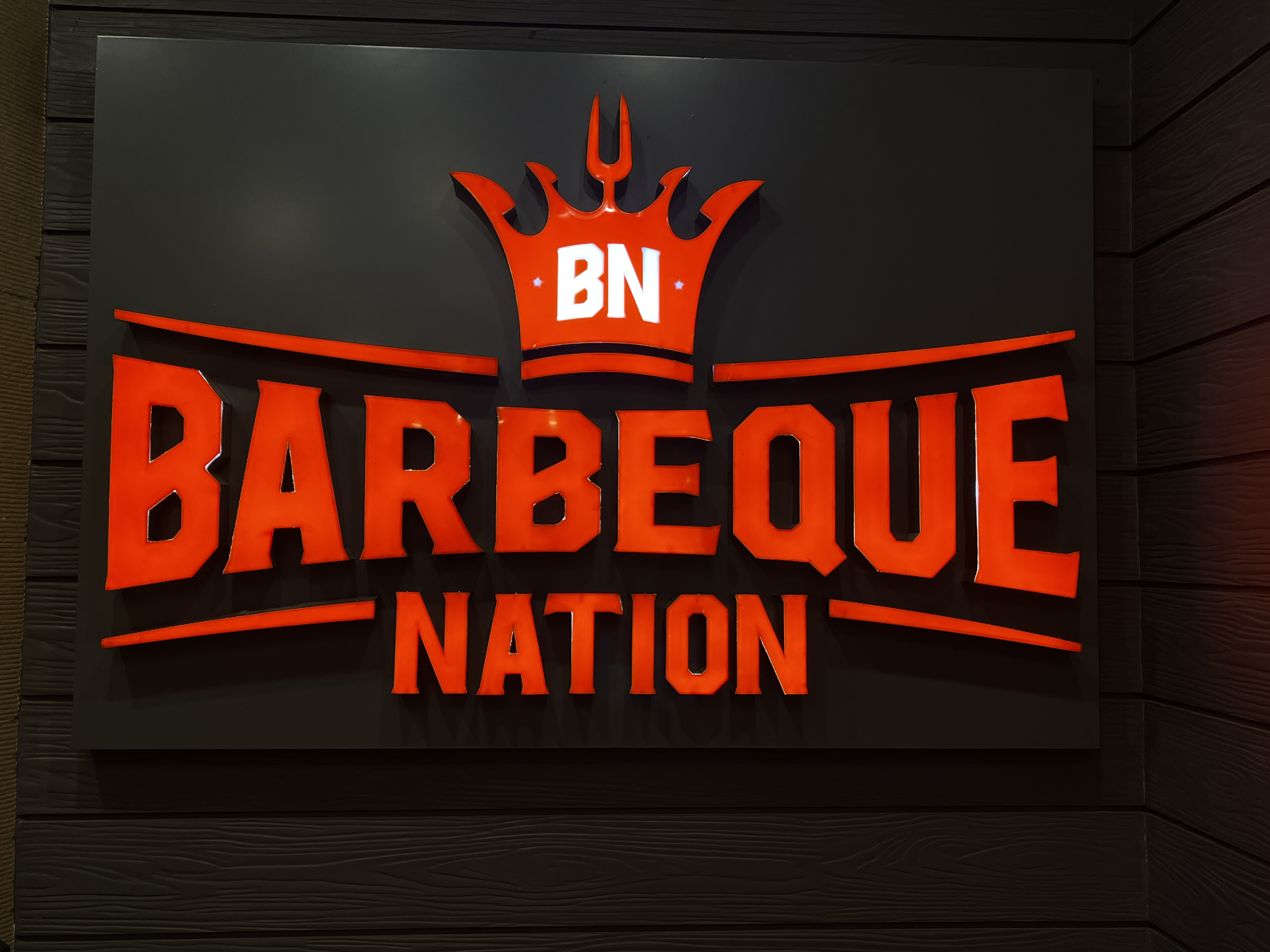
- Type: Public
- Traded as: BSE: 543283; NSE: BARBEQUE
- ISIN: INE382M01027
- Industry: Hospitality
- Founded: 2006 in Mumbai, India
- Headquarters: Bengaluru, India
- Number of locations: 200 (2026)
- Area served: Asia and Middle East
- Key people: Rahul Agrawal (CEO); Kayum Dhanani (Managing Director)
- Revenue: ▼₹1,220 crore (US$130 million) (2025)
- Subsidiaries: Red Apple Kitchen Consultancy
- Website: barbequenation.com

Barbeque-Nation Hospitality Limited, doing business as Barbeque Nation, is an Indian multinational live grill buffet barbeque restaurant chain specializing in Indian barbeque. It was established in 2006 by Prosenjit Choudhury and Sajid Dhanani.

== History ==
Prosenjit Choudhury was, at the time, a culinary expert at Sayaji Hotels. While working at the hotel, he introduced the concept of live grills similar to Korean barbecue in order to enhance the buffet experience to avoid cold appetisers. This idea proved to be popular and with the support of Sajid Dhanani, the managing director of Sayaji Hotels, Choudhury established the first outlet at Pali Hill in Mumbai, India in 2006. The brand had expanded to cities such as New Delhi and Bengaluru by 2008. After Sajid Dhanani's death in 2012, his brother Kayum Dhanani took over the business. The company opened its 100th outlet in 2018.

The company offered its IPO in 2021. The IPO raised ₹453 crore (US$52 million), with ₹180 crore as fresh capital for expansion and debt repayment, and ₹273 crore as an offer for sale by existing investors. The stock was reported to perform poorly, due to factors such as the COVID-19 pandemic's impact on the restaurant market, weakening sales and increased competition. An Indian Express article highlighted how the buffet business was stalling due to new customer trends, affecting the growth of Barbeque Nation.

As of 2022, the company owns an 86.57% stake in Red Apple Kitchen Consultancy Private Limited, which manages an Italian restaurant chain, Toscano.

== Menu ==
=== Barbeque Nation ===
The menu differs from region to region, but all restaurants feature a mix of Indian cuisine with the local dishes. Reviews mention the availability of vegetarian options in the restaurant. Barbeque Nation also operates Kulfi Nation within their restaurants that features combinations of kulfi flavours, toppings, and sauces.

=== Toscano ===
Toscano is an Italian restaurant. It features items such as pasta, pizza, steak, and coffee.

== Locations ==
The company currently has around 200 restaurants, including four in the UAE, and one in Malaysia, Kenya, Bahrain and Oman as of 2026.
