= Salem bypass =

Road in India

Salem Bypass Road
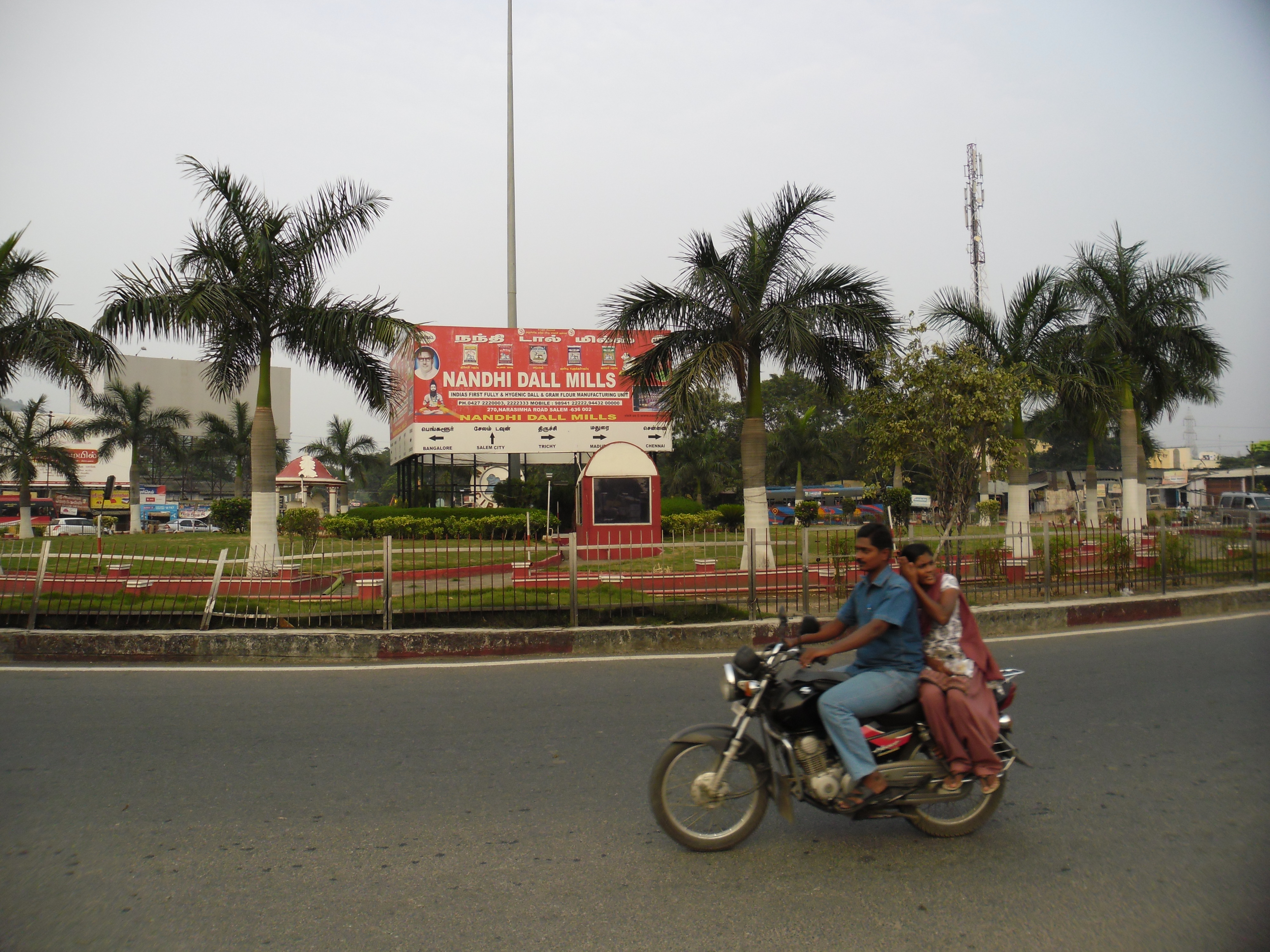
- Salem Bypass road connecting 3 National Highways

Route information
- Maintained by National Highways Authority of India, Salem City Municipal Corporation, Highways and Minor Ports Department
- Length: 15 km (9.3 mi)

Major junctions
- From: Ammapet, Salem
- To: Kandhampatti, Salem

Location
- Country: India
- Major cities: Kumaragiri, Seelanaickenpatti, Kondalampatti

Highway system
- Roads in India; Expressways; National; State; Asian

The Salem Bypass are a series of bypasses connecting the various National Highways and State Highways passing through and originating in the South Indian city of Salem.

Existing Salem bypass connects three major National Highways that originates and passing through Salem city. It connects Salem - Ulundurpet (NH 79), Salem - Kochi (NH 544), Salem - Vaniyambadi (NH 179 A) and Srinagar - Kanyakumari (NH 44).

== Ammapet bypass ==
Ammapet bypass is 1.6 km stretch of Salem bypass in Salem city which connects Salem - Tirupattur - Vaniyambadi (NH 179 A) with Salem - Ulundurpet (NH 79).

== Kondalampatti - Kandhampatti ==
Kondalampatti - Kandhampatti is 13.4 km stretch of Salem bypass. Seelanaickenpatti, Kondalampatti & Kandhampatti are major junctions in this bypass. Connecting, NH-44, NH-544 & NH-79.

== Trumpet Exchange ==
Salem trumpet exchange also known as Butterfly Flyover ease traffic flow for in and out in Salem - Coimbatore, Salem - Attur and Salem - Bengaluru directions.

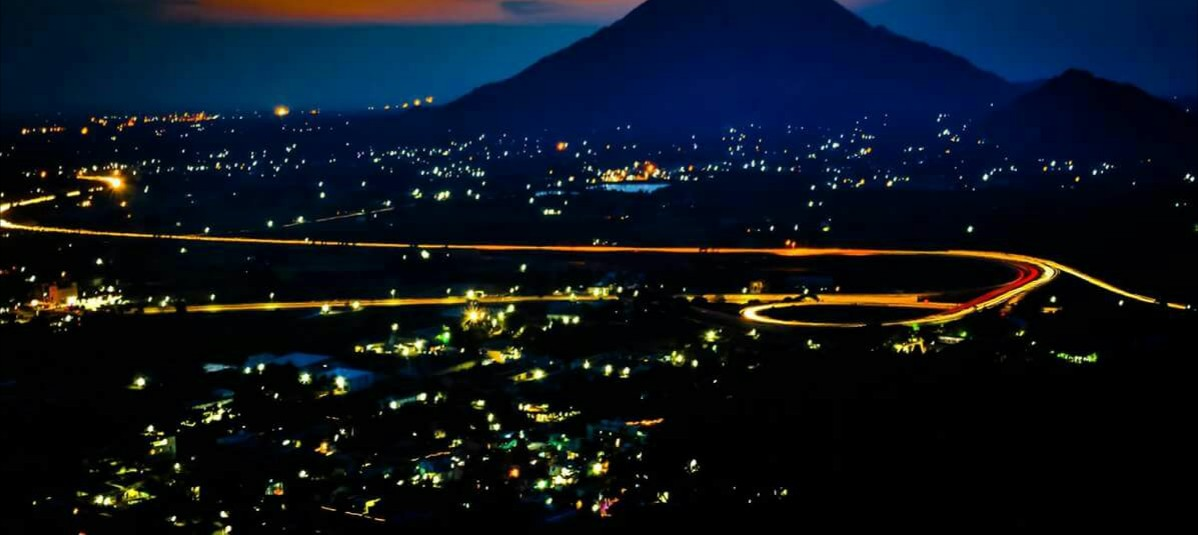
Night view of Trumpet exchange

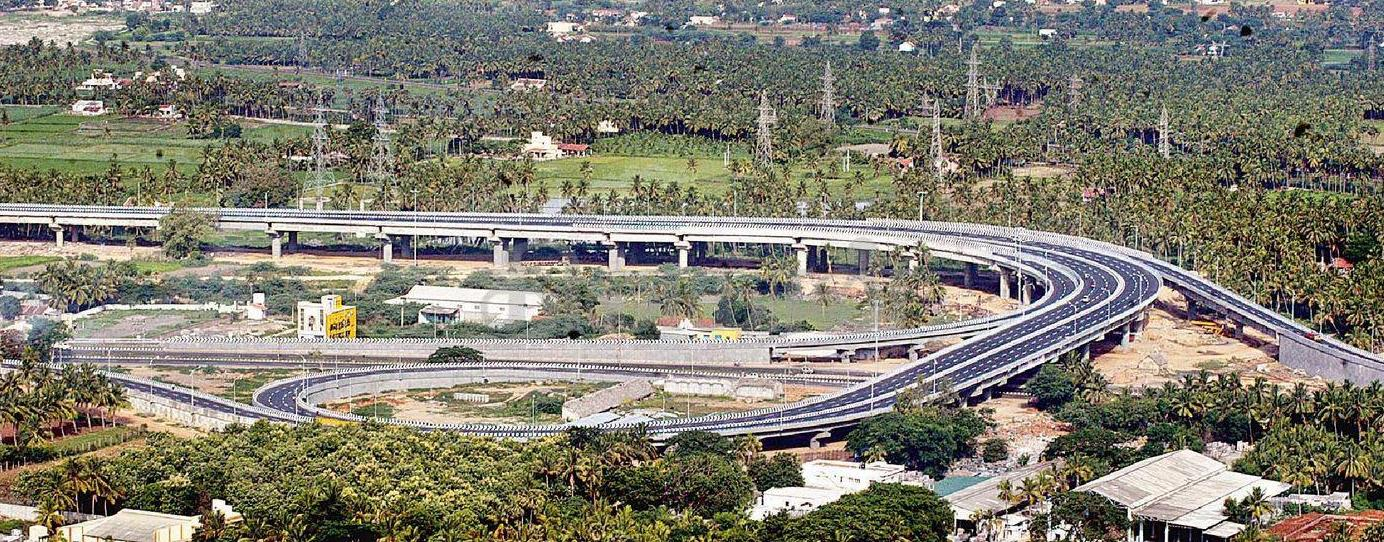
Salem Trumpet exchange

== Western bypass ==
National Highway Authority of India is currently working on Western bypass for Salem. DPR preparation and alignment works are underway, NHAI stated in RTI recently.
