= PSG College of Arts and Science =

College in Coimbatore, Tamil Nadu, India

- Motto in English: Knowledge, Love and Work
- Type: Private (Government Aided)
- Established: 1947; 79 years ago
- Affiliations: Bharathiar University
- Location: Coimbatore, Tamil Nadu, India; 11°1′57.36″N 77°2′4.43″E
- Campus: Urban
- Website: www.psgcas.ac.in

PSG College of Arts and Science (PSG CAS) is a college of arts and sciences in Coimbatore, Tamil Nadu, India. It was founded in 1947 by G. R. Damodaran. It was ranked 11th among colleges in India by the National Institutional Ranking Framework (NIRF) in 2024.

== History ==
PSG College of Arts and Science was started in 1947 by the PSG and Sons Charities which was founded in 1926 by the four sons of P.S. Govindasamy Naidu. The college was affiliated to Madras University till 1978. College Principal is Mehlam Rangwala. The college became autonomous and affiliated to Bharathiar University since 1978. It is one of the first Arts and Science colleges in Tamil Nadu to get the autonomous status. The college was identified as a College with Potential for Excellence by University Grants Commission (India) in October 2005. It is one among 47 colleges in the country, 8 in the State and the only one in Bharathiar University. The college has been accredited at the 2.5 star level by National Assessment and Accreditation Council (NAAC) and became an ISO 9001: 1994 certified institution in 2001 and subsequently an ISO 9001: 2000 certified institution since 2003.

== Courses ==
This institute offers 43 Undergraduate Programmes, 4 BVoc Programmes, 27 Postgraduate Programmes, 1 Five year Integrated Postgraduate Programme, 3 PG Diploma Programmes, M.Phil and Ph.D Programmes are offered in 25 Disciplines.

The college has a separate faculty of commerce, with a separate block named as "School of Commerce" with a total area of 2.75 lakh sq.ft. It has 85 classrooms, four computer laboratories, and two conference halls. Other than that there are 10 blocks with specific departments, GRD Auditorium, Library hall, three conference hall, Indoor Basketball, Volleyball, Badminton stadium is available and there is a full athlete track ground. Football, Cricket, tennis and Hockey ground is also on the premises. Block A covers students of four departments and they are Visual Communication, Psychology, Statistics and Hospitality.

== Library ==
The Library built up area is 24,500 sq.ft. with the seating capacity for about 400 readers. It is well stocked and presently has a collection of over 120,000 volumes on different subjects. Latest publications in the fields of Life Sciences, Physical Sciences, Chemical Sciences, Business Studies, Economics, Humanities and Social Sciences are continuously added to the collection to equip the student with a wide range of academic materials. The Library also subscribes about 225 journals of national and international repute. All Prominent national dailies are also subscribed in the library. The College Library is fully automated and provides user services through the computer. Library also has Wi-Fi facility.

== Campus life ==
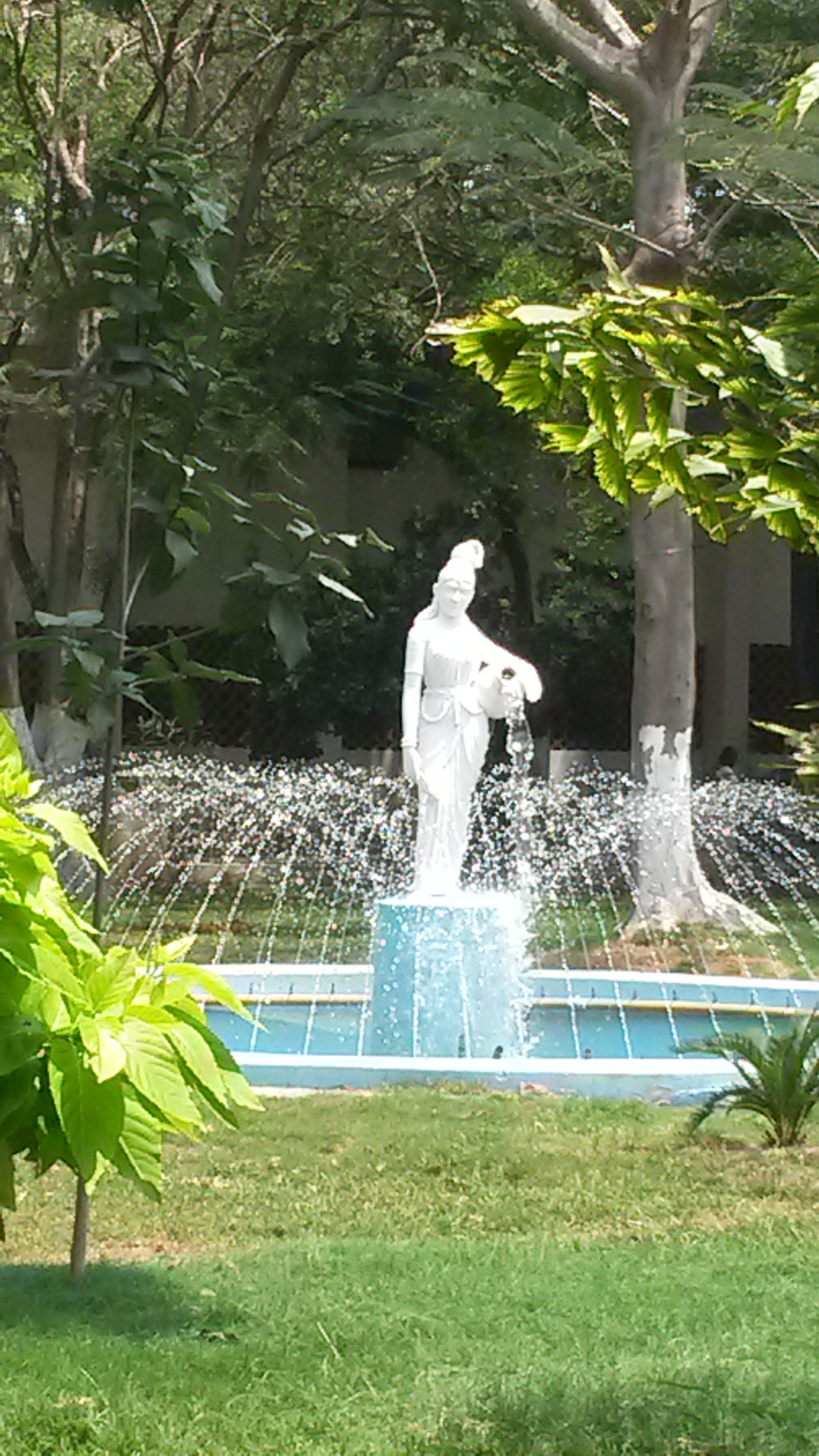
Fountain in the PSG College of Arts and Science

Wizards and Heartbeat are the annual inter-departmental cultural competitions and Cascall and Euphoria are the annual inter-college cultural competitions. Other festivals include "Gateway", state-level inter-collegiate technical festival by Department of Computer Science. Department of Visual Communication organizes a short film festival, "Pathivugal". Phoenix and LitZeal are the annual inter college literary fests,"Blizzard" inter collegiate BPS fest by Department of Commerce with Business Process Service. Apart from these, other departments in the college also organize festivals and conferences.

PSGCAS has various associations such as Mathematics Association, Physics Association, and Chemistry Association organize subject-related competitions and student-run clubs such as Rotaract club, Innopreneurs Club (Innovation + Entrepreneurship), Casétune(Music Club), Drama Club, Eco Club, Face Club, Women's forum, Thinkers Club, Citizen Consumer Club, and Nilamutram.

There are many food joints inside the college. Cafe Coffee Day has a permanent stall. Campus cafe and "front canteen" are the snacks joint. There is a "back canteen" which serves food apart from the hostel mess. There are two stationery stores and a book depot inside the college. Naturals beauty salon is also on the campus. Many shops are available in The South India Textile Research Association (SITRA) area which is just a two-minute walk from the college.

Student elections happen at the first or third week of June to elect the office members of Manavar Mandram (Students union). Students elect Secretary and Chairman from second year and third year respectively. The students who wish to file nominations for elections should have 60% and no backlogs.

== Notable alumni ==
The alumni of this college are called CASians. Notable alumni include:

- Farhaan Faasil, Actor
- Ravindranath Kumar, Politician
- Adam Sinclair, Field Hockey Player
- George Thengummoottil, documentary filmmaker
- Sathyan, Actor
- Jose K. Mani, Politician
- K. A. Manoharan, Politician
- Semmalar Annam, Actress
- Naadodigal Gopal, Actor
- Lokesh Kanagaraj, Director-Screenwriter
- Hanumankind, Musician-Rapper
- Nizhalgal Ravi, Actor
- C. Mahendran, Politician
