= Coimbatore District Small Industries Association =

Indian trade organization

Coimbatore District Small Industries Association கோயம்புத்தூர் மாவட்ட சிறு தொழிலார்கள் சங்கம்
- Abbreviation: CODISSIA
- Formation: 1969
- Type: trade organization
- Headquarters: Coimbatore, India
- President: M. KarthiKeyan
- Website: www.codissia.com

Coimbatore District Small Scale Industries Association (CODISSIA) (Tamil:கோயம்புத்தூர் மாவட்ட சிறு தொழிலார்கள் சங்கம்) is an Indian trade organization based in Coimbatore, Tamil Nadu. It is affiliated to Tamil Nadu Small and Tiny Industries Association (TANSTIA). It is the largest district association of small industries in India with more than two thousand members. The organization plays a major role in the development of industries in the region and also helps industries with government rules and norms. CODISSIA has pushed for the establishment of more public sector units in Coimbatore.

== History ==
CODISSIA was established in 1969 with 40 members under the Tamil Nadu Societies Registration Act. In 1972, the organization participated in trade fair at Delhi. CODISSIA organized its first vendor exhibition in association with Integral Coach Factory, Chennai. In 1973, CODISSIA bulletin, a fortnightly journal was started. In 1974, P. C. Alexander, then Development Commissioner (SSI), the Government of India inaugurated an exhibition of railway and telecommunication parts conducted by CODISSIA.

== CODISSIA complex ==
CODISSIA Trade Fair Complex is an industrial and exhibition venue in Coimbatore run by CODISSIA. It was constructed in a record time of 155 days in 1999 and has been certified as a World Record holder in the Limca Book of Records as having Asia’s largest pillar free hall. The complex regularly hosts trade fairs and industrial exhibitions. The organization plans to establish an industrial estate on the outskirts of Coimbatore. CODISSIA has signed an agreement with the Government of Tamil Nadu during the Global Investors 2015 to establish two industrial parks in Coimbatore.

== Exhibitions and trade fairs ==
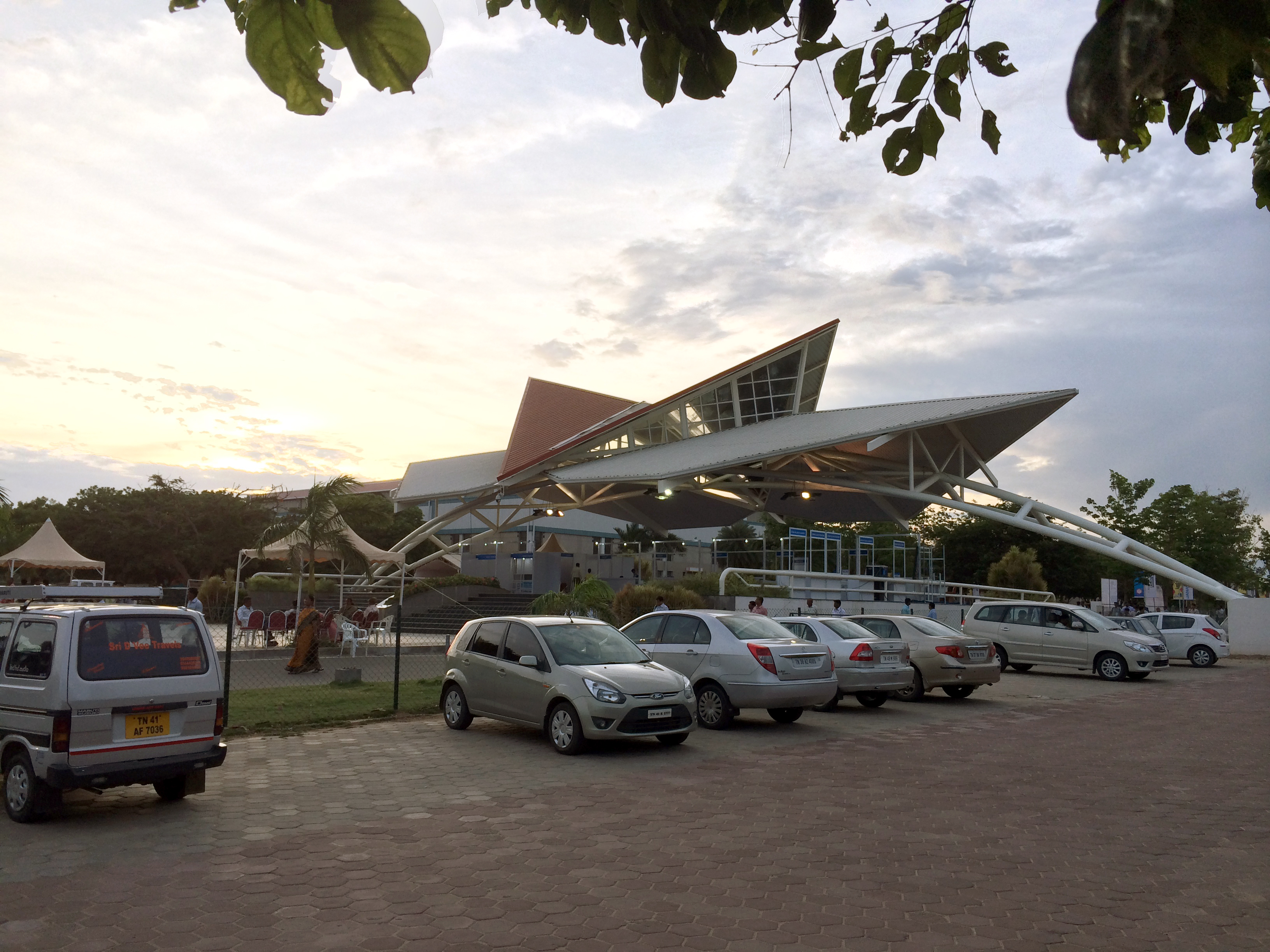
CODISSIA Trade Fair Comples, Coimbatore 2014

CODISSIA organizes Agri Intex, an annual agricultural trade fair to promote agriculture and allied industries. The 21st edition was organized in 2023 which included participants from over 10 countries. INTEC is an industrial trade fair organized every year since 1999. SubCon and BuildTech are other fairs that are organized by CODISSIA. It has also organized a renewable energy fair Elektrotec since 2014 for promoting products related to renewable energy production.
