= Avinashi Road flyover =

Flyover in Coimbatore

Avinashi road flyover Roundana
- அவினாசி ரோடு மேம்பாலம் Roundana
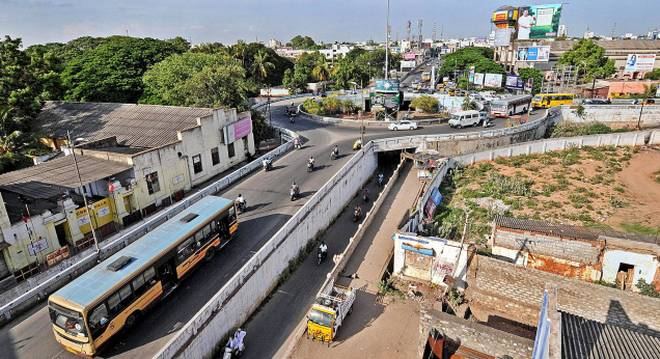

Location
- Coimbatore, India
- Coordinates: 11.001349°N 76.962855°E
- Roads at junction: Avinashi road Goods shed road Brook bond road Mill road

Construction
- Type: Roundabout interchange
- Spans: 5
- Lanes: 2
- Opened: 1974

Avinashi road Flyover or Roundana is a roundabout flyover in Coimbatore that connects the Northern and Eastern areas with other parts of the city. It is built across the railway line connecting Coimbatore's main junction. The flyover forms one end of Avinashi Road. It is one of the most important interchanges in Coimbatore and is crucial to carry traffic from each side of the railway line that cuts through the city.

== History ==
The flyover was built in 1974 and was the second flyover to be opened in Tamil Nadu after the Anna flyover. It was also the first grade separator in India to have a roundabout. The flyover was built due to traffic congestion caused by the railway crossing near the junction. The flyover connects the Northern and Eastern areas with other parts of the city. Though the flyover helped in reducing congestion, flaws in the bridge require modifications. No pedestrian corridor is available. Modifications have been suggested to improve the situation. The bridge lacks maintenance leaving the structure weakened.

== Location ==
The flyover is located near the railway station. The flyover connects Avinashi road, Brook Bond road, Mill road and Goods shed road.

== Gallery ==
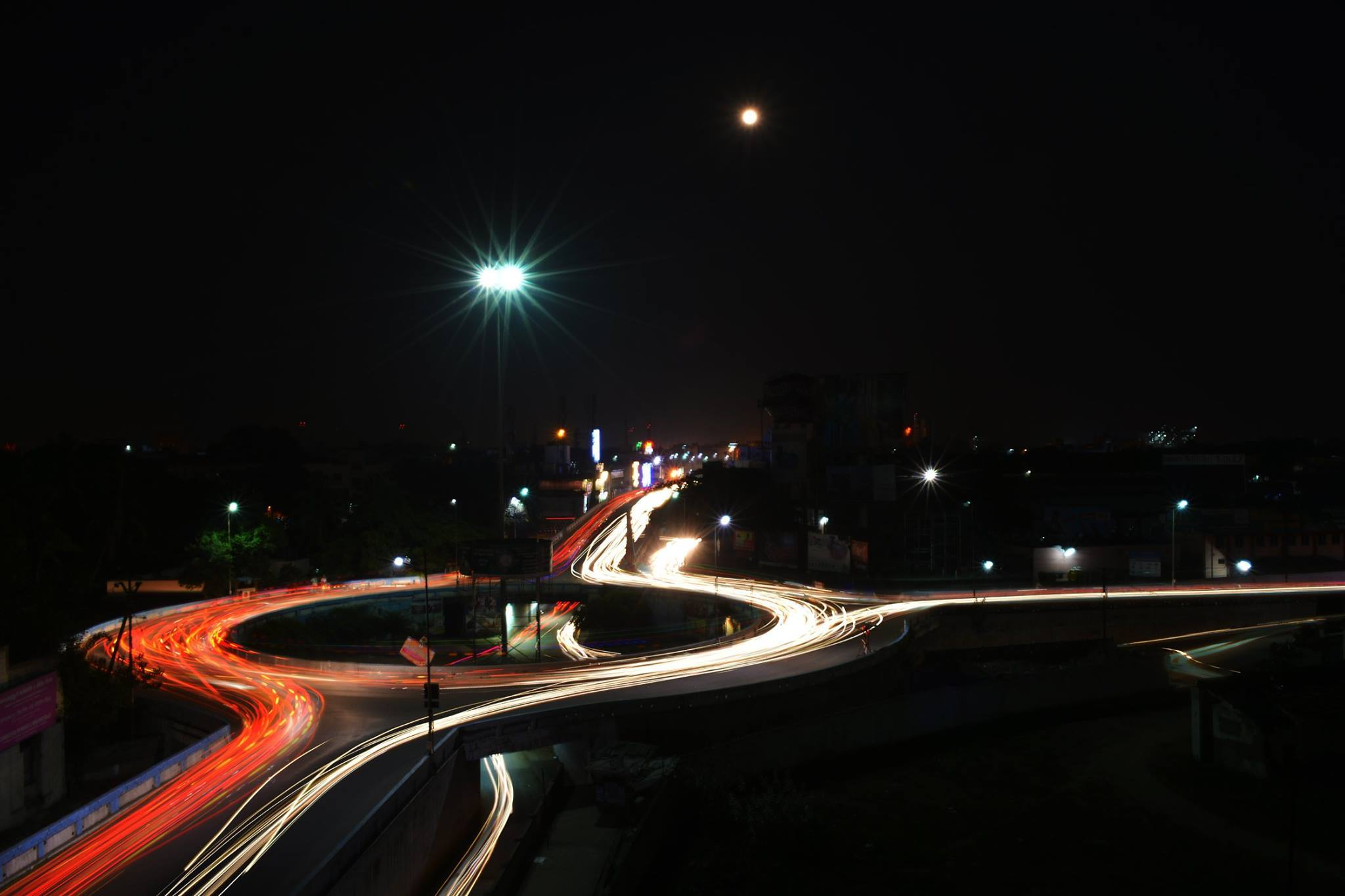

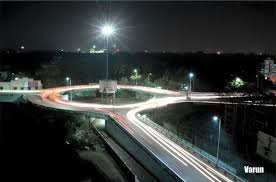

== See also ==
- Flyovers in Coimbatore
