= List of schools in India =

This is a list of schools in India grouped by state/UT. Where a state or city has its own list, it is linked without duplicating the names here.
There are more than 1.5 million schools in India, so this list only includes those with Wikipedia articles.

== Andhra Pradesh ==
=== Guntur ===
- Loyola Public School, Nallapadu
- Sri Venkateswara Bala Kuteer - Brodipet, Chowdavaram and Syamala Nagar

=== Vijayawada ===
- Delhi Public School
- NSM Public School
- Satavahana College

=== Vishakapatnam ===
- Sri TVS Rao Srikrishna Vidya Mandir, Dwaraka Nagar
- St Aloysius' Anglo-Indian High School, One Town
- Timpany School, Asilmetta
- Visakha Valley School, Hanumanthavaka

=== Other locations ===
- Andhra Pradesh Residential School, Parigi Mandal
- Ashram Public School, Kakinada
- Candor National Public School, Tirupati
- Little Flower School, Mudinepalli
- The Peepal Grove School, Gongivaripalli
- Rishi Valley School, Madanapalle
- Sainik School, Korukonda
- The Government High School for Boys, Rajamahendravaram
- Venkatagiri Raja High School, Nellore

== Arunachal Pradesh ==
- Government Secondary School, Rani Village
- Independent Golden Jubilee Government Higher Secondary School, Pasighat

== Assam ==
=== Golaghat ===
- Golaghat Government Bezbaruah Higher Secondary School
- Vivekananda Kendra Vidyalaya Golaghat

=== Guwahati ===
- Cotton Collegiate Government H.S. School
- Don Bosco High School
- St. Mary's English High School
- Tarini Choudhury Govt. Girls H.S. & M.P. School

=== Jorhat ===
- Dipankar Vidyapith
- Don Bosco Higher Secondary School
- Pragya Academy

=== Other locations ===
- Army Public School, Narengi
- The Assam Valley School, Balipara
- Dibrugarh Govt. Boys' Higher Secondary School, Dibrugarh
- Rangia Higher Secondary School, Rangiya
- Sainik School, Goalpara
- Salbari Higher Secondary School, Salbari

== Bihar ==
=== Darbhanga ===
- Darbhanga Public School

=== Other locations ===
- Kendriya Vidyalaya, Maharajganj
- Nazareth Academy, Old Karimganj
- Paradise Public School, Aurangabad
- Sainik School, Gopalganj
- St. Xavier's Higher Secondary School, Bettiah
- Sundari Devi Saraswati Vidya Mandir, Samastipur
- Watson High School, Madhubani
- Zila School Chapra, Chapra

== Chandigarh ==
- Chandigarh Baptist School
- Mount Carmel School
- St. Anne's Convent School, Chandigarh
- St. John's High School
- St. Stephen's School, Chandigarh
- Strawberry Fields High School
- Vatika High School for Deaf & Dumb

== Chhattisgarh ==
- Natwar High School, Raigarh
- Rajkumar College, Raipur
- Sainik School, Ambikapur

== Goa ==
- Goa Vidyaprasarak Mandal
- Jawahar Navodaya Vidyalaya, Canacona
- Jawahar Navodaya Vidyalaya, Valpoi
- Kendriya Vidyalaya Bambolim, Bambolim
- Loyola High School, Margao
- Mount Mary's Higher Secondary School, Chinchinim
- Mushtifund Saunstha, Panaji
- Regina Martyrum High School, Assolna
- Saraswat Vidyalaya, Khorlim
- Sharada Mandir School, Miramar
- St. Britto High School, Mapusa
- St. Francis Xavier's High School, Siolim
- St. Mary's Convent High School, Mapusa
- St. Xavier's High School, Velim

== Gujarat ==
=== Ahmedabad ===
- Delhi Public School, Bopal
- H. B. Kapadia New High School
- I P Mission School, Raikhad
- RB Ranchhodlal Chhotalal Girls High School
- RC Commercial High School
- St. Xavier's High School
- St. Xavier's High School Loyola Hall, Naranpura
- Sheth Chimanlal Nagindas Vidyalaya, Ambawadi
- Udgam School For Children, Thaltej

=== Surat ===
- Ashadeep Group of Schools
- St. Xavier's High School, Ghod Dod Road

=== Other locations ===
- Alfred High School, Bhuj
- Arya Kanya Gurukul, Porbandar
- H. B. Kapadia New High School, Gandhinagar
- Rajkumar College, Rajkot
- Sainik School, Jamnagar
- TMS Jogani High School, Khimat
- St. Xavier's High School, Gandhinagar

== Haryana ==
=== Jagadhri ===
- Sacred Heart School
- S.D. Public School

=== Karnal ===
- St. Theresa's Convent Sr. Sec. School
- Tagore Baal Niketan Senior Secondary School

=== Other locations ===
- Gita Niketan Awasiya Vidyalaya, Kurukshetra
- Government School, Bidhwan
- Government Senior Secondary School, Nilokheri
- Hardayal Public School, Bahadurgarh
- Kendriya Vidyalaya, Rohtak
- Motilal Nehru School of Sports, Rai
- Sainik School, Kunjpura
- Sainik School, Gothra Tappa Khori

== Himachal Pradesh ==
=== Dharamsala ===
- International Sahaja Public School
- Kunpan Cultural School
- Sherab Gatsel Lobling School

=== Shimla ===
- Auckland House School
- Bishop Cotton School
- Chail Military School
- Convent of Jesus and Mary
- Loreto Convent, Tara Hall
- S.D. Senior Secondary School
- St. Edward's School

=== Other locations ===
- Alpine Public School, Nalagarh
- Army Public School, Dagshai
- Dalhousie Hilltop School, Dalhousie
- The Lawrence School, Kasauli
- Sainik School, Tira Sujanpur

== Jammu and Kashmir ==
=== Jammu ===
- BSF Secondary School
- Delhi Public School
- Government Sri Ranbir Model Higher Secondary School
- St. Peter's High School

=== Srinagar ===
- Burn Hall School
- Delhi Public School
- Green Valley Educational Institute
- Lal Ded Memorial School
- Little Angels High School
- Mallinson Girls School
- Presentation Convent Higher Secondary School
- Sri Pratap Higher Secondary School
- Tiny Harts School
- Tyndale Biscoe School, Srinagar

=== Other locations ===
- Government Degree College, Sopore
- Haji Public School, Breswana
- Kendriya Vidyalaya, Bantalab
- Sainik School, Manasbal Lake
- Shaheen Public Secondary School, Handwara
- St. Joseph's Higher Secondary School, Baramulla

== Karnataka ==
=== Belgaum ===
- B K Model High School,
- Belgaum Military School
- St. Mary's School
- St. Paul's High School

=== Mangaluru ===
- Basel Evangelical School
- Cambridge School
- Canara High School, Kodialbail
- Carmel School, Pandeshwar
- Lourdes Central School, Bejai
- Milagres School, Hampankatta
- Mount Carmel Central School, Maryhill
- Rosario High School, Pandeshwar
- Sacred Hearts' School, Kulshekar
- St. Gerosa High School, Jeppu
- St. Theresa's School, Bendur
- Vidyadayanee High School, Surathkal
- The Yenepoya School

=== Mysuru ===
- Demonstration School, Manasagangotri
- Hardwick High School and College, Chamarajapuram
- Kaliyuva Mane School
- Kautilya Vidyalaya
- Marimallappa High School
- Pramati Hillview Academy, Kuvempunagar
- Sadvidya Pathashala
- Sri Ramakrishna Vidyashala
- Vidya Vardhaka Sangha High School

=== Uttara Kannada ===
- Al Hilal English School, Manki
- Gibb High School, Kumta
- Jai Hind High School, Ankola
- Kendriya Vidyalaya Karwar, Karwar
- Shri Marikamba High School, Sirsi

=== Other locations ===
- Church Higher Primary School, Belthangady
- Kendriya Vidyalaya, Hubli
- KGF School, Kolar Gold Fields
- Nutan Vidyalaya Education Society, Kalaburagi
- Rotary English Medium School, Ranebennuru
- Sneha Shikshana Samsthe Sullia, Sullia

== Kerala ==
=== Alappuzha ===
- Bishop Hodges Higher Secondary School, Mavelikkara
- Kendriya Vidyalaya, Cheppad
- Sri Adwayananda Public School, Malakkara

=== Idukki ===
- St. Augustine's Higher Secondary School, Karimkunnam
- St. George Higher Secondary School, Kattappana

=== Kottayam ===
- Baker Memorial Girls High School
- John Joseph Murphy Memorial Higher Secondary School, Yendayar
- Labour India Gurukulam Public School, Marangattupilly
- Lourdes Public School and Junior College
- Pallikoodam, Kalathilpady
- St. Berchmans Higher Secondary School, Changanassery

=== Kozhikode ===
- G.U.P.S, Padinhattummuri, Kizhakkummuri
- Peace International School
- St. Joseph's Boys' Higher Secondary School
- Silver Hills School

=== Malappuram ===
- Al Huda Central School, Kadampuzha
- Government Vocational Higher Secondary School, Kalpakanchery
- PKMM Higher Secondary School, Edarikode

=== Palakkad ===
- BSS Gurukulam Higher Secondary School, Alathur
- Kendriya Vidyalaya, Kanjikode
- Railway High School
- Sarang School, Agali

=== Thrissur ===
- Bhavan's Vidya Mandir, Poochatty
- Carmel Higher Secondary School, Chalakudy
- Church Mission Society Higher Secondary School
- Devamatha CMI Public School, Patturaikkal
- Government Model Higher Secondary School for Boys, Chembukkavu
- Hari Sri Vidya Nidhi School, Punkunnam
- Little Flower Convent Higher Secondary School, Irinjalakuda
- SNHSS, Irinjalakuda
- Vailoppilli Sreedhara Menon Memorial Government Vocational Higher Secondary School, Ollur
- Vivekodayam Boys Higher Secondary School

=== Wayanad ===
- Meenangadi Government Higher Secondary School, Meenangadi
- WMO English Academy, Kalpetta

== Madhya Pradesh ==
- Army Public School, Bhopal
- Campion School, Bhopal
- Christ Church Boys' Senior Secondary School, Jabalpur
- Daly College, Indore
- Delhi Public School, Bhopal
- Model Higher Secondary School, TT Nagar
- Prestige Public School, Indore
- Sainik School, Rewa
- St. Aloysius Senior Secondary School, Jabalpur
- St. Joseph's Convent Girls' Senior Secondary School, Jabalpur
- St. Raphael's Girls' Higher Secondary School, Indore
- Scindia Kanya Vidyalaya, Gwalior
- Scindia School, Gwalior
- Vikram Higher Secondary School, Piplani

== Manipur ==
- Don Bosco High School, Chingmeirong
- Johnstone Higher Secondary School, Imphal
- Little Flower School, Imphal
- Sainik School, Imphal
- St. Joseph's School, Sangaiparou

== Meghalaya ==
- Christian Girls' Higher Secondary School, Tura
- Don Bosco Technical School, Shillong
- St. Anthony's Higher Secondary School, Shillong
- St. Edmund's College, Shillong

== Mizoram ==
- Bethel Mission School, Champhai

== Pondicherry ==
- Jawahar Navodaya Vidyalaya, Kalapet
- Lycée français de Pondichéry, Pondicherry
- Petit Seminaire Higher Secondary School, Pondicherry

== Punjab ==
- The British Co-Ed High School, Patiala
- Christ Jyoti Convent School, Sultanpur Lodhi
- Dasmesh Public School, Faridkot
- Guru Amar Das Public School, Jalandhar
- Kitchlu Public School, Moga
- Kundan Vidya Mandir, Ludhiana
- Our Lady Of Fatima Convent Secondary School, Patiala
- Parkash Memorial Deaf & Dumb School, Rupnagar
- Patiala School for the Blind, Patiala
- Patiala School for the Deaf, Patiala
- Patiala School for the Deaf-blind, Patiala
- Sainik School, Kapurthala

== Sikkim ==
- Government Senior Secondary School, Central Pendam
- Taktse International School, Penlong
- Tashi Namgyal Academy, Gangtok

== Telangana ==
=== Other locations ===
- Jawahar Navodaya Vidyalaya Medak
- Kakatiya High School, Nizamabad
- St. Gabriel's High School, Kazipet
- St. Joseph's Convent High School, Adilabad
- Telangana State Sports School, Hakimpet

== Tripura ==
- Netaji Subhash Vidyaniketan, Agartala
- Umakanta Academy, Agartala

== Uttar Pradesh ==
=== Agra ===
- St. George's College
- St. Peter's College

=== Aligarh ===
- Our Lady of Fatima Senior Secondary School
- STS School

=== Ayodhya ===
- Government Inter College Faizabad
- RMLU School

=== Bareilly ===
- F.R. Islamia Inter College
- Shri Gulab Rai Group of Institutions

=== Kanpur ===
- BNSD Inter College
- Delhi Public School, Azad Nagar
- Delhi Public School, Kalyanpur
- DPS Barra
- Methodist High School
- Ramakrishna Mission Ashrama

=== Lucknow ===
- Bal Vidya Mandir
- City Montessori School, multiple locations
- La Martinière College, Lucknow
- Loreto Convent
- Modern School
- Prerna Girls School
- Seth Anandram Jaipuria School Lucknow
- St. Agnes' Loreto Day School
- St. Francis' College

=== Meerut ===
- City Vocational Public School
- St. Mary's Academy, Meerut Cantt.
- Vardhman Academy

=== Noida ===
- Delhi Public School
- Greater Valley School
- Prometheus School

=== Prayagraj ===
- Boys' High School & College
- Kendriya Vidyalaya New Cantt
- St. Joseph's College
- St. Mary's Convent Inter College
- Shiv Ganga Vidya Mandir

=== Raebareli ===
- Kendriya Vidyalaya
- Swami Janki Sharan

=== Varanasi ===
- Central Hindu Boys School
- Central Hindu Girls School
- Central Hindu School
- C.M. Anglo Bengali College
- Prabhu Narayan Government Inter College
- Rajghat Besant School
- Sri Ranveer Sanskrit Vidyalaya

=== Other locations ===
- Al-Qadeer Higher Secondary School, Sambhal
- Army Public School, Gorakhpur
- Government Inter College, Deoria
- Government Inter College Barabanki, Barabanki
- Hartmann College, Izzatnagar
- Ingraham Institute, Ghaziabad
- Kendriya Vidyalaya, Mughalsarai
- New R. S. J. Public School, Jhusi

== Uttarakhand ==
=== Dehradun ===
- The Aryan School
- The Asian School
- Brightlands School
- Cambrian Hall
- Colonel Brown Cambridge School
- The Doon School
- Ecole Globale International Girls' School
- Marshall School
- Rashtriya Indian Military College
- SelaQui International School
- St. Joseph's Academy
- St. Thomas' College
- Unison World School
- Welham Boys' School
- Welham Girls' School

=== Mussoorie ===
- Convent of Jesus and Mary
- Guru Nanak Fifth Centenary School
- Oak Grove School
- St. George's College
- Wynberg Allen School

=== Nainital ===
- Birla Vidya Mandir
- St. Joseph's College
- St. Mary's Convent High School
- Sherwood College

=== Other locations ===
- Sainik School, Ghorakhal
- Woodstock School, Landour

== National chains ==
- Atomic Energy Central School, established in 1969
- Bharatiya Vidya Bhavan, established in 1938
- Carmel Convent School
- Chinmaya Vidyalaya, established in 1965
- Delhi Public School, established in 1949
- Indian Army Public Schools, established in 1983
- Jawahar Navodaya Vidyalaya, established in 1986
- Padma Seshadri Bala Bhavan, established in 1958
- Podar Group of Schools, established 1927
- Railway schools in India, established in 1873
- Ramakrishna Mission Schools, established in 1922
- Ryan International Schools, established in 1976
- Sainik Schools, established in 1961
- Seth M.R. Jaipuria Schools, established in 1992
- Sri Chaitanya Educational Institutions, established in 1986
- VIBGYOR Group of Schools, established in 2004
- Vidya Bharati, established in 1952
- Vignan Schools, established in 1982
- Vivekananda Vidyalaya, established in 1972
- Vivekananda Kendra Vidyalaya, established in 1977

== See also ==
- Education in India
- List of boarding schools in India
- List of international schools in India
- List of Jesuit secondary schools in India
