= SSVM =

SSVM may refer to:

- Servants of the Lord and the Virgin of Matará, the female branch of the Institute of the Incarnate Word, a Catholic religious order
- Sundari Devi Saraswati Vidya Mandir, a residential school in India
- Structured support vector machine, a type of support vector machine
