= I P Mission School =

Irish Presbyterian Mission School
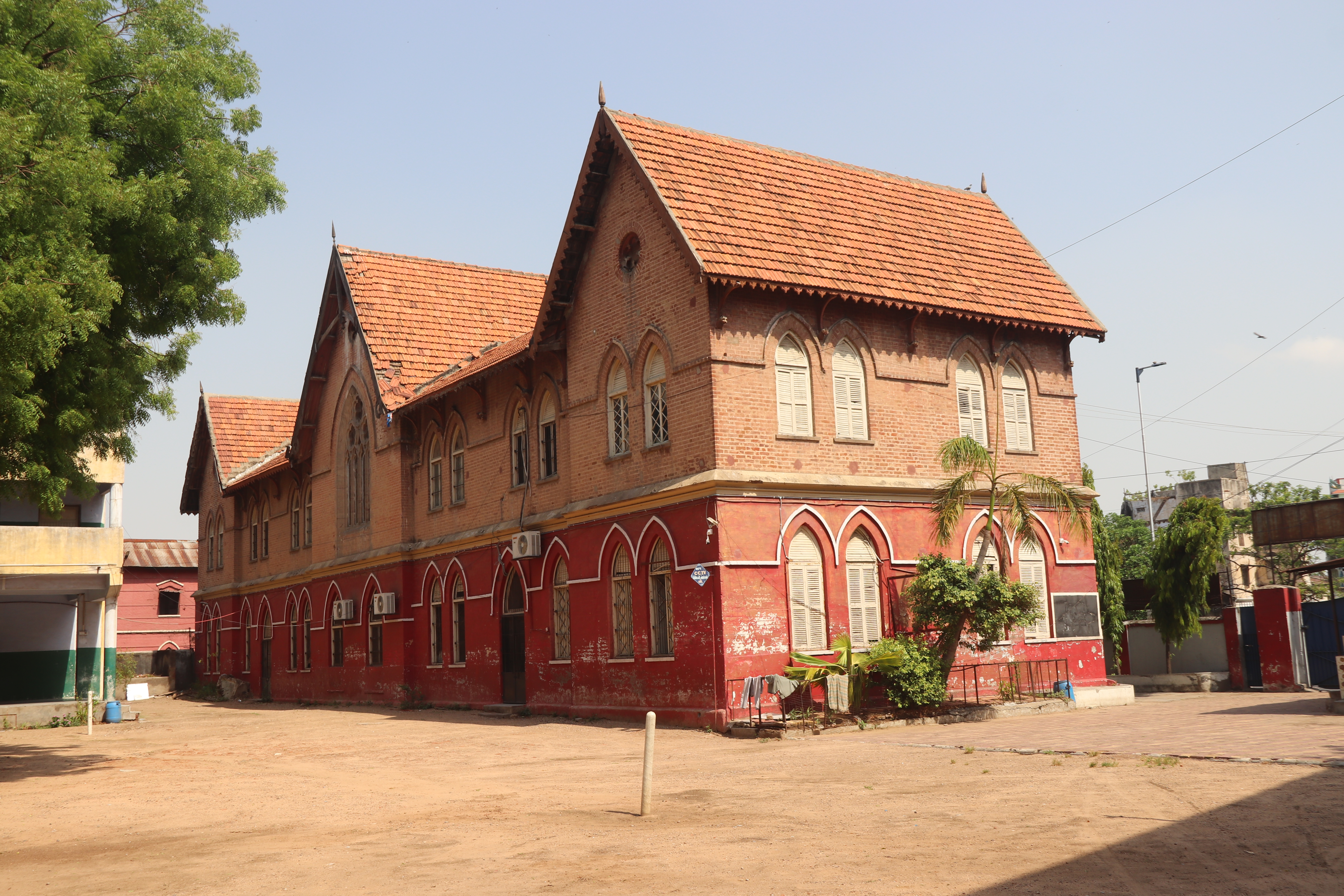
- Old school building from northwest

Location
- Raikhad, Ahmedabad; India; 23.022066°N 72.581383°E

Information
- Opened: June 1866
- School district: Gujarat Christian Service Society
- Principal: JD Kalaswa

The Irish Presbyterian Mission high school, abbreviated as I P Mission School, is a school in Ahmedabad. Established in 1866 by the Irish Presbyterian Mission, it grew over the years in the major educational institutions group.

== History ==
The Irish Presbyterian Mission high school was opened in June 1866 at the cost of the Presbyterian church in Ireland, the contributions amounting to £114 (Rs. 1140). It was first opened in Shahibaug and later shifted to new building near Ellis Bridge. In the beginning there were 34 students; by 1879 there were 201 students. Today it serves more than 11,000 students and professionals across Gujarat.

== School building ==
The school building was one of the first modern structural construction was supervised by Himmatlal Dhirajram Bhachech who also constructed the Ellis Bridge. It was built of red bricks in European style building with Gothic windows. It featured open air corridors, arched verandas, sloping roofs with tiles and classrooms with high ceilings for better ventilation.

== Gallery ==
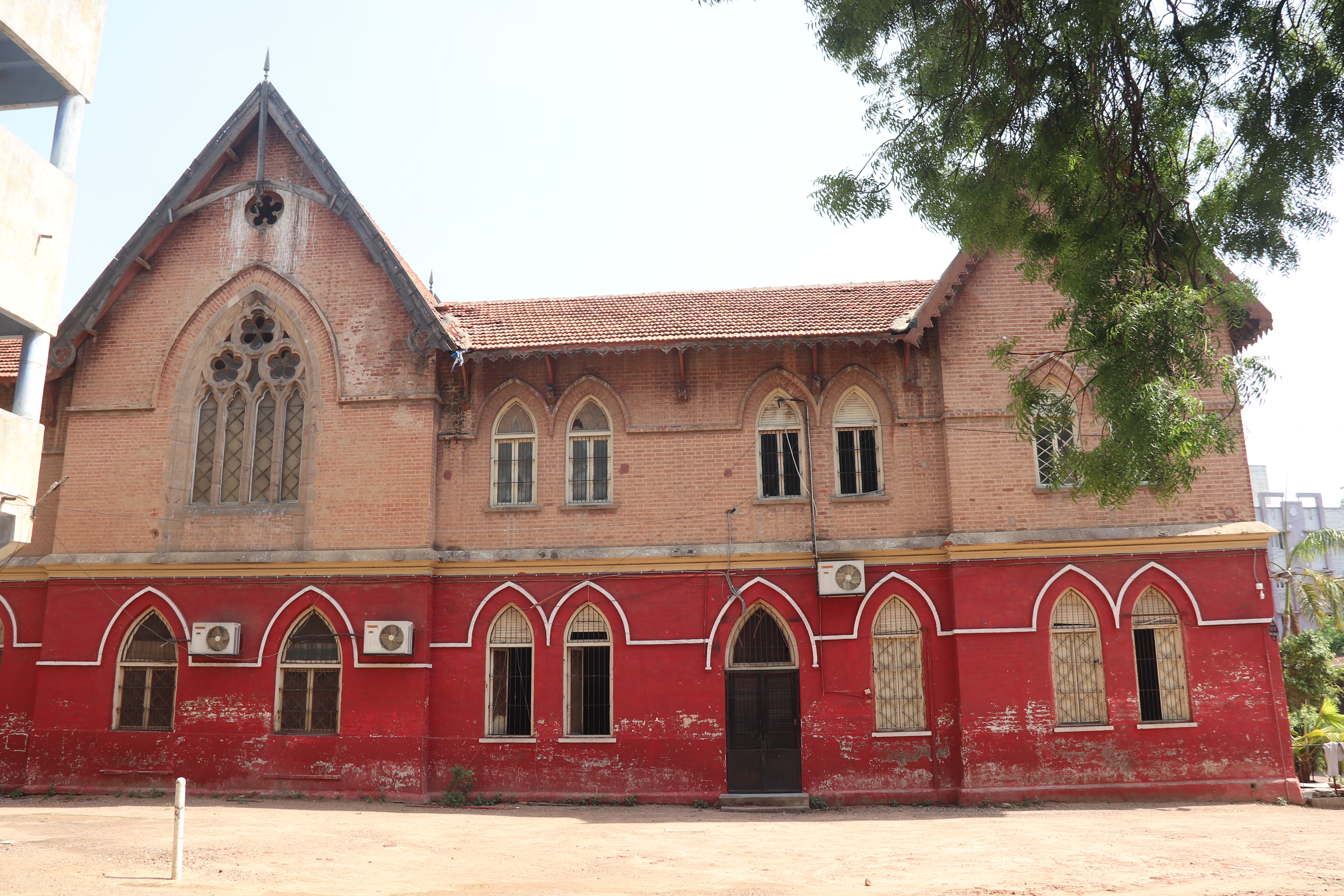
Gothic windows of old school building

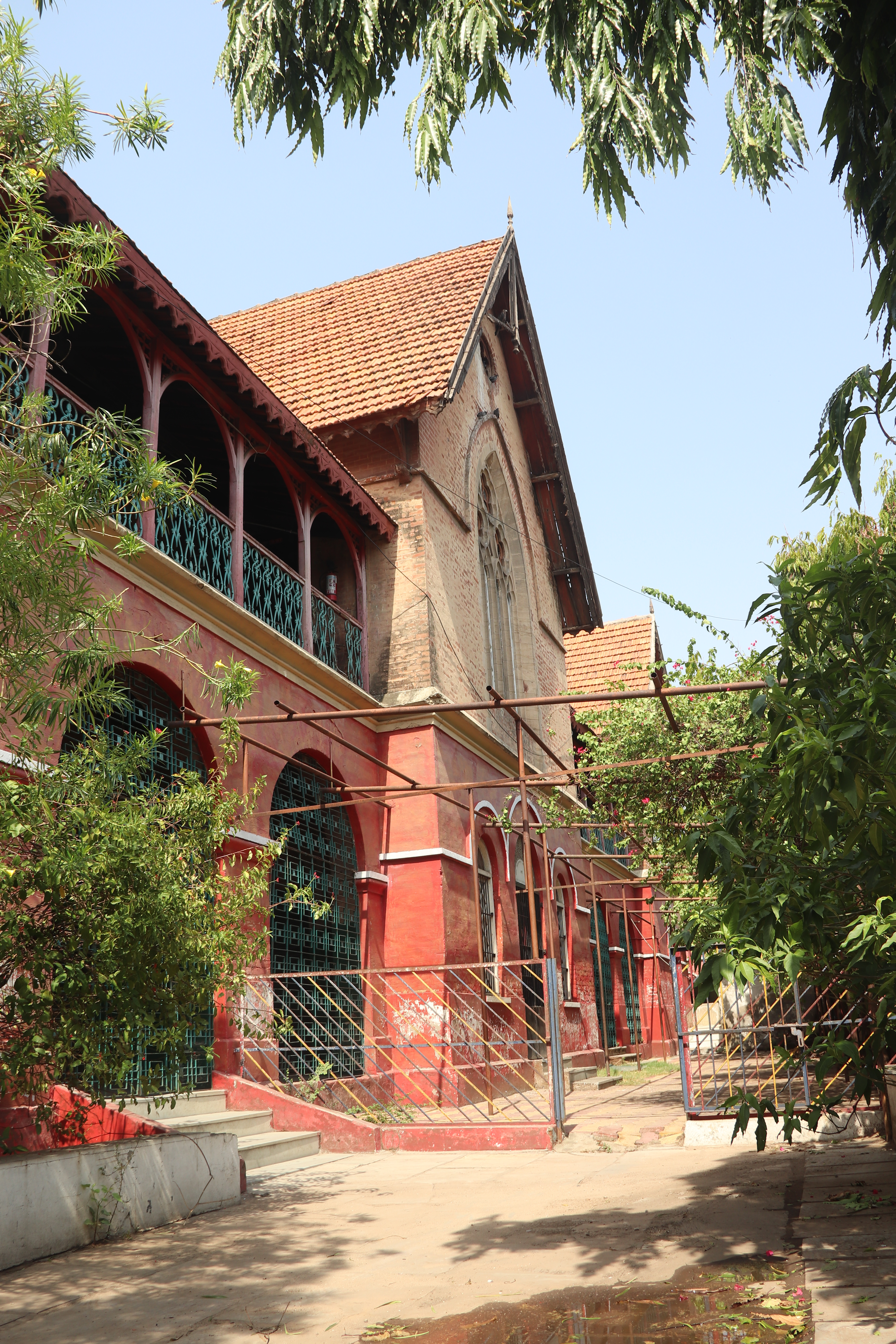
Facade of old school building (now administrative office)

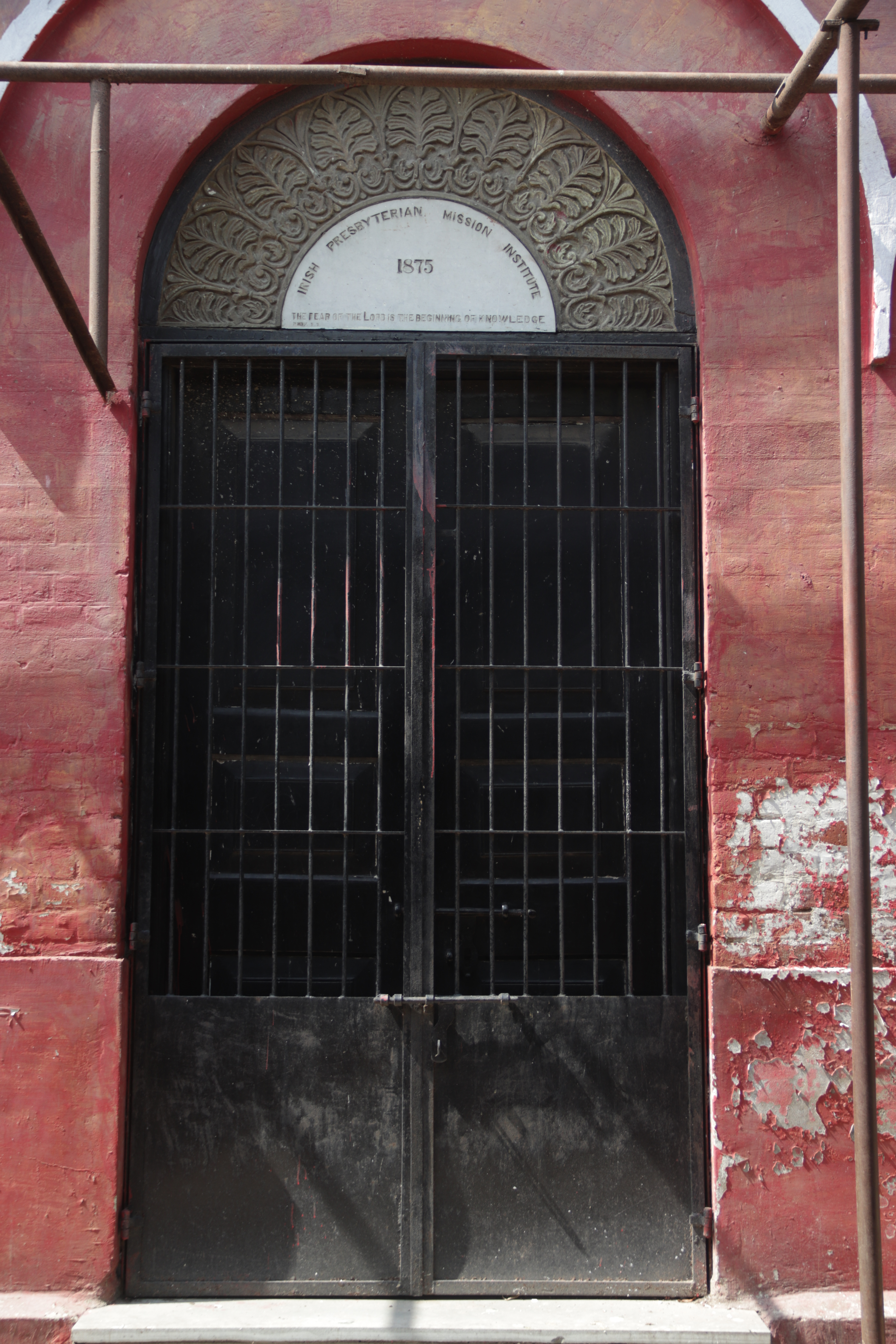
Old school building gate

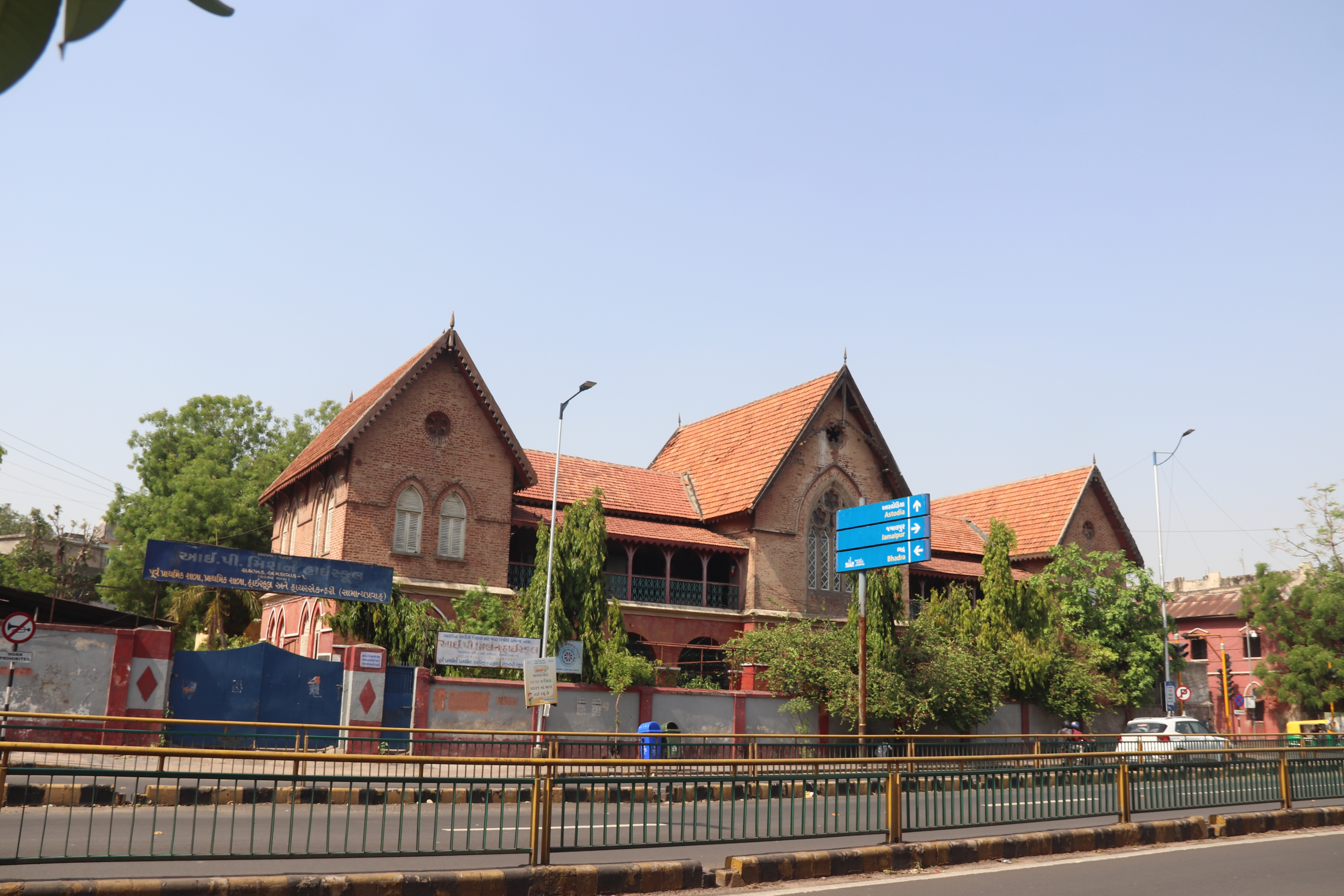
Building front as visible from the road

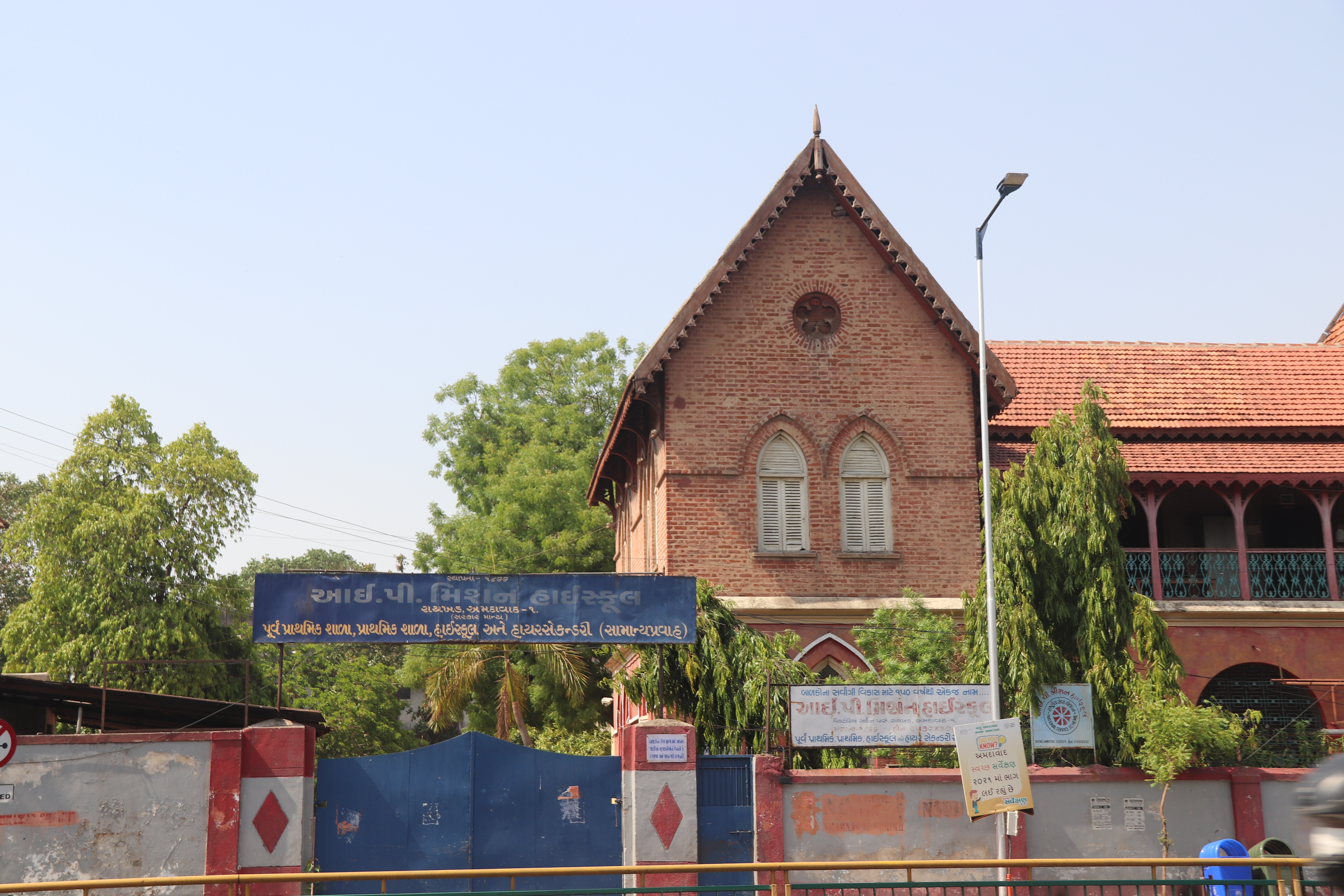
Gate

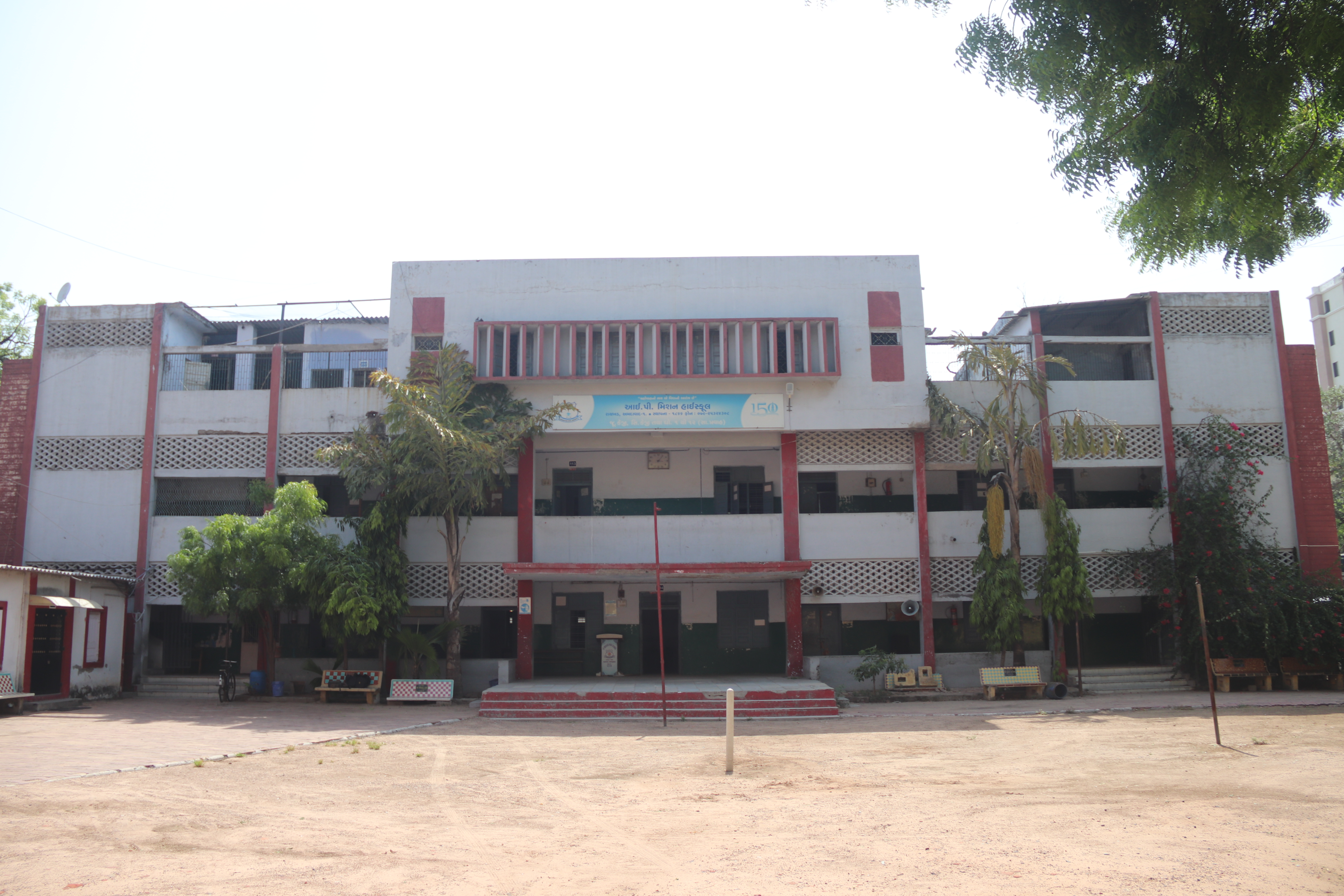
New school building

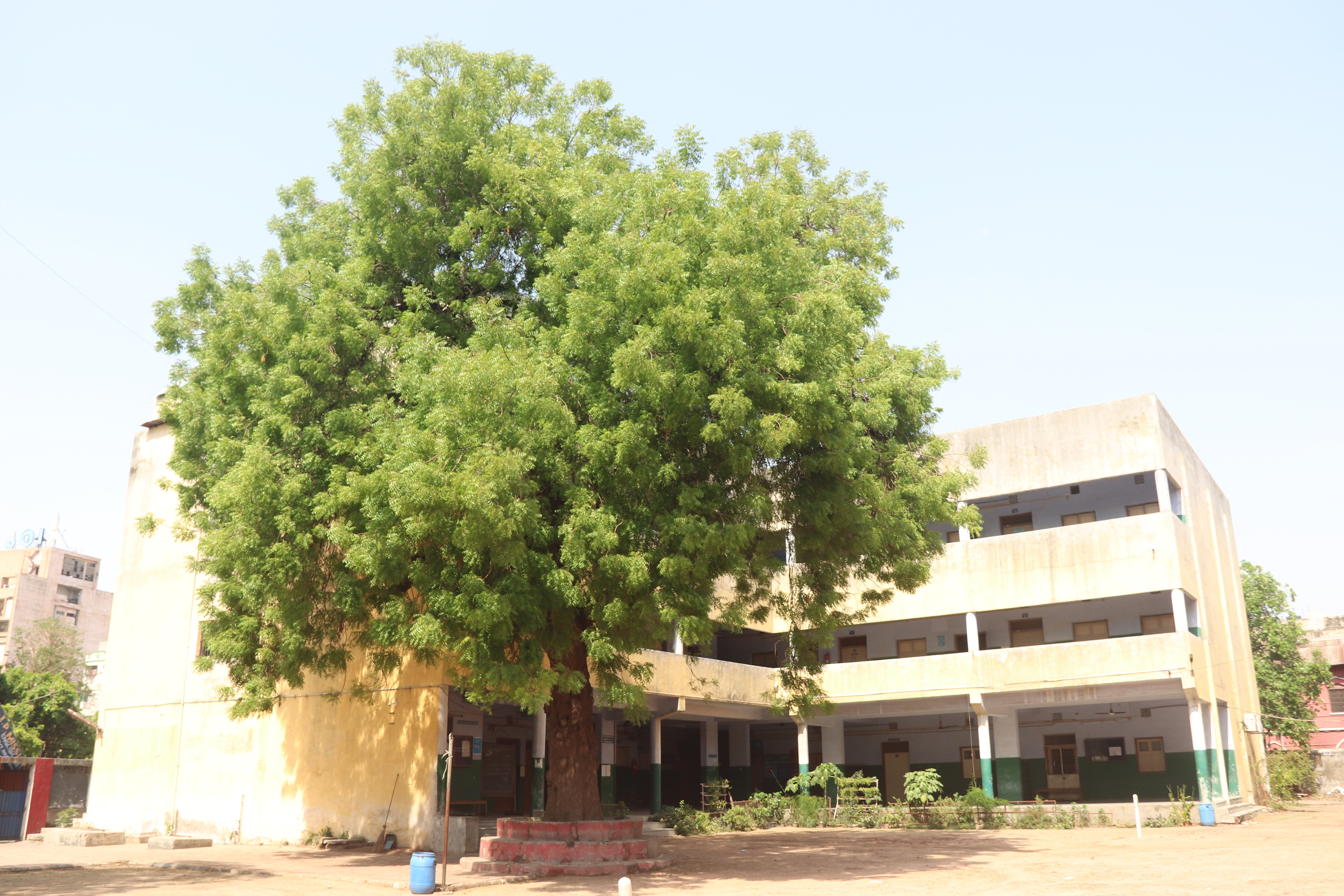
Another school building

== See also ==
- Sheth Chimanlal Nagindas Vidyalaya
