= Sri TVS Rao Srikrishna Vidya Mandir =

Location
- Dwaraka Nagar; Visakhapatnam, Andhra Pradesh, 530016; India; 17.728101616925237°N 83.30678811759226°E

Information
- School type: Co-educational, Private, Secondary School
- Established: 1975
- School board: Central Board of Secondary Education
- Area trustee: Bharateeya Vidya Kendram Visakhapatnam.
- Grades: LKG-10
- Language: English
- Houses: Sri Krishna Devaraya; Shivaji; Vivekananda; Raman

Sri T V S Rao Srikrishna Vidya Mandir is a co-educational school in Visakhapatnam. It was established in the year 1975 and is affiliated to the Central Board of Secondary Education.

== Campus ==
The school has a separate block for Kindergarten and Primary sections in Lalitha Nagar, Visakhapatnam. This block is also called Sri Kapila Gopal Rao Srikrishna Vidya Sisu Mandir.

The blocks for the upper primary and secondary sections are in Dwaraka Nagar, Visakhapatnam. The classrooms are in 2 building blocks christened as Dwaraka and Mathura respectively.

== Academics ==
The school is permanently affiliated to the Central Board of Secondary Education.

English is taught as the first language. As a second language, students are offered a choice between Telugu or Hindi. In addition, a third language of Sanskrit is introduced and taught until class 9. This third language, however is no longer continued for class 10. The basic computer-operating and computer-programming subjects like MS Word, Powerpoint Presentation, Excel sheets, HTML, basic C-language, etc. are also a few subjects being taught to students until class 9.

== Prayer ==
Morning prayer consists of meditation, saraswathi vandana, as well as chats of Aditya-Hrudayam and Gayatri-Matra. On Fridays, Mantra-Pushpam and Lingastakam are recited additionally.

== Extra curricular activities ==
There are weekly periods for physical training, sports, dance, and music. School students are also involved in community services.

=== Sports ===
Students are trained in sports of Volleyball, Kho-Kho, Kabaddi, and track-and-field events like Running (Sprints), Jumps (high- and long), and Throws (javelin-, discus- and shot put).

From 2010 on wards school focused on developing students in sports Students are successful in winning laurels at the State and National Levels.

=== Music and Dance ===
The school has its own music band and offers regular training lessons in instrumental music. There are also regular and crash course lessons in classical dance for students pursuing at professional levels or just annual day events respectively.

=== House System ===
In addition, there is a house system to promote leadership and group activities among students. Each house is further mentored by 2 teachers with a Student from 10th Std. as Captain and takes responsibility for leading the House team in both Physical and Cultural activities.

There are four houses namely Sri Krishna Deya Raya, Shivaji, Raman, and Vivekananda.

== Events ==
=== Sports and cultural fests ===
Every year a fest is organised by the school where students and their respective houses compete in different sports, cultural, and literature events.

Besides these intra-school events, students actively participate and have also won several awards at other inter-school, city, district, and state-level competitions annually.

Students of the school participate in Khelkhud (Sports Meet) organised at the District Level by its parent organisation BVK and winners will participate in State Level and National Level Khelkhud Organised by VIDYA BHARATI., Students who succeed in the National Meet will participate in the SGFI Sports Meet and compete with other state-level players. Students also actively participate in District, State and National Level Literature symposium - Vigyan Mela where students participate in Paper Presentations, Samskruti Gyan Pariksha, Science Quizzes and Science Exhibitions.

=== Annual Day ===
Students and their houses who have excelled in academics, extracurricular during the fests and all-round performances are awarded on the annual day.

=== Krishna Astami ===
On the eve of Krishna Janmashtami (or Lord Krishna' Birthday), a fancy dress competition called Bala-Gokulam is organised for kids in the morning. Whereas the school students showcase their house decorations along with short drama skits.

=== Indian Republic and Independence Days ===
Indian Republic and independence days are celebrated with great vigor with flag hoisting and patriotic songs.

== See also ==
- List of schools in India
- Visakhapatnam
