= Shri Gulab Rai Group of Institutions =

- Bareilly, Uttar Pradesh; India

Information
- Type: Private school
- Established: 1946
- Founder: Banwari Lal Agarwal
- Administrator: Rajesh Agarwal, Ravi Agarwal
- Principal: R.S. Rawat (Nainital Road); Sheel Saxena (Dohra Road)
- Grades: Pre-nursery – XII
- Language: English, Hindi
- Campus type: Urban
- Affiliations: CBSE, UP Board
- Website: grmschool.com

Shri Gulab Rai Group of Institutions is a private educational organisation operating three schools in Bareilly, Uttar Pradesh, India. Founded in 1946, it is administered by the Shri Namo Narayan Agarwal Educational and Charitable Trust and holds affiliations to both the Central Board of Secondary Education (CBSE) and the UP Board.

== History ==
=== Foundation ===
The group was established in 1946 by Banwari Lal Agarwal, a lawyer practising in Bareilly, as a memorial to his father, Rai Sahib Lala Gulab Rai Agarwal. The foundation stone of Shri Gulab Rai Inter College, the group's first institution, was laid by Govind Ballabh Pant, then Premier of the United Provinces and later a recipient of the Bharat Ratna.

=== Expansion ===
Following Banwari Lal Agarwal's death, management of the institutions passed to his son Namo Narain Agarwal. The trust currently administering the group is named in his memory. Management subsequently passed to Namo Narain's sons, Rajesh Agarwal (popularly known as Rajesh Jolly) and Ravi Agarwal, who currently oversee the group's operations.

== Campuses ==
=== Shri Gulab Rai Montessori Senior Secondary School, Nainital Road ===
The flagship campus on Nainital Road is affiliated to the CBSE (affiliation no. 2130510), with recognition valid through 31 March 2027. It offers classes from Class I to XII in Science and Commerce streams. R.S. Rawat serves as principal, with a separate junior wing building catering to younger students.

=== Shri Gulab Rai Montessori School, Dohra Road ===
The Dohra Road campus holds CBSE affiliation (affiliation no. 2132638), with recognition valid through 31 March 2027. It admits students from pre-nursery through Class XII and employs Montessori, kindergarten and playway teaching methodologies. Sheel Saxena serves as principal. While the campus is associated with the group's 1946 foundation, the Dohra branch as separately established in 2016.

=== Shri Gulab Rai Inter College ===
The Inter College holds affiliation to the UP Board and offers classes from Class VI to XII in Humanities, Science and Commerce streams. Students from the college have participated in programmes organised by government research institutions, including the Central Avian Research Institute.

== Academic programmes ==
The CBSE-affiliated schools deliver instruction primarily in English, supplemented by audio-visual teaching aids, and offer Computer Education, Dance, Music, Art and Physical Education as part of their curricula. The UP Board Inter College uses both Hindi and English as media of instruction.

== Events ==
=== Namo Narain Memorial Chrysanthemum Show ===
The school hosts an annual two-day horticultural exhibition in December on its campus grounds, known as the Namo Narain Memorial Chrysanthemum Show, organised in memory of Namo Narain Agarwal. The event draws participants from Bareilly and surrounding areas.

== See also ==
- Bareilly
- Education in Uttar Pradesh
- List of schools in Uttar Pradesh
