= St Joseph's Convent High School, Adilabad =

St Joseph's Convent High School
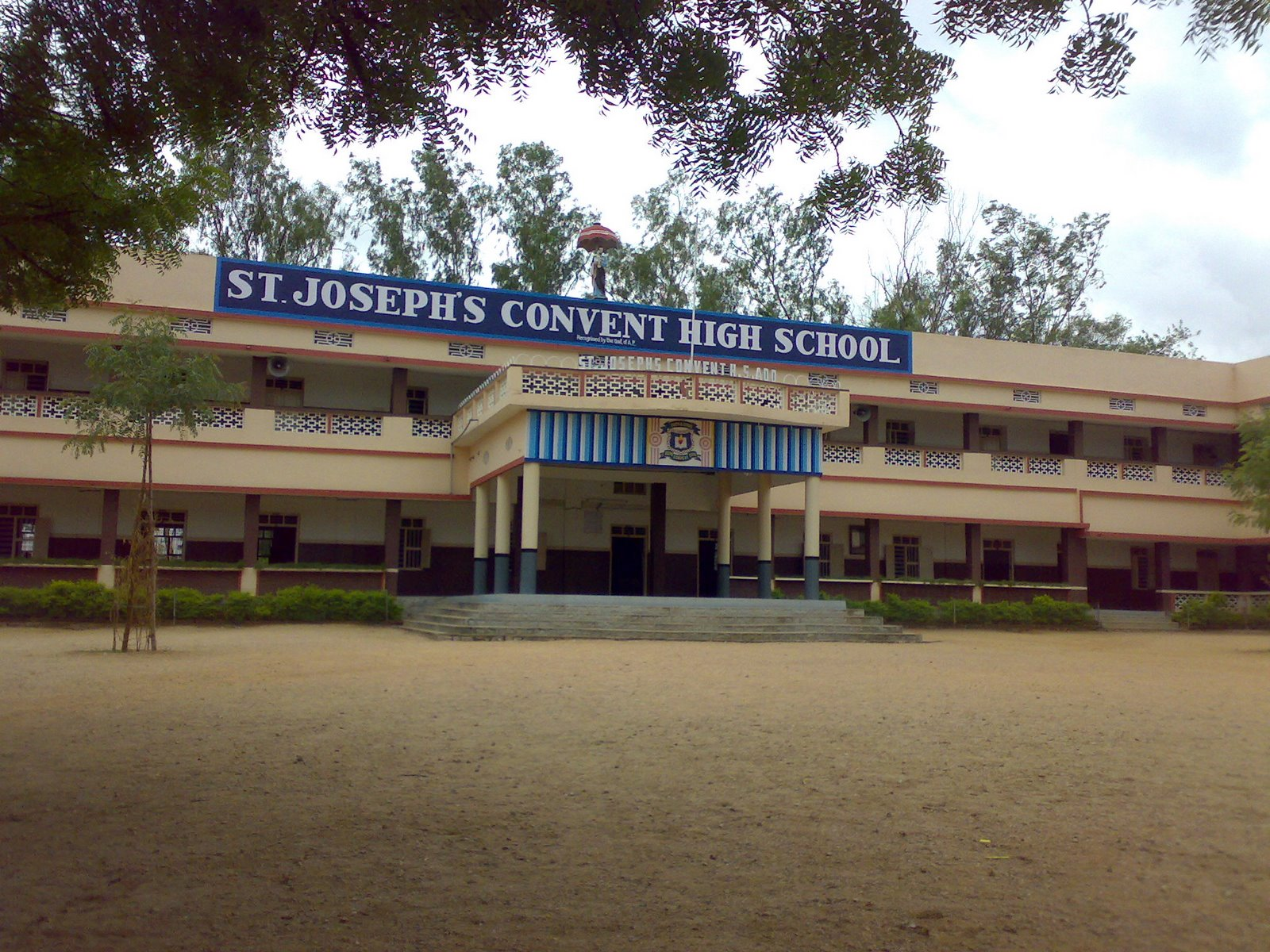

Location
- Ravindra Nagar Colony, Adilabad, Telangana, 504001; India; 19.664735°N 78.5300541°E

Information
- Type: Private; Co-education
- Motto: Truth and Service
- Religious affiliation: Sisters of Destitute
- Patron saint: Saint Joseph
- Established: November 1964
- Founder: Venerable Fr. Mar Varghese Payyappilly Palakkappilly
- Principal: Sr. Maria Rose S.D
- Faculty: 80+
- Years offered: 60
- Enrollment: 3,000+
- Website: www.stjosephs.in

St Joseph's Convent High School, Adilabad, is an English medium school in NTR Chowk, Bowliguda, Adilabad. It is a Christian minority institution run by the Sisters of the Destitute Educational Society, Adilabad. The school, situated at the district headquarters of Adilabad, began on 14 November 1964.

== Education ==
St Joseph's Convent High School instructs students up to the 10th standard and prepares students for the SSC (Class 10) Matriculation Examination. The medium of instruction is English. Electives and clubs offered include Religion and Moral Science, Communications, Drama, General Knowledge (Debate), Dance, Art, Music, among many others.

== History ==
It was started at the request of the District Collector, Shri Rajamani, IAS and the Superintendent of Police, Shri Subramaniam, IPS. They felt the need for an English Medium School, run by Catholics, in the backward areas. They approached Bishop Januarius CMI with a request to create the school. He put forward the matter to Mother General, Mother Rose Mary SD.

The land required for the establishment of the school was provided by Government and on 14 November 1964 the school came into existence. In 1979 the school was given permanent recognition by the Andhra Pradesh Government.

== Principals ==
| Years | Name of Principal |
|---|---|
| 1964 - 1971 | Sister Ancy Pappady |
| 1971 - 1980 | Sister Zosima |
| 1980 - 1984 | Sister Telma |
| 1985 - 1986 | Sister Maret |
| 1986 - 1989 | Sister Barbara |
| 1989 - 1990 | Sister Agusta |
| 1994 - 2001 | Sister Grecelet |
| 2001 - 2014 | Sister Cicil Jose |
| 2014 - 2017 | Sister Emil Mary |
| 2017 - 2021 | Sister Clare Tom |
| 2021 - | Sister Maria Rose |

== Correspondents ==
| Years | Name of Correspondent |
|---|---|
| | Sr. Corseena |
| | Sr. Ancy |
| | Sr. Maria |
| | Sr. Jean |
| | Sr. Felicita |
| | Sr. Consoletha |
| | Sr. Barbara |
| | Sr. Purissima |
| | Sr. Johncy |
| | Sr. Teena |
| | Sr. Sayujya |
| | Sr. Suma |
| | Sr. Aggie |
| | Sr. Lisanto |

== See also ==
- Education in India
- Matriculation
- Tenth Grade
- List of schools in India
- List of institutions of higher education in Telangana
