= Delhi Public School, Kalyanpur =

Private school in India

- India, India

Information
- School type: Private
- Motto: Service Before Self
- Established: 1997
- Principal: Dr. Richa Prakash
- Staff: 4 Plus
- Enrollment: 4 Plus
- Classes: Playgroup to Grade 12
- Affiliations: OK

Delhi Public School, Kalyanpur, was established in 1997. It is an English medium school affiliated to the Central Board of Secondary Education, New Delhi. It's one of the schools run by the Delhi Public School Society, New Delhi. The school is located at 26.31°N 80.15°E.

== Admissions ==
Admission to Nursery is through observation/interaction with the children.

There is a written evaluation for students seeking admission to Class I to Class XI.

== Academics ==
=== Curriculum ===
Primary level

- Integrated and interlinked curriculum, framed on the guidelines of NCERT
- Worksheets to enhance learning skills

Middle and secondary level

- NCERT prescribed curriculum
- Foreign languages are introduced

Senior secondary level

- CBSE curriculum
- The student council acts a resource for the students when they need help.

== Student life ==
=== Special assemblies and other programs ===
- Special assemblies are organised to celebrate festivals and occasions like Labor Day and Earth Day.
- For Environment Week students were taught about ways to stop pollution.
- Assemblies are held to celebrate festivals like Diwali, Eid, Christmas, and Janmashtmi.
- A summer science camp was held in the school where Prof. H.C. Verma, a nuclear experimental physicist stationed at IIT Kanpur, spoke on the 'Saga of Physicists'.
- An activity center was dedicated to the scientists Albert Einstein, Georg Ohm, Hans Christian Ørsted, Isaac Newton, Archimedes and Michael Faraday.
- BRICS, a student body from IIT Kanpur conducted a workshop on Robotics.
- The school hosts an annual techno-cultural-sports fiesta, Panorama.
- An 'All India National Workshop on Music & Dance for Teachers was conducted by vocalist Malini Awasthi.The discussion centered around the spring season, the festival Holi and the songs associated with them, mindful of the theme Madhumaas.

=== Panorama ===
Delhi Public School, Kalyanpur Kanpur is poised as every year to host PANORAMA 2018 - A Techno Cultural Literary Sports fiesta. It invites all the schools, from all the corners of the country and more to compete and give an expression and outlet to their talents. More than 100 schools participate. Every year celebrities like Anuv Jain, Ami Mishra, Darshan Raval, Parmish Verma etc are hosted by the school.

== Infrastructure ==
=== Sports ===
- Lawn tennis court
- Football field
- Volleyball court
- Badminton court
- Chess/carrom room
- Table tennis room
- 200 metre athletic track
- Handball court
- Basketball court
- Hockey field
- Squash courts
- Gymnasium
- Swimming pool

=== Academic infrastructure ===
- Social Science lab
- Computer labs
- Fine Arts lab
- English Language Lab
- Mathematics Lab
- Dance and Music Room
- Physics Lab
- Biology Lab
- Chemistry Lab
- Animation Lab
- Library

=== Other buildings/facilities ===
The school has its own auditorium, Rivera, with a capacity of over 2000 people. The auditorium is used for assemblies and cultural shows and fests. Inside the auditorium are three badminton courts and one basketball court. The school has a canteen where snacks are sold, and an infirmary where a qualified nurse looks after the well being of students.

== Achievements ==
- A student of the school took part in a music bonanza organised by a private radio channel. Among 15,000 participants, the student was analysed by a panel of highly acclaimed judges before he was placed in the top 3.
- Students of classes 10th and 12th have performed well in their board exams and have topped in the city as well as in the country.

== Controversies ==
In September 2017, a student from Delhi Public School, Kalyanpur, Kanpur, alleged that teachers had instructed other students to stay away from him, leading to social exclusion. The student later attempted suicide, citing distress caused by the situation. The incident received media attention.

In August 2026, a 15-year-old Class 10 student of the school died by suicide at his residence in Kalyanpur. Police began an investigation into the circumstances surrounding his death with preliminary investigation suggesting the reason of suicide is possibly stress related to studies.

== See also ==
- List of schools in Kanpur
- Delhi Public School Society
