= Nutan Vidyalaya Education Society =

Nutan Vidyalaya Education Society is an educational society based in Gulbarga. Founded in 1907, the society currently runs 12 institutions. Around 1857, the Bombay-Madras railway track was laid. The track passed through Gulbarga, allowing the youth of the city to use the railways to pursue higher education in Bombay and Pune. Vittalrao Deulgaonkar, a lawyer in Gulbarga, decided that it was time for Gulbarga to have an institution of higher learning of its own. Nutan Vidyalaya was started in a single room with just 7 students and their teacher Bapuji Govind Sathe. The first school established by the society was in Marathi medium while the medium of instruction in the region was Urdu. The Nutan Vidyalaya Education Society was constituted to whip up nationalistic feelings among the people under the regime of the Nizam of Hyderabad. The school had to encounter many difficulties and humiliations under the Nizam government. The Nizam government tried to dissuade the Nutan Vidyalaya Education Society to give up their venture. A lot of students and teachers were part of the freedom struggle. Mahatma Gandhi had visited the society in March 1927.
