= Shahibaug =

Shahibaug શાહીબાઘ
- Suburb
- Location in Ahmedabad, Gujarat, India Shahibaug (Gujarat) Shahibaug (India)
- Coordinates: 23.058°N 72.593°E
- Country: India
- State: Gujarat
- Metro: Ahmedabad

Government
  - Body: Ahmedabad Municipal Corporation
- Elevation: 53 m (174 ft)
- Time zone: UTC+5:30 (IST)
- PIN: 380 004
- Vehicle registration: GJ-1-XX-XXXX
- Civic agency: Ahmedabad Municipal Corporation

Shahibaug is a neighborhood in the city of Ahmedabad, India. It is primarily inhabited by the Marwadi and Jain communities, while the Dudheshwar area in the west of Shahibaug has sizeable populations of Muslims and migrants from other states. One of the wealthiest districts of the city, Shahibaug is known for its gastronomy, particularly Rajasthani cuisine.

== History ==
Shahibaug, or the Royal Garden Palace, was built in 1622 by Shah Jahan, Viceroy of Ahmedabad (1616-1622), to provide work for the poor during a period of scarcity. The palace is now known as Moti Shahi Mahal. The Shahibaug gardens were a noted resort in the 17th century.

In around 1835, two large wings and several rooms and terraces were added to the original centre saloon by Mr. Williams of the Civil Service. A short distance from the royal mansion, on the bank of the Sabarmati River, was the zanana or ladies' palace, with separate gardens, baths and fountains. The apartments for the officers and attendants of the court were slightly further away.

In 1856, Alexander Kinloch Forbes described the palace thus:

The saloon is spacious and lofty as the building; the walls are covered with a white stucco, polished like the finest marble, and the ceiling is painted in small compartments with much taste. The angular recesses lead to eight small octagon rooms, four below and as many above with separate stairs to each. They are finished in the same style as the saloon, the walls like alabaster and the ceiling embossed. The flat roof commands a wide view; the rooms under the saloon, and a surrounding platform ornamented with small canals and fountains, form a cool retreat.

The solid stone wall preventing the river from passing south towards the city was damaged during severe flooding in 1875, and sand was washed over it, covering and destroying the garden beds. Since then, the water has been much deeper along the wall, and the current much stronger than previously.

Rabindranath Tagore stayed in the Moti Shahi Mahal in Shahibaug during his visit to Gujarat, where he found inspiration for his short story "Hungry Stones".

== Education ==
Schools in Shahibaug include:

- Rachana School
- Earth English School
- Kendriya Vidyalaya No 1 - affiliated with the Central Board of Secondary Education
- Kendriya Vidyalaya No 2 - Second Kendriya Vidyalaya school Near Hanuman Camp
- Rosery School
- Amrut High School
- The H.B.Kapadia New High School
- Aryan Gurukul
- Rajasthan Hindi High School

== Politics ==
Shahibaug is part of the Asarwa constituency of the Gujarat Legislative Assembly, and part of the Ahmedabad East constituency of the Lok Sabha.
