= Guru Nanak Fifth Centenary School =

- Vincent Hill
- Mussoorie; India

Information
- Type: Residential
- Established: 1969; 57 years ago
- Area trustee: Seventh-day Adventists (Until 1969); Guru Nanak Fifth Centenary Society (1969–present)
- Principal: Anil Kumar Tewari
- Headmaster: Kuldeep Singh Tyagi
- Grades: Kindergartan To 12th
- Language: English
- Campus: Shangri-la, Vincent Hill
- Affiliations: CICSE
- Website: gnfcschool.com

Guru Nanak Fifth Centenary school Mussoorie (G.N.F.C.S) is a Sikh, international, English medium school in India, Mussoorie. G.N.F.C.S is a boarding school with two separate campuses for boys and girls. The short name for the boys' school is Vincent-Hill while the girls' school is called Shangri-La. G.N.F.C School is located in Mussoorie hill station in Uttrakhand. Vincent-Hill was officially established on 1969 and Shangri-La was founded on 1977.

== History ==
The school was earlier known as Vincent Hill School. It was managed by Seventh-day Adventists till 1969 when S. Mehtab Singh acquired it. S. Mehtab Singh founded G.N.F.C school in honour of Guru Nanak's 500th birthday anniversary, which was in November 1969. The Fifth Centenary School Society was formed to manage the affairs of the institution. It was registered under the Indian Societies Registration Act, in June 1970.

== Location ==
G.N.F.C school is located on the footstep of a Himalayan mountain called Mussoorie in the Uttarakhand State. The school is located 6750 feet above sea level and is on an 11-acre plot of land. The hill is covered with various kinds of trees, but it is the home for the famous Himalayan cedar tree. The school is about 2 km away from the Mussoorie library point.

== Affiliation ==
G.N.F.C school is affiliated with the Council for the Indian School Certificate Examinations.The School is affiliated with Indian Certificate of Secondary Education (ICSE) for class 10 examination and is affiliated with Indian School Certificate (ISC) for class 12 examinations which are both conducted by the Council for the Indian School Certificate Examinations, New Delhi.

== Academic program ==
The school provides student with two academic streams: a science track and a commerce track. Students can opt for either science or commerce after entering grade 9. After completing ICSE courses, students will have one more opportunity to select their desired line of academic study. The school year is divided into two academic sessions called Midterm (March – June) and final (July to November). In each session there are 2 monthly tests for students above grade 7th and 3 monthly tests for students in Kindergarten to 6th grade.

== Controversies ==
In September 2022, a student of Guru Nanak Fifth Centenary School, Abhay Goel, participated in an event organised by the Mussoorie Municipal Corporation. During his address, he argued that the demolition of illegal structures in India should be carried out only after notice had been served on the property owners, emphasising the importance of due process. In support of his remarks, he specifically cited a BBC News article discussing the issue. According to published reports, the remarks attracted criticisms from some local traders and environmentalists in Mussoorie, who disagreed with his position. The incident received local attention as a public controversy concerning municipal enforcement and property rights.
