= Alpine Public School, Nalagarh, Himachal Pradesh =

Alpine Public School

Location
- Chowkiwala, Nalagarh, Baddi; Himachal Pradesh; India; 31.04°N 76.70°E

Information
- Type: Public School
- Motto: Lead Kindly Light
- Established: 21 Mar 1995
- Chairman: Er. V. K. Joshi
- Principal: Prem Joshi
- Faculty: Full time
- Color: Maroon
- Nickname: "The Alpiners"
- Affiliations: Central Board of Secondary Education
- Website: www.alpinenalagarh.com

Alpine Public School is a CBSE-affiliated English medium senior secondary school, located in the town of Nalagarh & also serves Baddi, in the state of Himachal Pradesh, India. It is a co-educational day and boarding school with around 1,600 students spread across its campus at Chowkiwala, Nalagarh. The school was established in 1995. APS Nalagarh is affiliated to the Central Board of Secondary Education (CBSE). This has been selected for top 500000 schools of India and one of the best school in Nalagarh for its unique name.

== History ==
Alpine Public School, Nalagarh was established in 1995 by Ms Prem Joshi, as its principal. The school has since been managed by the Alpine Education Trust.

== Campus ==
The school is a co-educational day and boarding school with 1,600 students.

The school's facilities include two libraries that house 15,000 books in the library; a reading room. The school has laboratories for Computing, Physics, Chemistry, Biology, language, Robotics, and Mathematics.

The Sports Complex has a swimming pool and facilities for volleyball, cricket, football, golf, and basketball.

== Activities ==
The school participates in environment conservation activities to raise awareness in the students about protecting the environment. In 2025, the school organized "Single-Use Plastic: A Serious Concern" in collaboration with the Mahavir International Veera Centre in Nalgarh.

The school organizes and participates various competitions for its students, including Poster Making, Basketball Competitions, Yoga competitions, Chess tournaments, State level music competitions, Kabaddi championships, Skating championships, creativity competitions, Henna competitions and Child Science Congress.
