= Rotary English Medium School, Ranibennur =

School in Karnataka, India

Location
- Ranebennuru; India; 14.62341°N 75.63618°E

Information
- Established: 1979; 47 years ago
- Language: English

Rotary English Medium School, founded in 1979, was the first English medium school in Ranibennur. It was started by the local chapter of the Rotary International Club. The school, that started with just two classrooms, is now a junior composite college with a bachelors program spreading over 7 acres (28,000 m^{2}). The school runs Classes 5 to 10 and is co-educational. The medium of instruction in English. It has 12 classrooms.

The founding members of the school included Veerabhadra Shetty, KS Nadiger and CV Punit. The first head mistress of the school was Sumangala. She was succeeded by Mariamma Mathen, who headed the school for almost 15 years. The school is managed by body with VP Linganagoudar as general secretary.
