= Satavahana College =

College in Vijayawada, Andhra Pradesh, India

- Established: 1971
- Location: Vijayawada, Andhra Pradesh, India

Satavahana College was established in 1971 by Sri Durga Malleswara Educational Society at Seetaramapuram, Vijayawada, Krishna District, Andhra Pradesh, India. It is affiliated to Krishna University, Machilipatnam, Krishna District, Andhra Pradesh, India

== See also ==
- Universities and colleges in India
- Education in India
