= Sneha Shikshana Samsthe Sullia =

The Sneha Shikshana Samsthe Sullia is a group of schools in Sullia town, India.

It is located on the campus at Snehshila, on right side of Mani-Mysore state highway nearly 1.25 km from Sullia KSRTC bus stand. It established its first school in 1996 and another in 2000.

== Curriculum ==
Classes are offered from pre-kindergarten to Secondary School Leaving Certificate. The school is maintained under the management of the Sneha Shikshana Samsthe Sullia, which is managed by a group of friends including doctors, academics and industrialists. Sneha means friendship.

The organization head is Chandrashekhara Damle. Correspondent for the institution is Vidyashambhava Pare, surgeon. The directors include Bridge man of India Girish Bharadwaj who recently got a CNN-IBN senior citizen award and

K Ananda Kumar, inventor of Concood (a type of concrete that can replace wood) and founder of Master Planer.

The school 7 times secured a 100% result in Secondary School Leaving Certificate exams held by Karnataka State Secondary education Board, Bangalore.

== Institutions ==
- Sneha Kannada Medium higher primary School
- Sneha English Medium High School

== Alumnae ==
Sneha Sammilana of Alumnus-2018' a get-together of old students of Nittur Higher Primary School was held at the school campus on Sunday 23 December 2018. The programme was organised by the old students committee.
