= Venkatagiri Raja High School =

Venkatagiri Raja High School (V R High School)

Location
- Pogathota; Nellore, Andhra Pradesh; India
- Coordinates: 14.44708°N 79.98269°E

Information
- Type: High School
- Established: 1875
- Founder: Venkatagiri Estate Rajas
- Founding vice chairman: Enugu Sundara Rami Reddy
- Founding director: K. Ramalinga Reddy
- Founding Principal: Sunku Narayana Swamy Chetty

Venkatagiri Raja High School (V R High School) is a co-education high school in Nellore, Andhra Pradesh, India. It was established in 1875.

== History ==
During late 19th Century, There was only one High school named Free Church Mission High school in Nellore which was established and maintained by Christian Missionary. According to then District Collector Vans Agnew, Nellore citizens were against educating their children in a Christian missionary school and exposing them to Christian teachings.

In 1873, Nellore mandal’s first graduate, Sunku Narayana Swamy Chetty, joined the missionary school as head master. He resigned from this position in 1875 due to differences with school's principal, Reverend John MacMillan. Chetty's resignation had further catalyzed the Nellore citizens to start a new Hindu School. Later in 1875, Chetty went to Krishnapatnam to meet a collector who was conducting a Jamabandhi camp there. Some district employees convinced Chetty to take the initiative and start a Hindu school. At the next town hall in Nellore, construction of Hindu school and appointment of Chetty as its head master was authorized.

=== Hindu mission inauguration ===
On 3 May 1875, Hindu Anglo Vernacular School was inaugurated. Along with Chetty as head master, five other teachers were appointed. The school attracted 152 students in the first year.

=== Rivalry with FCM School ===
With Swamy's efforts, the school grew. People called the school B.A. gari paatasala meaning Mr.B.A.’s school. There were hurdles; FCM school officials had developed personal hatred of Swamy and lodged allegations of unfair competition and incompetent staff. An inspector conducted an inquiry and condemned the allegations. Barrow succumbed to the pressure of FCM school's principal Macmillan and called for a town hall to discuss the necessity of second high school. In-charge collector T. Von D. Hardings presided over this town hall, which recommended that there was no need for a second school of higher education in Nellore. After a second collector took over the investigation, the need for second school was justified and a grant was recommended. After further legal maneuvers, the school's grant was stopped. As a last resort, the committee approached Madras Governor Duke of Buckingham and pleaded for his help to no avail. As the financial condition of the school deteriorated, the school started taking donations to close the deficit. Based on the recommendation of Nellore Catholic Priest Rev. C.R. Mitchel, Madras Roman Catholic Bishop agreed to send a donation of Rs. 10/- per month, but the financial troubles continued. Chetty sacrificed his position in 1878 and continued to work persistently for the growth of the school, which resulted in school being recognized in 1879 and receiving government grants from that year.

=== Acquisition of premises ===
The school was opened in a rented house near the city's Collector office. Space considerations led to several location changes until a permanent location was found. On 27 February 1879 Haji Mohammad Rahimtulla, Ex-Diwan of Venkatagiri estate purchased the present V R College premises in a court auction. He donated the facilities to Hindu High School and it was registered in the school's name on 24 November 1879. Rahimutulla continued as a school committee member until his retirement in 1886.

=== Change of name ===
The financial condition of the school was not improving. Venkatagiri Raja purchased a Government bond for Rs. 15,000/- with the condition that the school should be named for him. In 1887 the buildings were in a bad state and the government grant was stopped. Raja's help was again requested; he gave a Rs. 5000/- donation and another Rs.5000/- as a loan which was later fully paid. With this money repairs were completed and three new classrooms were constructed. This new block was inaugurated by Madras Governor Lord Connemara on 12 November 1888. The government grant was restarted in 1889, and as an additional financial security to the school, management purchased ten shares in Nellore Permanent Fund in 1900. In 1901, the school received legal status as a registered society under XXI law of 1860. In 1901, Abdul Kareem Khan Saheb had donated a house worth Rs.2000/- to run a branch school. In 1902, Madras Governor Lord Ampthill visited the school and participated in a prize distribution ceremony. On this occasion, the foundation stone was laid for a new block. The room next to the East Hall on the North Side was built by Raja Velugoti Krishna Yachendra Velugoti Dynasty Bahadur (younger brother of Venkatagiri Raja) at a cost of Rs. 11,300/-.

== Branch schools ==
A branch school was started in town in 1889, which was re-merged with the parent school after few years. In 1905, another school in town by the name of Akkaraju Raghavaiah Primary School became a branch school. It was also merged with parent school in October 1908. In May 1908, another branch school was opened in Ranganayakula Pet of Nellore but was closed in 1909 due to financial troubles. Between 1912 and 1928, the Mutharaju Subbaramaiah School in Chinna Bazar Nellore was made a branch school and became popular among locals of that area. As the school's popularity and reputation increased, the number of students increased and classes were conducted in semi-permanent rooms that were constructed on the North side of the play ground.

== Building ==
Construction of the present school building was started in 1950 and by 1964 high school classes were shifted to the new building. Enuga Sundara Rami Reddy had personally supervised the construction of the building from the foundation stage. He completed the entire building except for two rooms prior to his illness and death in 1961.

Based on the recommendations of the Lakshmanaswamy Mudaliar Committee, a seven-year secondary school education system was introduced in the state. The high school was upgraded to Higher Secondary School in 1960 and classes from grade VI to grade XII were introduced. The first batch of grade XII students passed out from the school in 1961 under the leadership of K.Ramalinga Reddy as Head Master. During his era, an incomplete building on the northeast side of the grounds was completed. There was a gradual improvement in the H.S.L.C exam results and by 1968, it reached 83% - a record in the school's history. An English medium was started in the school, which further attracted students.

In 1966-69, the government of Andhra Pradesh had introduced an Integrated Syllabus. In line with this the government proposed converting the high school into a junior college by having five years of secondary education, two years of intermediate and three years of degree education all under the same umbrella. As there was already a first grade college under the control of the same management committee, the proposal was declined. This resulted in the school being downgraded to a secondary school.

== Library ==
The school's library was first established in 1875 by donated books. At present, the library holds more than 10,000 books spread across Telugu, English, Hindi, Sanskrit and Urdu languages. There are more than 100 encyclopedias. A reading room attached to the library is frequented by students during their recess periods.
