= Training College, Rajahmundry =

Secondary school in India

The Government High School for Boys (also called the Government Model School) is a secondary school situated on the banks of the Godavari River in Rajamahendravaram, East Godavari district, India, the cultural capital of Andhra Pradesh state.

The institution was initially established for Bachelor of Education training in 1883, making it one of the oldest schools in India. Later, the Government Model School for Boys was established and folded into the institution.

To mark its centennial, a pylon was placed on 7 April 1987 by Sri Gyani Zail Singh, then-President of India. The high school conducts NCC camps for students of VIII, IX and X standards.
