= St. George Higher Secondary School Kattappana =

Location
- Kerala; India
- Coordinates: 9.748°N 77.113°E

Information
- Principal: MANI K C
- Campus Director: FR.JOSE MANGALITHIL
- Website: http://sghsskattappana.com/

St. George HSS Kattappana is a combined primary and secondary school. It is situated in the centre of Kattappana, Kerala, India. The school is managed by the Syro-Malabar Catholic Diocese of Kanjirappally. Present head of institution is Mr.Mani K C(Principal) The Kerala State school code is 06026.

== History ==
St. George's was started by the St. George Forene church in 1959. The founder of the school was Fr. Alexander Vayalunkal. Sri E.T. Varkey was the first Head Master. The school was upgraded to Higher Secondary School in 1998. Smt. Marykutty Thomas was the first principal of the school, followed by Sri. MC Chandy. Sr. Mollyamma Sebastian was the first official principal of the school, since the government sanctioned the principal posts in 2006. The present principal is Sri. Mani K C.

== Uniformed organisations ==
A senior division of 16 Kerala Battalion National Cadet Corps operates in this school with an allotted strength of 52 cadets.

St. George is a member of the Student Police Cadet scheme.

== Career guidance and counselling ==
The District Centre of Career Guidance and Counselling of the Higher Secondary Education Department is based at this school.
