= BSF Senior Secondary School, Jammu =

School in Jammu and Kashmir

Coordinates: 32.751°N 74.820°E

Information
- Established: 1972; 54 years ago
- Website: www.bsfschooljammu.org

BSF Senior Secondary School is a school situated in Jammu city of the Union Territory of Jammu and Kashmir and is run by [[Border BSF School Jammu started as a primary school in 1972 with 49 students on its roll and seven teachers on its staff. The school was re-organised as a residential institution]], upgraded to the secondary level and was affiliated with CBSE New Delhi in June, 1976. The first batch of boarders was admitted in July, 1976. The school has been running with two classes with Medical / Non-Medical streams since 1982. Later it added to the curriculum the Commerce and Arts streams.

The school has primary and secondary wings. The primary section has its own spacious building with all facilities. The secondary section has a massive building surrounded by a garden complex around and inside. It was inaugurated in 1977–78.

BSF Senior Secondary School, Jammu is situated in the open battle field of J&K. It caters to the academic requirement of the wards of BSF personnel of J&K and Himachal Pradesh and some students from the different BNs located in other eastern and western frontiers. There are 1786 students in the secondary section and 1052 students in the primary section, the largest number among all other BSF Schools.

In 2020, the school was temporarily closed due to the COVID-19 pandemic.
