= Prometheus School =

Primary and secondary school in India

- Noida, Uttar Pradesh; India

Information
- Type: IB Continuum School offering Cambridge IGCSE and A levels - PYP, MYP and DP
- Established: 2019
- Status: Open
- Chairman: Mukesh Sharma
- Principal: Namrta Pande (Vice Principal Senior Wing) and Aneesha Sahni (Principal Junior Wing)
- Years offered: K-12
- Area: 7 acres land
- Affiliations: IB (Authorized)
- Website: prometheusschool.com

Prometheus School is a co-educational school in Noida, Uttar Pradesh, India. The school is following authorization as an IB World School.

== History ==
Prometheus school was founded in 2019. Mukesh Sharma is the chairman of the school. He is also the founder and CEO of QA InfoTech, a software company based in Noida. Chairman, Mr. Mukesh Sharma was recognized as the most Enterprising Education Leader of the Year by ScooNews Great Indian Learning Awards 2021.

On May 18, 2020, the school appointed Ms. Rashima Vaid as the Principal of the Secondary School. She has done her Master of Philosophy (M.Phil.) in International Relations from Jawaharlal Nehru University. She has engaged closely with two IB programmes – the MYP and DP in various capacities including IB Teacher (French for MYP and DP), IB examiner (MYP and DP) and IB curriculum coordinator (MYP). Ms. Aneesha Sahni is the Primary school Principal at Prometheus School. She is a postgraduate in Marketing and Finance from Delhi University. She also holds a South Australian certificate for teaching English as a Second Language (ELS) in a mainstream class. She has attended numerous IBPYP Category 1,2 and 3 workshops and early childhood education courses in the United Kingdom including Managing EYFS, The Ultimate Early Years Environment and Language and Literacy in Early Childhood.

Prometheus School has been among the first in the country to start the directed online learning programs for students ever since schools have been closed in April 2020 due to COVID-19 pandemic. The school has announced online classroom sessions for students of grade 5, 6 and 7 who don't have access to online classroom sessions. The School takes a fee for these online sessions only to donate in Prime Minister’s Citizen Assistance and Relief in Emergency Situations Fund (PM CARES Fund).

Excellence and Innovation in Online Teaching Award has been bestowed upon Prometheus School by the Indian Glory Awards Conference ‘21

The school has also received the Best School Using Technology by Indian Glory Awards.

== Academic and curriculum ==
The School has applied for The International Baccalaureate Primary Years Programme (PYP) for students. Prometheus School offers international curriculum for all three sections - Primary, Middle and High School.

The School has been recognized as the Best School Using Technology by the Global Teaching Excellence Awards.

Prometheus School was awarded the second position in the International day school category among schools of Noida and seventh position among schools of Delhi NCR. Prometheus School has been awarded the Top International Emerging School in India by Education Today in the India School Merit Awards.

The School gained recognition as an IB MYP Candidate Certificate school in 2021. Another incredible accomplishment for Prometheus. Prometheus School, Noida joins the IB continuum club. They are the only IB Continuum School in India that offers Cambridge IGCSE and A-Levels. The school has won the Education Icon Award for the Most Qualified Staff Faculty.

- International Baccalaureate
- NES International School
- IB Primary Years Programme
