= Kizhakkummuri =

Coordinates: 11°20′N 75°49′E

- village
- Interactive map of Kizhakkummuri
- Country: India
- State: Kerala
- District: Thrissur

Population (2011)
  - Total: 14,905

Languages
  - Official: Malayalam, English
- Time zone: UTC+5:30 (IST)
- PIN: 6XXXXX
- Vehicle registration: KL-

Kizhakkummuri is a village in Thrissur district in the state of Kerala, India.

== See also ==
- G.U.P.S, Padinhattummuri
