= Guru Amar Das Public School =

Coordinates: 31.3895°N 75.2401°E

Guru Amar Dass Public School, Jalandhar established in 1983 is a co-educational English Medium School affiliated to C.B.S.E., New Delhi. The name of the educational institution has been drawn from the third Guru of the Sikhs Shri Guru Amar Dass Ji, who has an embodiment of humility and Service. The motto of the school is "Enlightenment with Education". Presently, the school has an enrolment of more than 2500 students.

The school has two wings, the secondary wing of the school is situated at Model Town, Jalandhar and the primary wing is situated at Guru Teg Bahadur Nagar, Jalandhar.
