= Jai Hind High school (Edwards), Ankola =

Jai Hind High school, Ankola is one of the oldest high schools in Uttar Kannada. The high school was built in 1896 during British people rule in India. Formerly it was known as Edward New English School. The school was built by Vamanrao M. Dubhashi.

== Former headmasters ==
- Vamanrao M. Dubhashi (1896–1900)
- Baburao M. Naik (1900–1902)
- Narahari Phene (1902–1907)
- Narayan G. Nadakarni (1907–1919)
- Vishwanath P. Prabhu (1919–1922)
- Shridhar V. Bhat (1922–1924)
- K. Padmanabh Prabhu (1924–1925)
- Narayan M. Moodbhatkal (1925–1951)
- Shankar P. Pikle (1951–1969)
- Yashavant M. Kamat (1969–1075)
- Manohar V. Gaitonde(1975–1976)
- R. K. Naik (1976–1989)
- G. J. Nayak (1989–1996)
- Arundhati Nayak (1996–2002)
- S. G. Bhat
- Shakuntala Shanbhag
- R. S. Kamat
- Vittal Ager
