= TMS Jogani High School =

TMS Jogani Vidhyala

Location
- Ward No.1, At & Post:Khimat - 385545, Dhanera Taluka, Gujarat; Khimat, 385545; India; 24.49547°N 72.18664°E

Information
- Type: Private school
- Established: 2012; 14 years ago
- Founder: Jogani Family
- Grades: 9–12
- Gender: Co-Ed
- Affiliation: Gujarat Secondary and Higher Secondary Education Board

TMS Jogani Vidhyala is a co-educational High School located in Khimat Village of Dhanera Taluka of Vav-Tharad district of Gujarat, India. The full name of school is Smt. Taraben Manchhalal Samjibhai Jogani Vidhyala. It is named after founder and chief donor Jogani family's mother, which they named as a memorial to her.

The high school was established in 2012, and it grew out of TMS Jogani Jagruti Primary School. Firstly, Primary School was founded in 1997, which consists of class from 1st to 8th. As need for high school arose, the trustees decided to start high school in village, so students do not have to go out of village for higher classes. Thus in 2012 TMS Jogani Vidhyala was founded, which consists of class of 9th to 12th.

The school is privately run school, run by private charitable trust. It is affiliated to Gujarat Secondary and Higher Secondary Education Board

The school also often organises many social, cultural, quiz and educational programs. The Gujarat State Health department under National Tobacco Control Program also held awareness and drugs awareness and de-addiction program in school in 2022.
