= Little Flower School, Mudinepalli =

Little Flower English Medium High School - Mudinepalli
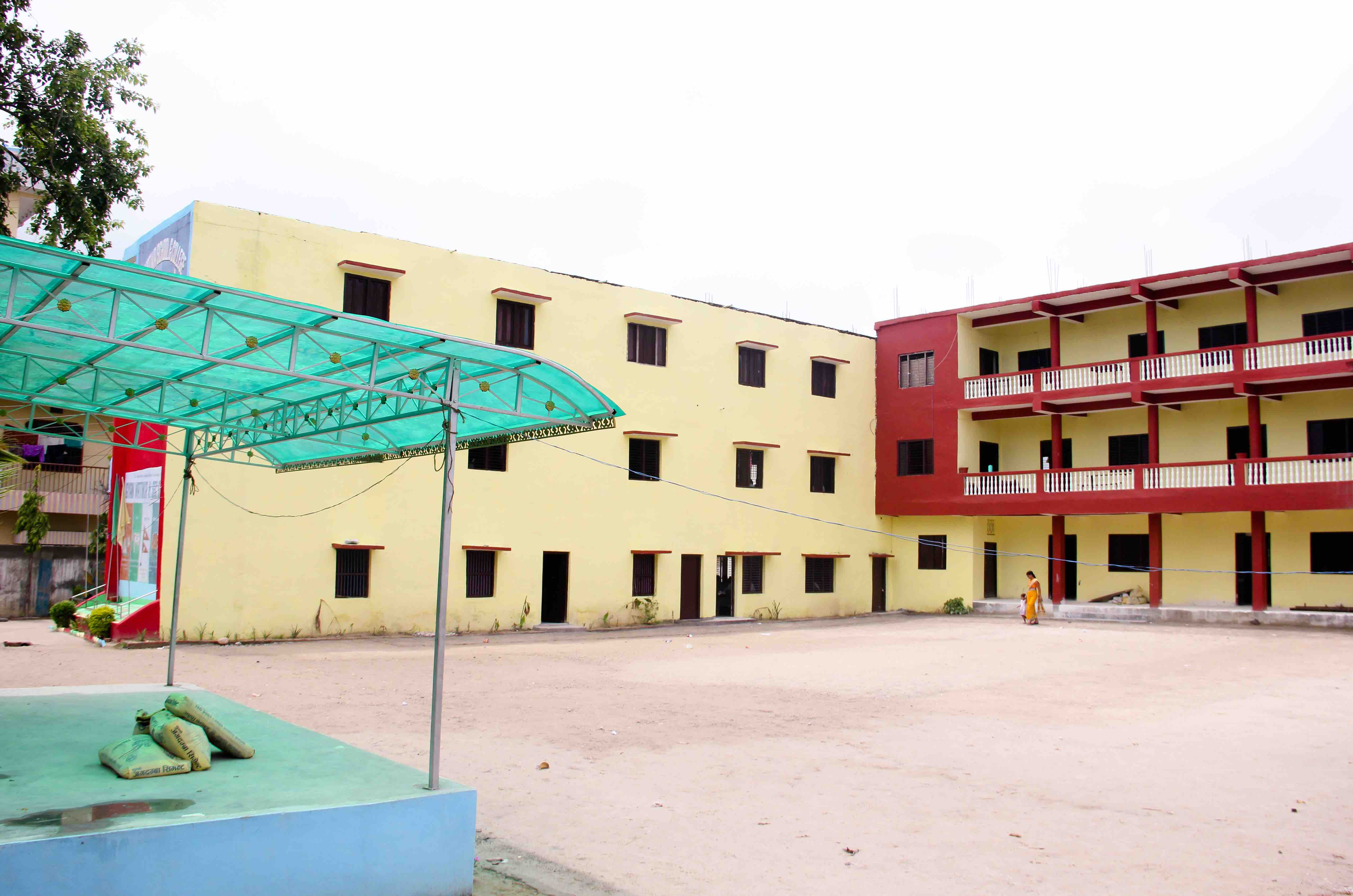
- Old Is Gold

Location
- Mudinepalli, Eluru District; Eluru District, Andhra Pradesh, 521325; India; 16.4196°N 81.1108°E

Information
- School type: Day School
- Denomination: INR, Rupees
- Opened: Since 1968
- School board: State Board
- School district: Eluru District
- Principal: Mr.R.V.Nagaraju Garu Since:- 2024 till Present
- Language: English, Telugu, Hindi, Sanskrit
- Hours in school day: 8 Hrs
- Classrooms: 42
- Campus size: ~3 acres (12,000 m^{2})
- Affiliation: Secondary School Certificate, AP Board

Little Flower English Medium High School, Mudinepalli was the first English Medium High School in the undivided Krishna, East & West Godavari Districts, of Andhra Pradesh, India with day schooling and residential since 1968. Little Flower English Medium High School was established and Founded by Late Shri.Balusu Sri Satya Siva Prasad Rao Garu in the year 1968 at Mudinepalli, Krshna District.Late Shri.Balusu Sri Satya Siva Prasad Rao Garu had Founded the school with the motto to provide high quality education to children who hail from inner rural areas in the year 1968.

== Academics ==
Little Flower English Medium High School is a day cum boarding school with making English as the medium of instruction to students in school.

== Extra-curricular activities ==
=== Competitions ===
Little Flower English Medium High School students have won several prizes in District, State & National level competitions both academically and in extra curricular activities like Karate, Singing, Dancing, Drawing & Sport activities. Competitions includes Bhagavad Gita sloka recital contest, Science and Math talent test, Karate Competitions and many other talent tests.
