= WMO English Academy, Karunyapuram =

School in Kerala, India

Location
- Kerala; India; 11.6348°N 76.1177°E

Information
- Religious affiliation: Wayanad Muslim Orphanage
- School district: Wayanad
- School number: 04936-203778,206980
- School code: KL06633
- Chairman: MA Mohammed Jamal
- Principal: Sabira Abooty
- Grades: L.K.G - 12th Grade
- Accreditation: Central Board of Secondary Education
- Affiliation: 930083
- Website: https://wmoenglishacademy.com/

WMO English Academy, Karunyapuram under Wayanad Muslim Orphanage is an educational institution located in Muttil village at Wayanad district Headquarters Kalpetta.It was the First Center Board of Secondary Education-Certified English school in Wayanad. This school is a member of Wayanad Sahodaya Schools Complex.

== Infrastructure ==
- Digital Class Rooms
- Seminar Hall
- Library
- Computer Lab
- Physics Lab
- Chemistry Lab
- Play Ground
- Public Address System
- Transport Facilities
- Residential Facilities for Girls & Boys
- Children's Park

Medical Care

The school has an equipped first aid system. Each student undergoes medical examinations once in a year conducted.

Guidance and Counseling

The school provide counseling and guidance under the care of expert counselors and psychologists, Parent Effective Training (PET), Career Guidance Programs, Motivation Classes, Life Enrichment Programs as well as residential camps for the multi-dimensional growth of the students.

Boarding Facility

Separate hostel for boys and girls are available on first-come, first-served basis at the WMO hostels. Both boys and girls hostels have their own male and female wardens respectively. There is an orphanage also running under the management near the boarding facility.
