= H. B. Kapadia New High School =

The H. B. Kapadia New High school

Location
- Ahmedabad, Gujarat; India; 23.022°N 72.522°E

Information
- Type: Primary and secondary (1-10); co-educational higher secondary (11th and 12th Grade)
- Established: 1956 - Shahibaugh Branch 2001 - Memnagar Branch 2007 - Prernatirth Branch 2013 - Chhatral Branch 2014 - Chandkheda Branch
- Founder: Hiralal Bapulal Kapadia
- Chairman: Muktak Navnitlal Kapadia
- Grades: 1–12
- Website: hbkapadia.com

The H. B. Kapadia New High school is the group of schools located in Ahmedabad and Gandhinagar. The H. B. Kapadia is named after the founder of this school Hiralal Bapulal Kapadia. It provides both Gujarati as well as English medium education facilities. It also provides higher secondary school education in commerce as well as science streams. The chhatral branch is affiliated with Central Board of Secondary Education while the others are affiliated with Gujarat Secondary and Higher Secondary Education Board.

== History ==
The first branch of The H. B. Kapadia New High school was established in 1926 at GheeKanta. Then the shahibaugh Branch was established in 1956 by Hiralal Bapulal Kapadia.

== See also ==
- Sheth Chimanlal Nagindas Vidyalaya
