= F.R. Islamia Inter College =

F. R. Islamia Inter College
- Bareilly, Uttar Pradesh; India

Information
- Type: Government
- Established: 1930
- Principal: Major Javed Khalid
- Faculty: 74
- Enrollment: 2484
- Colors: White and Silver
- Nickname: Islamia Inter College
- Affiliations: UPMSP

F. R. Islamia Inter College is an intermediate college located in Bareilly, Uttar Pradesh. It was established in 1930 by the government of India.

== Campus ==
Students from 1 to 12 are taught in this college. The present student strength of the college is approximately 2484. Major Javed Khalid is the college's principal.

== Affiliation ==
F. R. Islamia Inter College is affiliated with the Uttar Pradesh State Board of High School and Intermediate Education.

== See also ==
Hartmann College
