= Seth Anandram Jaipuria School Lucknow =

Information
- Motto: Empower, enthuse and excel
- Established: 2016
- Principal: Mrs. Poonam Kochitty
- Staff: 75+
- Faculty: 55+
- Gender: Co-educational
- Age: 3+ to 16
- Enrollment: 3000+
- Language: English
- Classrooms: 50+
- Colours: White, Grey
- Song: Tamso Maa Jyotirgarmya Jaipurians Chale
- Sports: Volleyball, Shooting Rang, Cricket, Archery Range, Football
- Mascot: SPARK
- Accreditation: CBSE
- Publication: ASPIRE
- Yearbook: QUEST
- Alumni: Vijay Krishna Acharya
- Website: jaipurialucknow.edu.in

Seth Anandram Jaipuria School, Lucknow (often called Jaipuria School, Lucknow) is a co-educational day and boarding private school from the Nursery to XII grades, located in the Sushant, Golf City, Lucknow. The school is affiliated to the Central Board of Secondary Education (CBSE), Delhi. - The Principal of the School is Poonam Kochitty. Seth Anandram Jaipuria School, Lucknow was inaugurated by Honorable Shri Akhilesh Yadav, Chief Minister, Uttar Pradesh, on 17 April 2016.

== Administration ==
The senior team as of 2024.

Headmistress - Junior School - Mrs. Shilpi Kumar
Principal - Mrs. Poonam Kochitty
Vice Principal - Junior School - Mrs. Monika Taneja Manaktalaa
Vice Principal - Senior School - Mr. Pankaj Rathore

== Special Features ==
The original Jaipuria School is Seth Anandram Jaipuria School, owned by Mr. Shishir Jaipuria. The school also has some features that are usually not available in other schools in Lucknow :

- Microsoft Showcase School
- Interactive Smart Classes with use of Educomputer
- Safe & Secure Premises with round the clock guards and security provisions
- Table Tennis
- Indoor Sporting Arenas with Swimming Pool Archery
- Badminton, Table Tennis and Cricket
- Playgrounds and Activity Rooms
- Well-equipped Science and Computer Laboratories
- Art & Craft room
- Indian Classical, Indian Modern and Western Music rooms
- State of the art teaching facilities. Each class room is equipped with Smart Interactive Board & TATA Edge's Digital Resource Materials
- Basic utilities such as round the clock clean water and electricity and lube
- Open Assembly area
- Well maintained sanitation facilities
- Splash Pool
- Multipurpose Hall

== Curriculum ==
The school offers national syllabus developed by the NCERT, New Delhi in the light of the new education policy. The school prepares students for:

- All India Secondary Examination (at the end of class X)
- All India Senior Secondary Certificate Examination (at the end of class XII)

== House system ==
The houses are Ganga, Narmada, Godavari & Krishna. Each house is supervised by a House incharge assisted by a team of teachers and office bearers of students’ council in managing the day to day commitment.

== Organisation ==
Mr. Shishir Jaipuria is the Chairman of Jaipuria Group of Educational Institutions comprising including 17 K-12 schools, 4 pre-schools and 2 business management institutions. As an industrialist, he is CMD, Ginni Filaments Ltd, an integrated traditional textile company that holds a large share of the technical textile market in India.

== Location ==
Seth Anandram Jaipuria School, Lucknow Pocket-3, Sector-D, Amar Shaheed Path, Golf City, Lucknow, Uttar Pradesh

== Notable alumni ==
- Vijay Krishna Acharya - Film Director
- Sanjay Gupta - MD, Dainik Jagran
- Gaurav Khanna - Indian television Actor
