= Visakha Valley School =

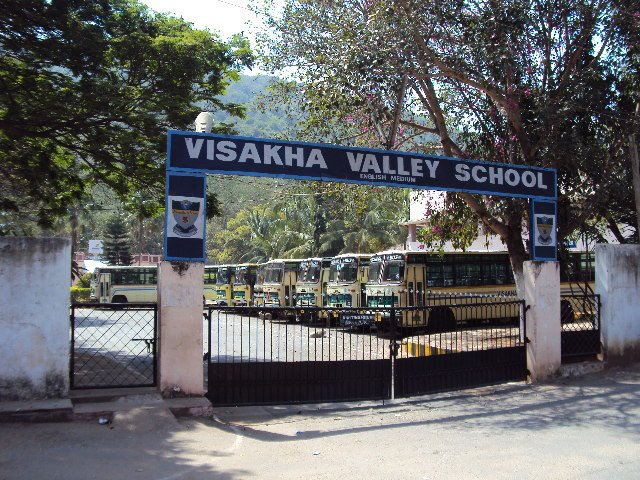
- The school in March 2012

Location
- Hanumanthawaka, Visakhapatnam, Andhra Pradesh; India; 17.762144°N 83.342643°E

Information
- Type: Coed; Private school
- Motto: Strive for excellence
- Established: 1968
- School board: Central Board of Secondary Education
- Superintendent: M Abhishikth Kishore, Visakhapatnam collector
- Principal: Dr Eshwari Prabhakar
- Grades: LKG–12
- Campus size: 133 acres (540,000 m^{2})

The Visakha Valley School (also known as VVS) is a school situated in Visakhapatnam, Andhra Pradesh, India. It is one of oldest schools in the city of Visakhapatnam.

== Student life ==
The campus covers 133 acres, with blocks for students of LKG and UKG, 1st to 5th, 6 to 9 and 10 to 12. There are two computer labs, one chemistry lab, biology lab, physics lab, English lab, social lab, and maths lab. There is a physical education room, basketball court, art room, music room, and a library.

The school has 14 buses for transportation of students, covering almost all the area in Visakhapatnam.

Visakha Valley School gives students an opportunity to take part in competitive exams like IMO, NCO and other Olympiads conducted by Science Olympiad foundation. The school celebrates days like Children's day, Telugu day, Sanskrit day, Hindi day and Air Force day. The school publishes a magazine named Madalasa.

It has a programme called S.Y.A (school year abroad) where foreigners interact with Indian students and learn their tradition and culture. The school students host them for a period of three months. The school has introduced IIT foundation classes to assure better ranks in competitive examinations. The school has NCC for boys and girls.

The school uniform is silver gray shirt and navy blue trousers/skirt and flaps of their house. On Fridays, the school uniform is a white shirt and white trousers/skirt with a striped tie and the house-colored overcoat.

=== Houses ===
The students are divided among four houses — Edison (blue), Newton (yellow), Raman (red) and Bhabha (green) — to provide competition. The houses have been named after the scientists Thomas Edison, Isaac Newton, C. V. Raman and Homi J. Bhabha. Trophies are given to students of houses based on their talents in sports and other co-curricular activities. The Newton house was at the lead until in 2010, when the Raman house won.

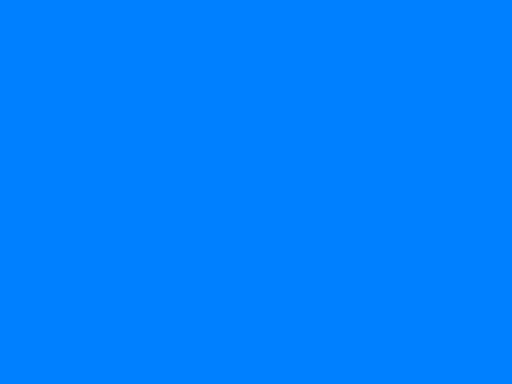
Edison

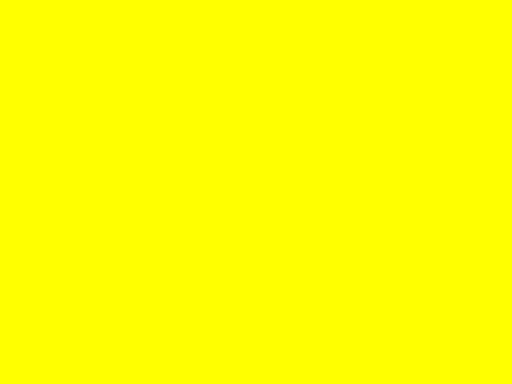
Newton

Raman

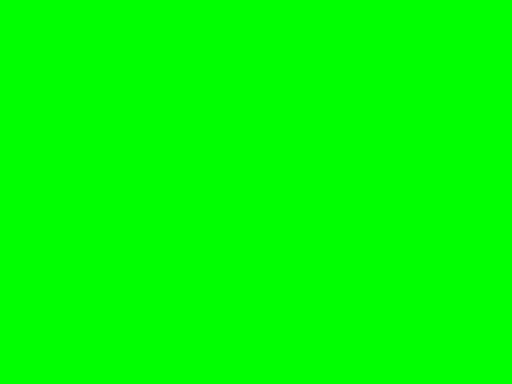
Bhabha

=== Student council ===
The student council of 2011

The students of classes 9th onward vote for students of 11th and 12th who take part in a three-week-long democratic election programme to become prefects (members of the [student council]). During the third week, all the participants deliver speeches to the voters. Then the voters choose their leader and vote in on the Friday of the third week.

Students are elected as captains of the four houses and the entire school. Once elected, the prefects are presented with starred flaps and special black jackets which they wear on Fridays. In case a prefect is found to be irresponsible or bullying, the head captain is questioned. Soon or later, the defaulter is suspended from the student council.

== Academics ==
Visakha Valley School runs the CBSE system of education with teaching from LKG to X + 2 in English medium.

The principal is Dr Eshwari Prabhakar; chairman is district collector, Sri Dr. A.Mallikarjun (IAS); vice principals are Amar Paul and G. Radha.

=== Model United Nations ===
The Model United Nations (generally referred to as MUN in the VVS) is an academic simulation of the United Nations that educates participants about current events, topics in international relations, diplomacy and the United Nations agenda. In an MUN conference, participants research a country, take on roles as diplomats, investigate international issues, debate, deliberate, consult, and then develop solutions to world problems. During a conference, participants employ communication and critical thinking skills to represent the policies of their country. These skills include public speaking, group communication, research, policy analysis, active listening, negotiating, conflict resolution, note taking, and technical writing.

During the 2011, the first MUN was established in India. The Delhi University Model United Nations saw some of the best MUNers across India participating in three UN Councils — General Assembly, ECOSOC, and Security Council. Soon after the establishment of DUMUN, some students of the VVS were enrolled into CHEMUN or Chennai Model United Nations conferences as diplomats representing their Nation or NGO in a simulated session of an organ (committee) of the United Nations, such as the Security Council or the General Assembly.

=== Pattern of education ===
The Visakha Valley School (VVS) is affiliated to the Central Board of Secondary Education in New Delhi under the 10+2 pattern, and has 14 levels of education from LKG-UKG, grades 1 to 10, 11 and 12. The tenth grade, known as Standard X (Std. X), is very important. After the completion of class 10, the student sits the national board exams. The percentage scored in Class X decides what a student can opt for in Class XI (Science/Commerce/Arts).

The grade gains even more importance as in many parts of India the number of seats for Class XI is generally lower than the number of students who pass out Standard X. Upon completion of class 12, students sit for the entrance examinations for their chosen course of study and university or to the universities through the AIIMS, NEET, AIPMT, JEE-ADVANCED, JEE-MAINS, etc.

== History ==
Cdr. Almaida, with the support of the district collector, started a school on the outskirts of the city and called it the 'Visakha Valley School'. When he retired, Cdr. P.A. Moses was selected for the principal's post. He took over in January 1971 and continued till April 1977. By then, it became a full-fledged school offering CBSE syllabus.

The foundation was laid in 1968, by the district collector of Visakhapatnam Shri Abid Hussain. It was started by The Visakha Educational Society under Societies Registration Act.

== Events ==
=== Sports day ===
The Visakha Valley School celebrates sports day once every four years. They are usually held in the warmer seasons, either at the beginning or towards the end of the academic year. In the Visakha Valley School, which uses a house system, a traditional feature of British schools, and schools in the Commonwealth, the competition is between the houses, which is especially brought out during sporting events such as an inter-house sports day. Games include sprints and longer races for all age groups, and egg and spoon races. Three legged races are run as well as sack races and parent and child races. Sports days in the Visakha Valley School are usually held with the District Collector as the chief guest and Sailaja Rao as the guest of honour. During these programmes, the principal of the school reads the school annual report.

=== Teachers' Day ===
5 September, the birthday of the second President of India, academic philosopher Dr. Sarvepalli Radhakrishnan is celebrated as Teachers' Day. It is considered a "celebration" day, where teachers and students report to school but the usual activities and classes are replaced by activities of celebration, thanks, and remembrance. The responsibility of teaching is taken up by the senior students to show appreciation for their teachers. Students come dressed in colorful sarees and welcome the teachers with flowers and garlands. Competitive sporting activities are conducted between the teachers and the students. The early morning assembly, which is usually done by the students, is done by the teachers on this day. For the rest of the day, most teachers act as students. No classes are held.

== See also ==
- Delhi Public School
- St Aloysius' Anglo-Indian High School
