= Candor National Public School =

Private school in Andhra Pradesh, India

Location
- Survey No. 10/5B, Mamandur Village, Ithepalli Post, Chandragiri; Tirupati, Andhra Pradesh; India; 13.5759°N 79.2755°E

Information
- Type: Private school
- Motto: Preparing for Life
- Established: 2021; 5 years ago
- Founder: Dr. Suresh Reddy
- Chairman: Dr. Suresh Reddy
- Principal: A. Naga Swetha
- Gender: Co-educational
- Enrollment: approximately 800 (2025-2026)
- Student to teacher ratio: 25:1
- Language: English
- Annual tuition: ₹85,000 to ₹2,50,000
- Affiliation: CBSE
- Website: candornps.edu.in
- Last updated: October 20th 2026

Candor National Public School (CNPS) is a private, co-educational school located in Tirupati, Andhra Pradesh, India. Established in 2021, the institution offers primary, secondary, and higher secondary education.

== History ==
The school was founded in 2021 by Dr. Suresh Reddy under the Saketh Educational Trust. Reddy, who also serves as the chairperson, established the institution to provide national-standard education within the Chittor district and surrounding regions.

== Academics ==
Candor National Public School is affiliated with the Central Board of Secondary Education (CBSE). The school is taught in English. The school educates children from Nursery all the way through Grade 12 (which is considered Senior secondary education).
