= Tiny Harts School =

School in Jammu and Kashmir, India

Coordinates: 34°3′45″N 74°46′56″E

Information
- Motto: Build ye High Build Ye True
- Established: Early 1990s
- Language: English

Tiny Harts School is a private school situated in the valley of Srinagar, Jammu and Kashmir. It is a coeducational school recognised by the J&K State Board of School Education.

The school was established in the early 1990s by Mrs. Hart, who is currently the chairperson of the school. Initially, it was located at Raj Bagh, Srinagar, Jammu and Kashmir, but later it shifted to Tengpora, Bye Pass, Srinagar.

Tiny Harts School is an English-medium school, but most interactions are in Urdu between teachers and students, as well as among students themselves.

Over the past few years, Tiny Harts School has raised its profile in sports. The cricket and football teams from the school have played in several tournaments, and the school organizes cross-country runs and trekking.

The school is focused primarily on academics, giving less attention to co-curricular activities.

The motto of the school is "Build ye High Build Ye True".
