= Parkash Memorial Deaf & Dumb School =

Specialist school in Ropar, Panjab

Coordinates: 30.9562°N 76.5126°E

Parkash Memorial Deaf & Dumb School, also referred to as the PM Deaf and Dumb School, is a school for deaf-mute children in the city of Rupnagar in the Panjab. It is run by the Parkash Memorial Deaf and Dumb Handicapped Welfare Society [Regd.], and Mrs Adarsh Sharma is the current principal of the school. Panjabi is the primary language of the school.

Established in 2007, the school has 178 students, including 75 girls. Affiliated with the Punjab School Education Board, the school provides education up to 10th class and also some courses.
