= Sarang school =

Location
- Attappady, Palakkad district, Kerala; India; 11.0738°N 76.6525°E

Information
- Established: 1982
- Founder: Gopalakrishnan Sarang; Vijayalakshmi Sarang
- Website: dakshinasarang.com

Sarang is an alternative school on a hill top started by a teacher couple, Gopalakrishnan and Vijayalakshmi in Agali Panchayath in Attappady, Palakkad district, Kerala, India. The school's curriculum includes organic farming, art forms and environmental conservation among other subjects.

== History ==
Sarang School was established in 1982, on forest land stretching to about 1 acre, on the foothills of Attappady, in the district of Palakkad, in the south Indian state of Kerala. The school was founded by Gopalakrishnan, a school teacher from Idukki district and his wife, Vijayalakshmi, 60, who also had been a teacher. They quit their jobs and started the school with the intention of introducing an alternative way of education, discarding a regular curriculum, text book based education, syllabus and examinations to focus more on lifestyle education where farming, cooking and other life skills were given prominence. Together with the students, they planted the barren forest foothills and built check dams for conserving water. However, due to financial constraints, the couple had to close the school after two years. However, assisted by the efforts of their son, Gautham, they were able to reopen the school.

== Overview ==
Sarang School now sits on a land extending to 12 acres. All the structures in the campus have been built using materials available locally, such as mud, bamboo and wood. The school runs on solar energy, the cooking is done in the conventional way of fire stove, and all the waste is composted to make manure. It occasionally hosts interns from other universities such as Azim Premji University.

The couple, along with their son, and two daughters, Kannaki and Unniyarcha, and their families, live in the campus.
