= Khimat =

Village is Gujarat, India

Khimat is a Village in Dhanera Taluka in Banaskantha district of Gujarat State, India. It is located 50 KM towards North from District headquarters Palanpur. It is situated 17 km away from sub-district headquarter Dhanera. The chief occupation of people is agriculture. It Pin code is 385545 and postal head office is Khimat.

== Nearby Places ==
Mewada (5 KM), Virol (6 KM), Viruna (6 KM), Runi (8 KM), Vithodar (7 KM) are nearby villages. The nearby towns are Dhanera (17.3 KM), Deesa (31.6 KM), Palanpur (59.7 KM), Sanchore (58.2 KM), Tharad (62 KM).

== Education ==
There are several primary and 2 nos higher secondary schools in villages

1. T.M.S. Jogani Jagruti Primary. School
2. Varniya Khimant Primary School
3. Goliya Rabarivas Khimat Primary School
4. Umedpura Khimat Primary School
5. Rampura Khimat Primary School
6. T.M.S. Jogani Vidhyalaya
7. Smt. K.D.R. Purohit Gayatri Vidhyalaya
