= Shri Marikamba High School, Sirsi =

High school in Uttara Kannada district, Karnataka

Shri Marikamba High School, Sirsi - Established in 1884 is one of the oldest high schools in Uttar Kannada district, India.

This school was started in 1884 as Anglo Vernakuls School and it was later renamed as Shri Marikamba High School after the Power Goddess Marikamba Temple situated there. The school was under the control of the local municipal administration.

In 1971, Shri Marikamba High School came under a new Government administration and was renamed as Shri Marikamba Government High School. In 1983, the Pre-University (PU) courses were added to the school and again the school was renamed as Shri Marikamba Government Pre-University College. In 1993, science courses were added. This has 1600 students (21 sections) in high school sections and 750 students in the PU Board Section. English medium is added along with Kannada medium.

== Notable alumni ==
- Ramakrishna Hegde - (1926 – 2004) politician and former Chief Minister of Karnataka
