= Railway schools in India =

Schools administered by Ministry of Railways in India

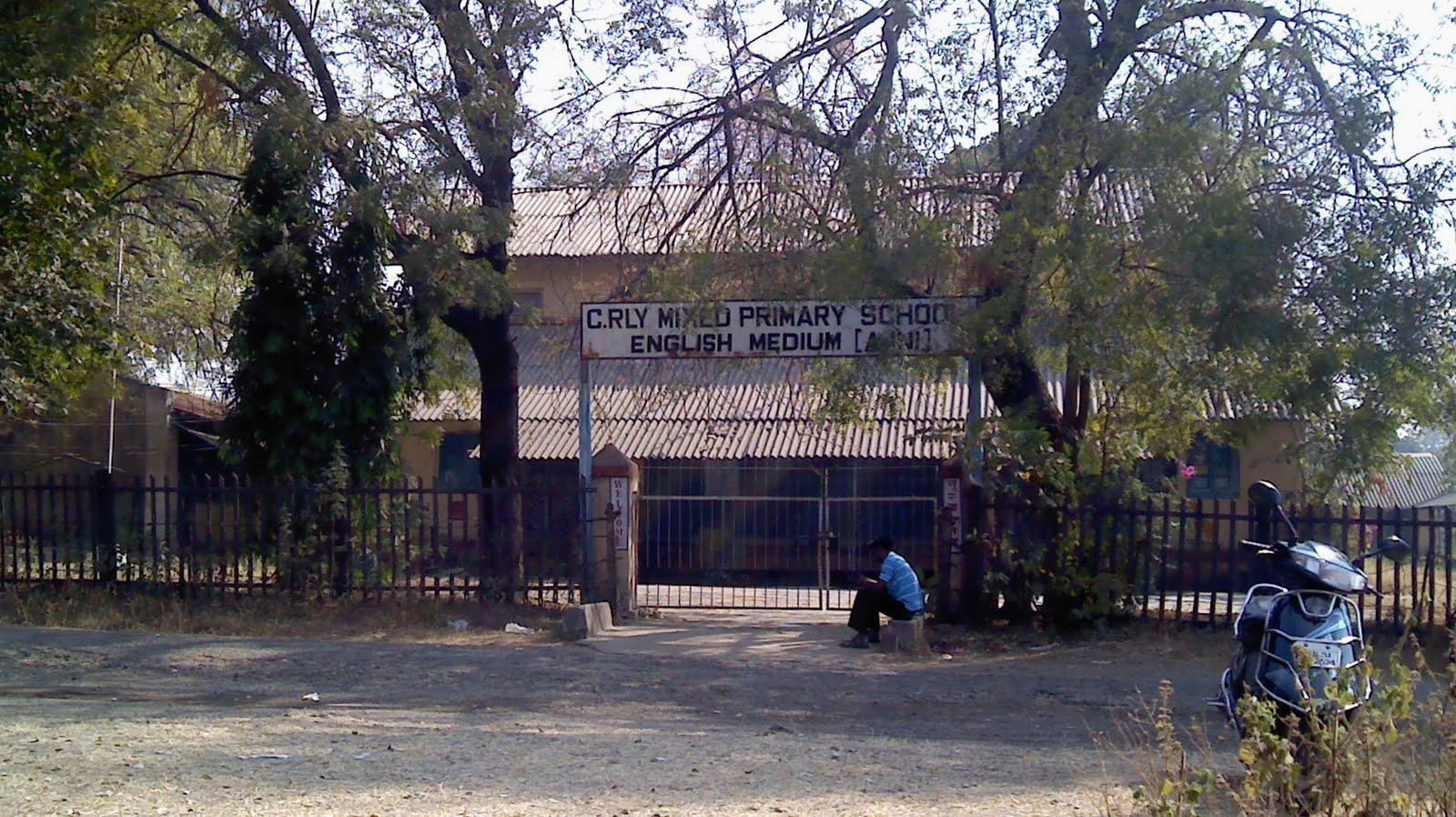
- A railway school in Nagpur

Information
- Type: Open
- Established: 1873; 153 years ago
- Authority: Ministry of Railways

Railway schools are a chain of educational institutions in India run by the federal government, under the aegis of Ministry of Railways. These schools cater the education needs for the wards of railway and non-railway employees. The schools were established by the British.

In India, there about 114 such schools are present in Andhra Pradesh, Assam, Bihar, Chhattisgarh, Gujarat, Jharkhand, Karnataka, Kerala, Madhya Pradesh, Maharashtra, Nagaland, Odisha, Rajasthan, Tamil Nadu, Telangana, Uttarakhand, Uttar Pradesh and West Bengal.

== History ==
As the British Empire started colonizing countries in Asia and Africa, they brought resources and technology to comfort themselves — thereby seeding a big Industrial Revolution. To move the harvested and manufactured goods from one place to another, railway transportation brought bigger changes. Simultaneously, the colonists came forward to provide education for the members and staffs working in the railway. And thus started mushrooming of such schools: Wherever railway lines were laid, stations were opened and railway factories and workshops were established. In the late 1850s, these schools were part of larger railway colonies in which schools, leisure facilities, and domestic spaces were created for the residing Europeans to enjoy middle-class life.

One of the earliest railway colonies was in Jamalpur, Bihar. In this colony, European "Children were educated for future employment or to be railway wives at a primary level in the local school." One of the earliest railway schools was Oak Grove School at Jharipani, Mussoorie in India. In Tamil Nadu, railway schools were built between 1890 and the 1900s for children of British railway employees. Most were built following Victorian-style architecture. With the constant expansion of the railway network, such schools were established across the country. The schools were later opened to non-railway people.

On 30 April 2018, India's Southern Railway announced that it was shutting down all of its railway schools. The decision would affect 6,800 students in eight schools in Tamil Nadu and one school in Palakkad, Kerala. On 16 May 2018, Southern Railway issued an announcement that railway schools may continue to admit students. Some of the schools were allowed to operate with conditions that classes included 15 to 20 wards of railway employees.

== Criticisms ==
Some have criticized the railway schools created by the British as a way to separate British people, culture, and ways of life from Indian culture and influence. Some historians and philosophers (Michel Foucault) have criticized these schools and colonies as sites that intended to "other" Indians and Indian culture by emphasizing national, racial, and class differences. The construction of these railway colonies and schools was described by James Broun-Ramsay, 1st Marquess of Dalhousie as one of the "three great engines of social improvement," that would impact "every other improvement whatever, both physical and moral."
