= G.U.P.S, Padinhattummuri =

Location
- Kerala; India
- 11.3282°N 75.7838°E

G.U.P.S, Padinhattummuri or Government Upper Primary School, Padinhattummuri or Kakkodi GUPS is situated at Kizhakkummuri in Kakkodi panchayat. Kakkodi is a panchayat in the outskirts of Kozhikode Corporation. The school comes under Chevayur subdistrict of Kozhikode.

The school was established in 1912 and started functioning as early as 1912 using the land donated by a house named "Chalil Tharavad". K.C. Gopalan Nair of "Chalil Tharavad" is the founder of this school. In 1958, this school was upgraded as higher elementary school and Std. VII was sanctioned. In 1961-62, the school came under the Kerala Govt. and was renamed as G.U.P.S, Padinhattummuri. The Government, through acquisition, possessed 0.5 hector land for expansion works of the school and the acquisition proceedings were completed in 1972. In 1978, the school was functioned in two shifts. Later in 1998-99, a new building with two class rooms was constructed. Further, in 1999-2000 three classroom building was built and a cluster resource centre under Kerala Sarva Shiksha Abhiyan (KSSA) was also constructed. Infrastructure expansion continued in 2000s also with a four classroom building opened on 8 November 2005.

The school completed 100 years in operation on 9 January 2012. The centenary celebrations were inaugurated by the Minister of Education Kerala, Janab P.K.Abdurabb on 9 January 2012 at the school premises.
