= Pragya Academy, Jorhat =

Junior College in India

- Motto: "We Dream Because We Dare "
- Type: Private
- Established: 2010
- Rector: Dr. Dinesh Chandra Boruah
- Principal: Dr. Mrinmoy Goswami
- Location: Jorhat, Assam, India; 26.763168°N 94.204549°E
- Nickname: Pragya

Pragya Academy is a Junior College in Jorhat of Assam, India.

Pragya Academy is a co-educational institution, in a self-contained campus with all necessary infrastructural facilities. It is situated at Baruah Chariali. This institution is run by Pragya Academy Society registered under the Society Act of 1860. Pragya Academy is a Junior College of Science, recognized by the Assam Higher Secondary Education Council.

== History ==
It was established in 2010.

== Academics ==
The Academy sprovide two year higher secondary courses in science stream under Assam Higher Secondary Education Council. The Academy concentrates on the higher secondary syllabus while preparing students for state level and All India entrance examinations for graduate professional courses such as JEE (Mains & Advanced), AIIMS, NEET, NEST, and Assam CEE.

== Achievement ==
The college is a pioneer institution for the region. The college gained recognition in 2016 when student Vaishali Dutta secured the 10th position in the higher secondary examination conducted by AHSEC.

In the same year, 79 out of 85 students secured distinction in the HS finals, while 21 students cracked the JEE mains exam.

In 2018, students Sudarshan Singh Sandhu and Pragya Priya Borah took 5th and 7th positions in AHSEC '18. 73 students out of 94 passed with distinction; 7 earned stars and 14 passed in 1st division.
