= Delhi Public School, Vijayawada =

Public school in Andhra Pradesh, India

Delhi Public School, Vijayawada also known as DPS VJA, is a K–12 co-ed English-medium school in Vijayawada, Andhra Pradesh, India. The school is affiliated with the Central Board of Secondary Education, New Delhi from nursery to class XII, and is one of the core schools of the Delhi Public School Society.

== Achievements and awards ==
- Best School Award for the fifth consecutive year in Andhra Pradesh,
- 19th place in all over India in the day-cum-boarding schools ranking 2018-19 by Education World.
