= New R. S. J. Public School =

- Logo of New R. S. J. Public School

Location
- Ustapur - Mahmoodabad, Chhatnag Road; Jhusi; Prayagraj, Uttar Pradesh; India; 25.407532°N 81.918885°E (School located in Chhatnag, Jhusi) 25.426997°N 81.911375°E (School located in Vasant Vihar, Jhusi) 25.384218823486762°N 82.07438541328996°E (School located in Saidabad, Prayagraj)

Information
- School type: Private
- Motto: Forward Ever
- Established: 26 March 2001
- School board: CBSE
- Principal: Suman Jaiswal
- Headmaster: Arun Raha
- Grades: Nursery–Grade 12
- Enrollment: more than 2,500 (as of 2013)
- Average class size: 40
- Hours in school day: 6 hours (8:00 am – 2:00 pm)
- Campus: Rural
- Campus size: 2.9 acres (1.2 ha)
- Houses: 4: red, yellow, blue, green
- Colours: Maroon; White; Black
- Song: "We belong to New R. S. J. P. S."
- Affiliation number (Chhatnag Branch): 2131041
- School Code (Chhatnag Branch): 54507
- Affiliation number (Saidabad Branch): 2133584

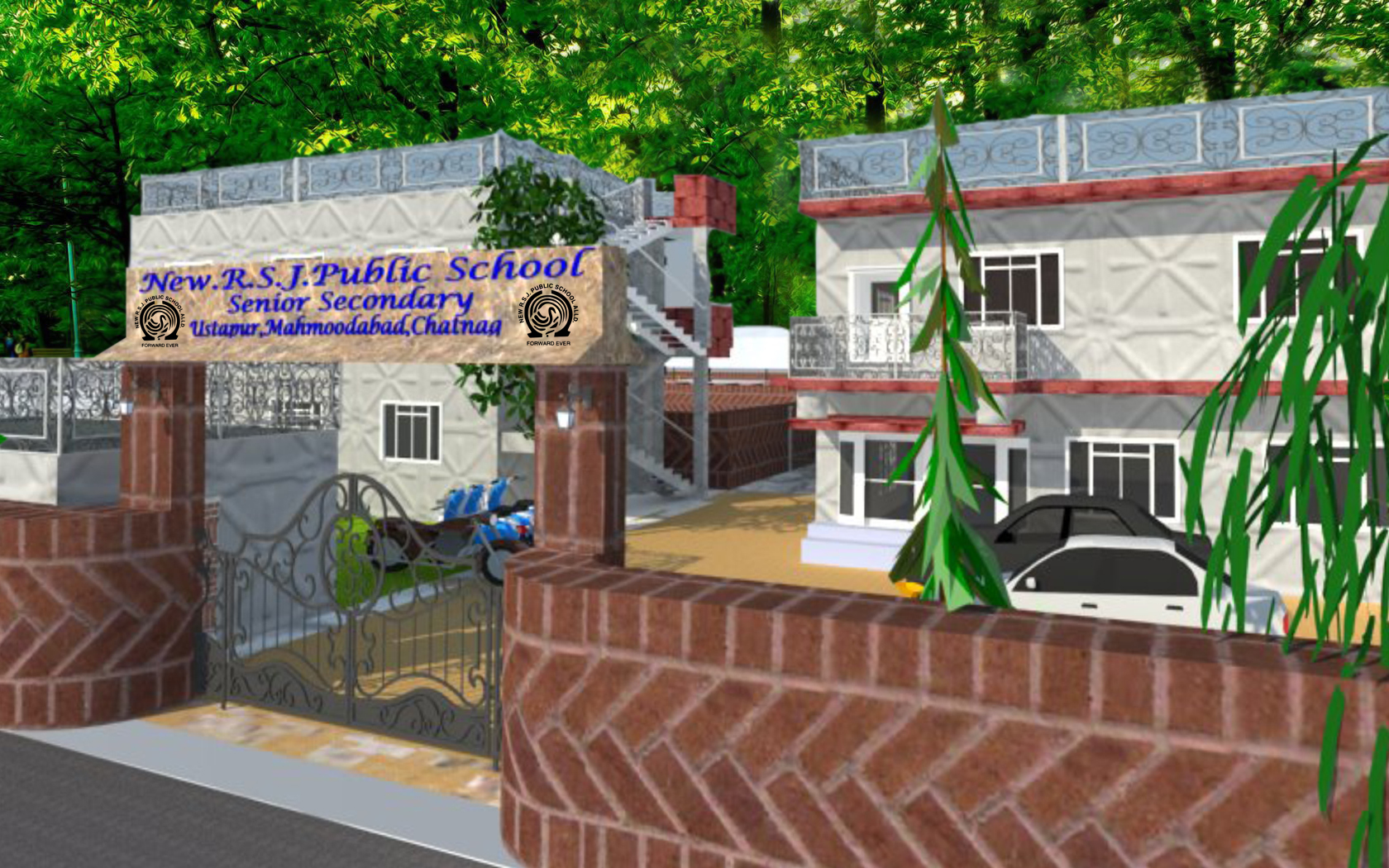
Front of school, image created in Google Sketch by a student

New R. S. J. Public School (initialised as NRSJPS, the abbreviation standing for Recreational Study Junction), is a secular co-educational English medium private school located in Jhusi, Prayagraj, India.

== School ==
The school branch at Chhatnag runs from Class Nursery to Class Twelve. A branch at Vasant Vihar, Jhusi, Allahabad, runs from Class Nursery to Class Five. The third branch of the school was established in 2016 at Saidabad, Prayagraj.

The school has a house system of four houses (red, yellow, blue and green), which compete in events including an annual three-day sports contest.

== Campus ==
The school campus at Chhatnag covers an area of 2.937 acres (1.189 ha). The campus features a playground with an area of 9250 square meters, an 800 m track, and a basketball court. For student safety and security, the school has a single gate entry/exit as well as modern fire detection and suppression equipment.

The school has its own fleet of buses, each with a driver, conductor, mobile phone, and fire-extinguisher.

The school at Chhatnag is divided into three wings: a junior school wing (Class Nursery to Class U.K.G.), a middle school wing (Class 1 to class 8), and a senior school wing (Class 9 to Class 12).

== Facilities ==
The school has laboratories for computer science, mathematics, physics, chemistry, biology and social studies. The library, which has separate junior and senior sections and is divided into sections by focus, has a total of 3,500 books, 300 reference books, two periodicals, and four magazines. Students have access to at least 4 newspapers every day. A language lab, including audiovisual materials, operates in the library.

Classrooms are equipped with interactive whiteboards. The school has a language lab in the library, art classes including dance (Indian and Western), music (Indian and Western), theater, and performing arts; a bookstore and stationery shop; and an infirmary. The school also conducts medical check-ups. There are school trips, and an annual function which has included dramatic and dance performances and a model parliament.

=== Laboratories ===
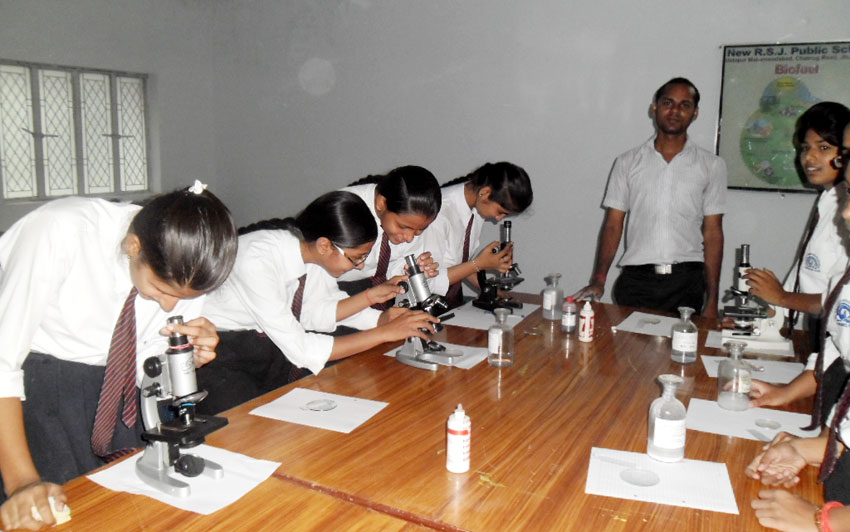
Biology lab

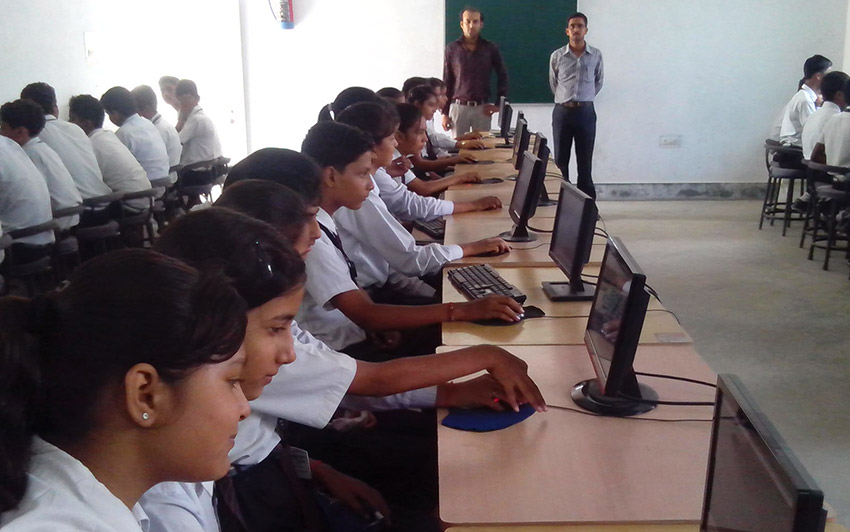
Computer lab

=== School buildings and grounds ===
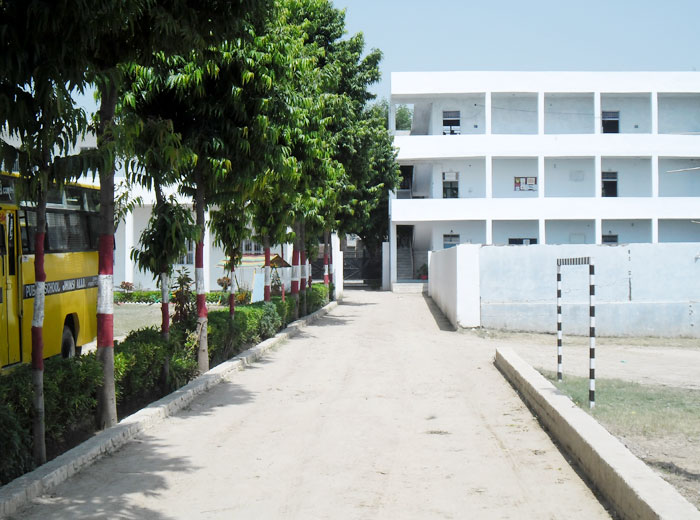
Entrance drive

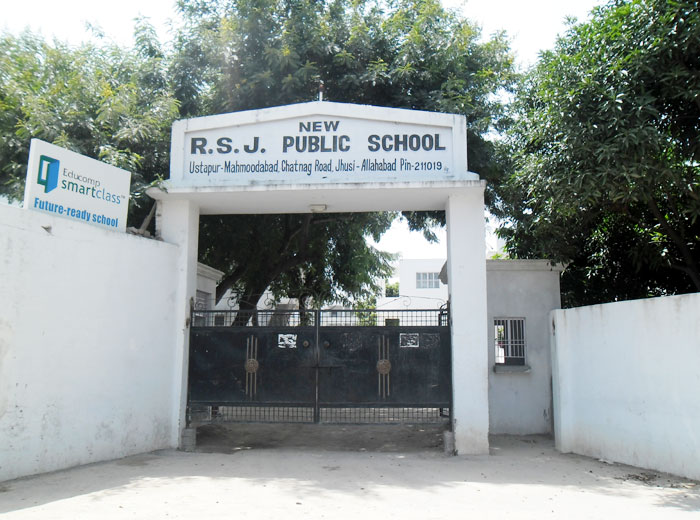
Main gate

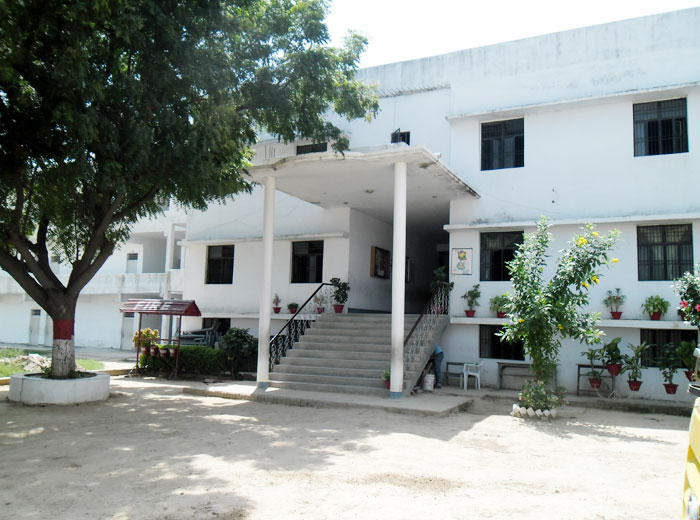
Class 1-8 Building

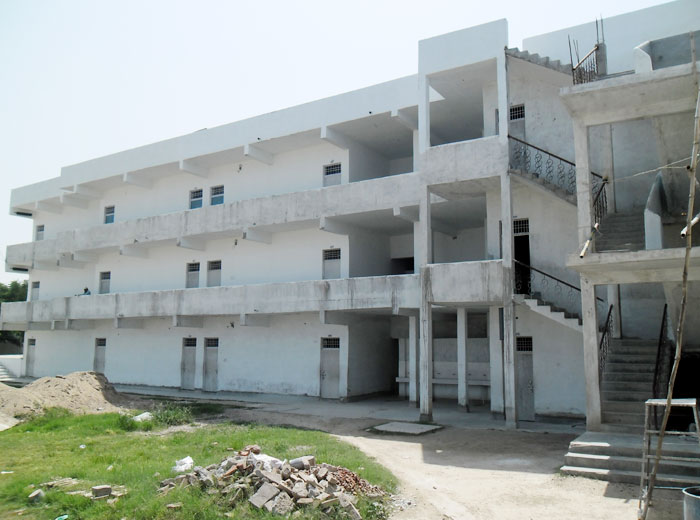
Class 9-12 Building 1

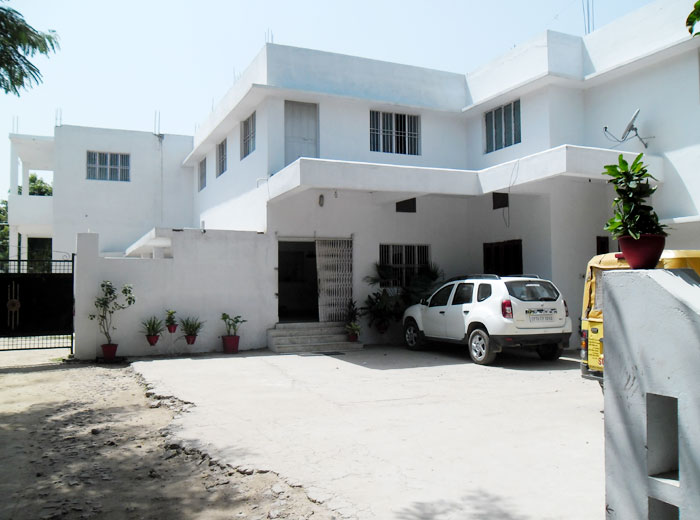
Administrative offices

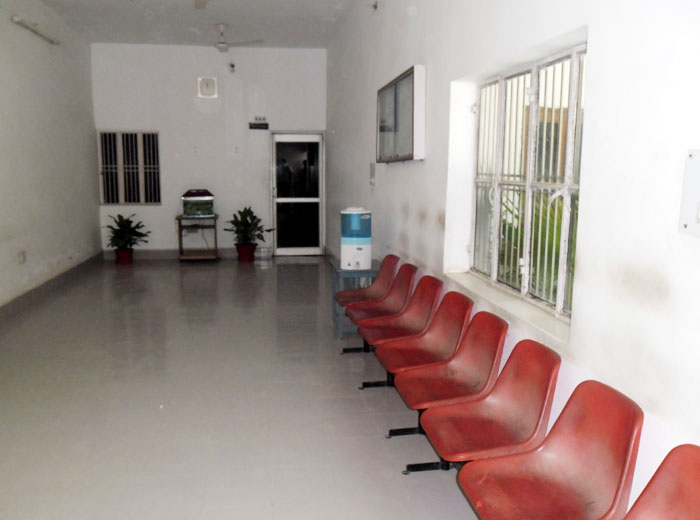
Parents' waiting area

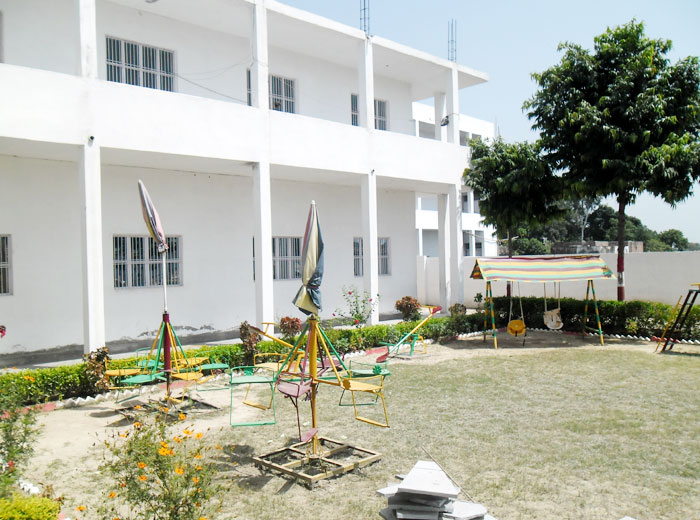
Junior Wing and playground

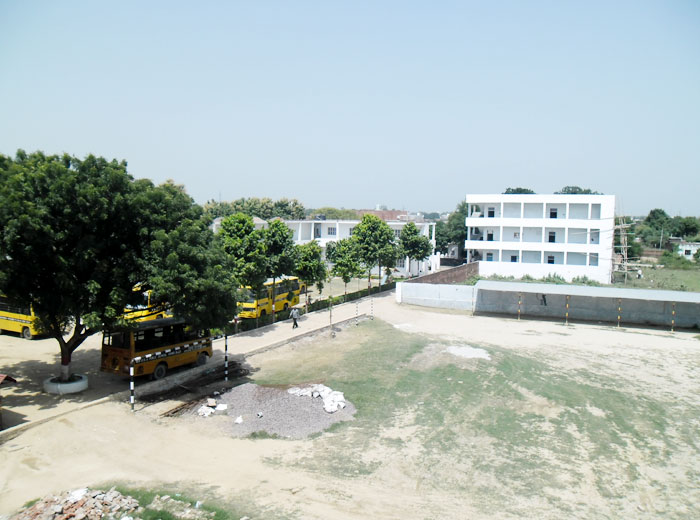
Overview of campus

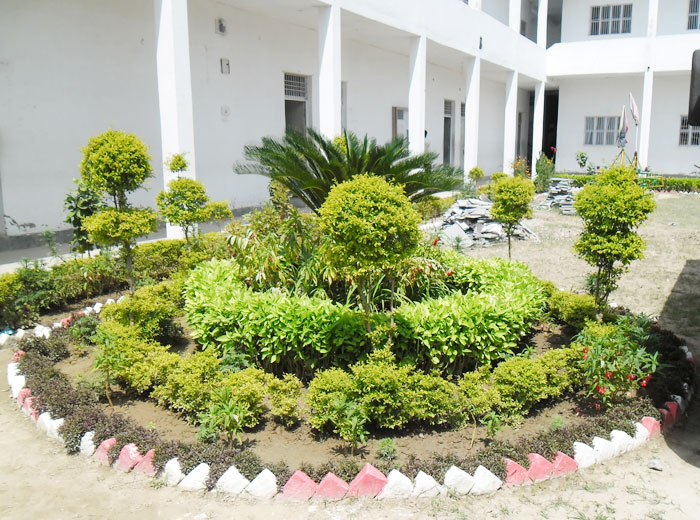
Plantings

== Sports ==
The school offers basketball, badminton, football, and cricket, and has a 200-metre athletic track. Taekwondo is taught for self-defence, and instruction in yoga is also provided.
