= Swami Janki Sharan =

Swami Janki Sharan Public School is a privately owned institution in the Raebareli district (UP-India) that has been educating students from nursery to 12th grade since 1984. The school is affiliated with the CBSE in New Delhi. It is located near the Raebareli District Hospital on the Kutchehri road and is one of the esteemed schools of the city. The school was named after great philosopher and religious personality Swami Janki Saran. Swamiji was a Sanskrit scholar and a 'saint' of high reputation. Founded and managed by (in its early times) by Late Karan Bahadur Singh.

The managing-director of the school is Mr. Ramesh Bahadur Singh and the Principal (Raebareli branch) is Dr. Beena Tiwari. Ramesh Bahadur Singh is helped and supported by Mr. Agraj Singh, Secretary Administration and Mr. Anuj Singh, Secretary Finance.

The S.J.S. Raebareli acts as main branch/ head school for S.J.S. Group of Institutions.

The school has its branches at Lalganj, Unchachar, Salon, Lucknow, Bachcharawan, Gauriganj, Bhaon, Kilauli, Gurbaxganj and at many more places in Uttar Pradesh. The school is currently run by S.J.S. Public School Society, Indira Nagar Vistar Yojna, Sector-12, Lucknow. School is an English medium, co-educational, C.B.S.E. affiliated, residential, senior secondary school.

The vital aim of imparting modern education in school is based on a firm footing of rich Indian heritage and truly reflects in its motto, "Sa Vidya Ya Vimuktaye" taken from 'Vishnu Puran' meaning "True Knowledge Liberates the Self".

The official website of school is- sjspublicschool.com.

== Academics ==
The school offers mainly 2 streams to students of class 11th- science and commerce with varying subject combinations. Following are the subjects:

=== Science section ===
- Physics
- Chemistry
- Biology
- Maths

=== Commerce section ===
- Economics
- Business Studies
- Accountancy

English is a compulsory subject and as optional subject school offers Hindi and Physical Education. The Unchahar, Salon and Lalganj branches also run up to class 12th. The academic session consists of 12 calendar months which runs from 1 April to 31 March with 2 vacations in between. The school follows the CCE pattern of C.B.S.E. for classes up to 10th. The examination schedule is presented to all in the month of April or May.

The school is an active participant and performer in various co-curricular activities organised at national, state or district level by various organisations. The school has been a winner of C.B.S.E. East Zone Hockey Tournament many times in various categories of both girls and boys. School is a silver medallist of C.B.S.E. National Hockey Tournament.

The school has also won medals in Taekwondo and participated in Volleyball tournaments. At district level, school is emerging as a continuous winner of hockey tournaments organised by Motilal Nehru Stadium. It has also participated at district level lawn tennis tournament. School has also won the all-India group song competition organised by Bharat Vikas Parishad held at Bhubneshwar. School is a member of "Society for Promotion of Indian Classical Music And Culture amongst Youth" SPIC MACAY for Raerbareli Chapter and has been a delegate to its various Conclaves and Convocations.
