= Sundari Devi Saraswati Vidya Mandir =

- Bataha village Rosera (Samastipur), India

Information
- Enrollment: 1500
- Website: www.sdsvmbataha.org

Sundari Devi Saraswati Vidya Mandir is a residential school in the Bataha village, Samastipur, Bihar, India. It is an approved Sainik School. The school is about 60 miles (97 km) north of Patna, capital of Bihar; and serves about 5000 students aged from 5 to 16. It was founded by Ramswaroop Mahato, a well known Ophthamologist.

== History ==
sundari devi saraswati vidya mandir was founded in 1998 with around 200 students by Dr Ram Swaroop Mahto, who also originally came from the village. After leaving India and becoming an ophthalmologist in England, he decided to build a school to educate the people of his village. He also decide to build a medical college, but this dream would not be successful.

== Financial aid ==
Some of the children receive financial support from the Friends of Sundridevi, a British charitable organisation.
