= List of Kendriya Vidyalayas =

Kendriya Vidyalaya Sangathan
- India

Information
- Established: 15 December 1963
- School board: Central Board of Secondary Education (CBSE)
- Authority: Ministry of Education
- Website: http://www.kvsangathan.nic.in

The Kendriya Vidyalayas are a network of central government-overseen schools in India, formed under the aegis of the Ministry of Education, affiliated to the Central Board of Secondary Education (CBSE), headquartered in New Delhi. The functioning of these schools is overseen by the Kendriya Vidyalaya Sangathan which is an autonomous body under India's Ministry of Education.

This is a partial list of Kendriya Vidyalaya schools. The organisation started with 20 regimental schools in 1963 and as of December 2021 there are total of 1,247 schools: 1,244 in India and three abroad. A total of 1,437,363 students as of 13 December 2021 and 48,314 employees were on the rolls as of 20 January 2019. These are divided among 25 regions, each headed by a deputy commissioner.

== India ==
=== Bihar ===
- Kendriya Vidyalaya Maharajganj

=== Delhi ===
- Kendriya Vidyalaya Janakpuri

=== Goa ===
- Kendriya Vidyalaya Bambolim

=== Haryana ===
- Kendriya Vidyalaya, Military Station, Hisar
- Kendriya Vidyalaya, Rohtak

=== Jammu and Kashmir ===
- Kendriya Vidyalaya, Bantalab, Jammu

=== Karnataka ===
- Kendriya Vidyalaya, Hubli
- Kendriya Vidyalaya, Jalahalli West
- Kendriya Vidyalaya, Jalahalli East
- Kendriya Vidyalaya, Hebbal
- Kendriya Vidyalaya Karwar
- Kendriya Vidyalaya, Malleswaram

=== Kerala ===
- Kendriya Vidyalaya, Ernakulam
- Kendriya Vidyalaya, Kanjikode
- Kendriya Vidyalaya, Kayamkulam
- Kendriya Vidyalaya, Kollam
- Kendriya Vidyalaya, Pangode
- Kendriya Vidyalaya, Pattom

=== Madhya Pradesh ===
- Kendriya Vidyalaya No. 4, Gwalior

=== Maharashtra ===
- Kendriya Vidyalaya Ganeshkhind, Pune
- Kendriya Vidyalaya, IIT Powai, Mumbai

=== Tamil Nadu ===
- Kendriya Vidyalaya IIT Chennai

=== Telangana ===
- Kendriya Vidyalaya No. 1 AFA, Dundigal
- Kendriya Vidyalaya No. 2 AFA, Dundigal
- Kendriya Vidyalaya Bolarum
- Kendriya Vidyalaya Tirumalagiri

=== Uttar Pradesh ===
- Kendriya Vidyalaya New Cantt, Prayagraj
- Kendriya Vidayalaya Pandit Deen Dayal Upadhyay Nagar
- Kendriya Vidyalaya, Raebareli

== International ==
The three Kendriya Vidyalayas outside India are in Kathmandu, Moscow, and Tehran. They are situated inside Indian embassies in these countries, and their expenditures are borne by the Indian Ministry of External Affairs. They are intended for children of Indian embassy staff and other expatriate employees of the government of India, including the State Bank of India.

- Kendriya Vidyalaya, Kathmandu, Nepal
- Kendriya Vidyalaya, Moscow, Russian Federation
- Kendriya Vidyalaya Tehran, Iran
