= List of schools in Thiruvananthapuram district =

Thiruvananthapuram district in Kerala, India has a variety of schools affiliated to State education board, Central Board of Secondary Education (CBSE), Indian School Certificate Examination Board (ICSE), International Baccalaureate (IB) and International General Certificate of Secondary Education (IGCSE). Most of the ICSE/ISC schools in Kerala are found in Trivandrum, which makes Trivandrum city an educational hub in Kerala.

== A ==
- Attakulangara School, Government Central High School.

== C ==
- Chinmaya Vidyalaya, Manacaud
- Chinmaya Vidyalaya, Kunnumpuram
- Chinmaya Vidyalaya, Vazhuthacaud
- Christ Nagar School, Thiruvananthapuram, Kowdiar

== G ==
- Government Model Boys Higher Secondary School, Thycaud
- G. V. Raja Sports School, Aruvikkara

== H ==
- Holy Angels' Convent Trivandrum

== K ==
- Kendriya Vidyalaya, Akkulam
- Kendriya Vidyalaya, Pallippuram, Thiruvananthapuram
- Kendriya Vidyalaya, Pangode
- Kendriya Vidyalaya, Pattom
- Kendriya Vidyalaya, SAP, Peroorkada

== L ==
- Loyola College of Social Sciences
- Loyola School, Thiruvananthapuram

== N ==
- Nirmala Bhavan Higher Secondary School, Kowdiar

== S ==
- Sainik School Kazhakootam
- Saraswathi Vidyalaya, Vattiyoorkavu
- Sarvodaya Vidyalaya, Trivandrum
- SMV High School, Thiruvananthapuram
- St. Mary's Higher Secondary School, Thiruvananthapuram
- St. Thomas School, Thiruvananthapuram
- St. Xavier's College, Thumba

== T ==
- Trivandrum International School, Kizhuvalam
- The Charter School, Goureesapattom

== See also ==
- List of colleges in Thiruvananthapuram
