= Kendriya Vidyalaya No. 2 AFA, Dundigal =

Kendriya Vidyalaya No.2 AFA, Hyderabad
- K.V.2, AFA

Location
- Air Force Academy, Dundigul, Hyderabad; South India; Hyderabad, Andhra Pradesh, 500043; India
- Coordinates: 17°37′38″N 078°24′12″E

Information
- School type: Central Government (Defense)
- Motto: Tattvaṃ Pūṣanapāvṛṇu Sanskrit: तत्त्वं पूषनपावृणु ("The face of Truth is covered by a golden vessel, Remove Thou, O Sun, that covering, for the law of Truth to behold.")
- School board: Central Board of Secondary Education(CBSE), KVS
- Authority: Ministry of Human Resource Development (India)
- Principal: Mr. Hariprasad MA(Economics), M.Ed.
- Headmistress: Mrs. Lakshmi Bhavani
- Staff
- Teaching staff
- Language: English and Hindi
- Campus: Urban
- Campus type: Co-educational
- Houses: Hunter, Avero, Wapti, Kiran
- Colours: Blue, green, red, yellow
- Slogan: "Vidya Sarvatra Shobhate"
- Song: "Bharat Ka Svarnim Gaurav Kendriya Vidyalaya Layega"
- Athletics: Long jump, high jump, discus throw, javelin throw, shot put, 4X100m relay, 100m dash
- Sports: Football, cricket, volleyball, table tennis, throwball, Kabaddi and Kho kho
- Nickname: KVians
- Team name: KV2AFA, Hyderabad
- Rival: Kendriya Vidyalaya No. 1 AFA, Dundigal and all other KVS throughout the country
- Accreditation: ISO
- Newspaper: Vidyalaya Laghupatrika
- Yearbook: Vidyalaya Patrika
- School fees: ₹ 720
- Affiliations: Central Board of Secondary Education, New Delhi
- Information: 08418-254229, 08418-254229
- Website: Kendriya Vidyalaya No.2, AFA, Dundigal

Kendriya Vidyalaya No. 2 AFA is a school situated in Air Force Academy, Dundigul, near Hyderabad, India. It is run by the Kendriya Vidyalaya Sangathan, an autonomous body formed by the Indian Ministry of Human Resource Development.

The Vidyalaya has classes from 1 to 12 with Science stream at 10+2 level. The Vidyalaya is affiliated to the CBSE and follows the 10+2 pattern of education. Apart from the teaching learning process, the students take part in co-curricular activities, sports and games, club activities, work experience, Scouts and Guides, computer education, vocational training, adventure programmes and value education.

== Sports Activities ==
KV2 AFA encourages its students to take part in sports and co-curricular activities. The school organises a sports day annually in which the houses of the school take part in intra-school sports events. The school has won trophies in swimming, cricket, athletics, volleyball and other games at regional and national level.

The school has a children's park which provide recreation to the primary students.

== Teacher achievers ==
Mr. T. Ravi Kumar awarded National incentive award by KVS(HQ) for his innovation in origami during the academic year 2012-13.

S No.	Rooms	Number
1	Class Rooms	22
2	Science practical labs	03
3	Computer labs	02
3	Library	01
4	Jr.Science Lab	01
5	Resource Room(Primary)	01
6	Staff Room	01
7	CCA Hall	01
8	Art and crafts	02
9	AV Room	01
10	Mathematics lab	01
11	Office	01
12	Principal's office	01

== See also ==
- Kendriya Vidyalaya Sangathan
- List of Kendriya Vidyalayas
- Kendriya Vidyalaya No. 1 AFA, Dundigal
