= Kendriya Vidyalaya Bolarum =

Coordinates: 17.444199°N 78.457183°E

Kendriya Vidyalaya Bolarum, Secunderabad
- केन्द्रीय विद्यालय बोलारम, सिकंदराबाद
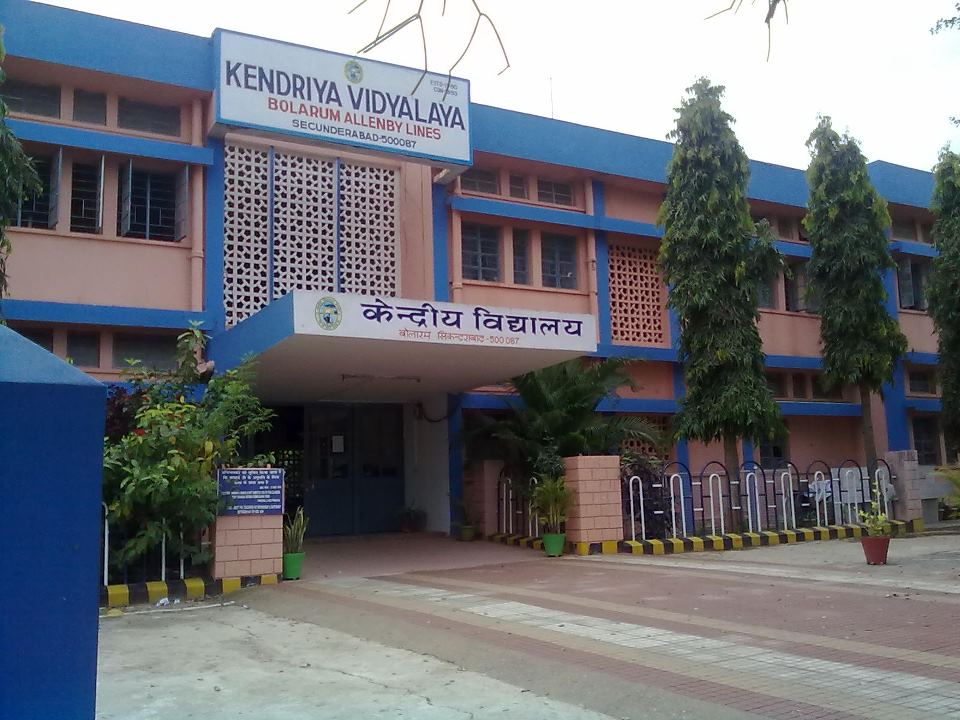
- A view of KV Bolarum
- Allenby lines, J.J. Nagar Post; Secunderabad, Telangana, 500087; India

Information
- School type: Central Government (Defense)
- Motto: Tattvaṃ Pūṣanapāvṛṇu Sanskrit: तत्त्वं पूषनपावृणु ("The face of Truth is covered by a golden vessel, Remove Thou, O Sun, that covering, for the law of Truth to behold.")
- Established: 1980
- Sister school: All Kendriya Vidyalayas across India
- School board: Central Board of Secondary Education(CBSE), KVS
- Authority: Ministry of Human Resource Development (India)
- Chairman: Brig Ajay Malik, Commandent, 1 EME Centre, Secunderabad
- Principal: Sri. Veena rote
- Headmistress: Smt.M. Santhoshi Kumari
- Language: English and Hindi
- Classrooms: 47
- Campus: Urban
- Campus type: Co-educational
- Sports: Football, Cricket, Volleyball, Handball, Table Tennis, Throwball, Kabaddi and Kho kho
- Affiliations: Central Board of Secondary Education, New Delhi
- Highest Grade: XI & XII (Science, Commerce and Humanities)
- Acronym: KVB
- Library Volume: 48438+
- Website: http://www.kvbolarum.org/

Kendriya Vidyalaya Bolarum (KVB, Hindi: केन्द्रीय विद्यालय बोलारम, सिकंदराबाद), is one of the reputed schools in Secunderabad, Telangana. It was started in the year 1980, then shifted to its new campus in 1993. The school is affiliated to the Central Board of Secondary Education, New Delhi.

== History ==
Kendriya Vidyalaya, Bolarum was started in 1980. Col. G.S. Kapoor was the first chairman of the Vidyalaya and Mr. Jones Deva Prasad was its first principal. The Vidyalaya was initially housed in the impermanent Cavalry Barracks of Bison canteen near Nag Mandir. The school at that time did not have the modern amenities infrastructure that is present today, however still it carries the crown of being one of the best school in the twin cities.

== Growth of the School ==
Initially the school had only I to V classes. At the beginning only a few teachers joined and gradually the school was upgraded and the expansion of the campus took place and the infrastructure was developed. The labs were gradually equipped. The very first sports day of the Vidyalaya was conducted in Docca Stadium, near Lothkunta, Secunderabad.

By 1984, the school was extended up to class X. Under the able guidance of Sri. Achunni the then Assistant Commissioner, Sri. S. Gondane, the then Principal, the school had carried out various projects and activities. Then the school had three sections from class I to X.

The school was moved into current location in the year 1993, with four sections for each class. Now the school has +2 level with science and humanities streams. The subject accountancy was introduced as one of the options in the humanities stream.

In 1998 a series of population and development workshops were conducted at the school.

In 2008 All India KVS National Games and Sports Meet was conducted and K.V. Bolarum hosted National games for Lawn Tennis and Table Tennis. In 2009 the Vidyalaya started commerce stream at +2 level.

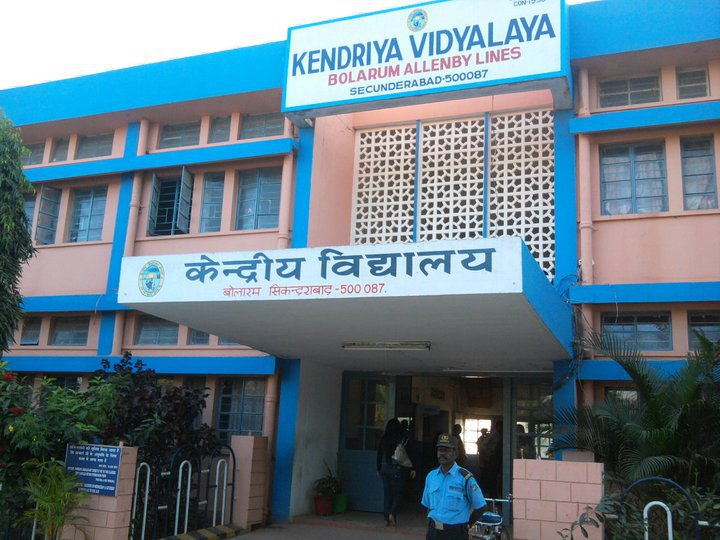
KV Bolarum Main Entrance

== Location of the School ==
Initially the school was located near the Nag Mandir near Cavalry Barracks. The school did not have its Playground, all the sport event were organised at Docca Stadium. Now, the school is moved to a new location situated in 1 EME Centre and 1.5 km from Lakadawala and 1.5 km from Eagle Chouk near RSI.The school has its own independent vast play grounds in approximately 2.5 acres.

== See also ==
- Central Board of Secondary Education
- Kendriya Vidyalaya
- List of Kendriya Vidyalayas
- NCERT
