= Kendriya Vidyalaya Tirumalagiri =

Kendriya Vidyalaya Tirumalagiri, Secunderabad
- केन्द्रीय विद्यालय तिरुमालागिरी,सिकंदराबाद
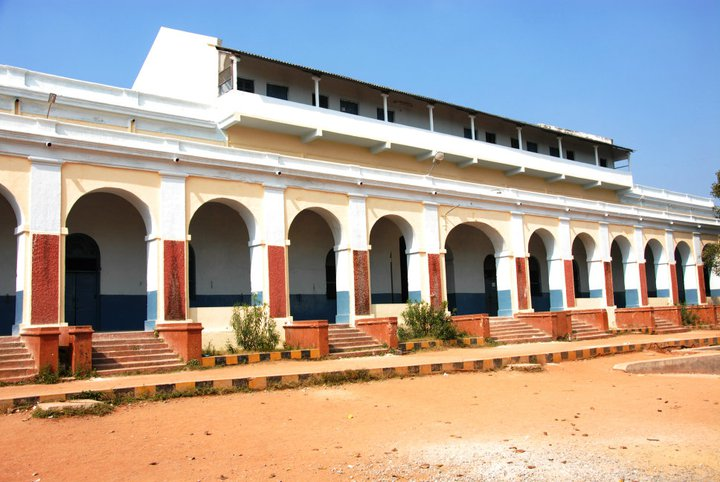
- KVT

Location
- Kendriya Vidyalaya, Tirumalagiri; Secunderabad, Telangana, 500 015; India; 17.4766337°N 78.5192858°E

Information
- School type: Central Government (Defense)
- Motto: Tattvaṃ Pūṣanapāvṛṇu Sanskrit: तत्त्वं पूषनपावृणु ("The face of Truth is covered by a golden vessel, Remove Thou, O Sun, that covering, for the law of Truth to behold.")
- Established: 1963
- Sister school: All Kendriya Vidyalayas across India
- School board: Central Board of Secondary Education(CBSE), KVS
- Authority: Ministry of Human Resource Development (India)
- Chairman: Commissioner Avinash Dikshit
- Principal: Shri Chandrashekhar
- Language: English and Hindi
- Classrooms: 58
- Campus: Urban
- Campus type: Co-educational
- Sports: Football, cricket, volleyball, handball, table tennis, throwball, Kabaddi and Kho kho
- Affiliations: Central Board of Secondary Education, New Delhi
- Highest grade: XI and XII (Science, Commerce and Humanities)
- Acronym: KVT
- Affiliation No: 100003
- Website: kvtirumalagiri.org

Kendriya Vidyalaya Tirumalagiri (KVT, Hindi: केन्द्रीय विद्यालय तिरुमालागिरी,सिकंदराबाद), is one of the schools in Secunderabad city of Telangana, India. It was started in 1963, then expanded later on the same campus. The school is affiliated to the Central Board of Secondary Education, New Delhi. It offers education from grade 1 to 12. According to the school website, its Mission is To cater to the educational needs of children of transferable Central Government including Defence and Para-military personnel by providing a common programme of education

== Genesis ==
The area where the school is built was earlier an Army area. Kendriya Vidyalaya Sangathan took over the Army Regiment and started the school on that place on 16 December 1963. The school has stayed at the same place.

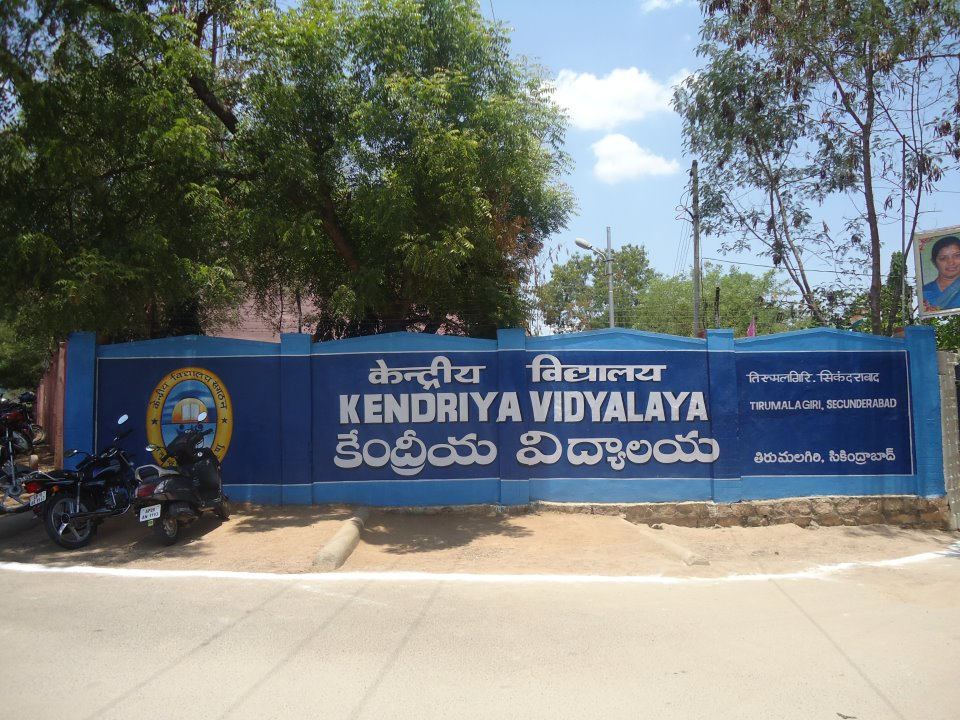
The name board of the school

== Infrastructure ==
Kendriya Vidyalaya Tirumalagiri was established in 1963. Spread over 15 acres, the Vidyalaya has three separate blocks for Primary, Secondary, and Senior Secondary with a football court, a volleyball court, an athletic track, Multipurpose Hall and two large playgrounds.

The school has classes I to XII, affiliated to CBSE, with five sections each in classes up to X and four sections each in classes XI & XII. The Vidyalaya offers Science, Commerce & Humanities streams at XI and XII levels. It has 2500+ students and 90 staff members. The school has coached for games and sports, craft teachers, computer instructors and spoken English teachers on their staff. There are labs for Physics, Chemistry, Biology, Maths, and a Junior Science lab. There are five computer labs on the campus. There is one yoga room.

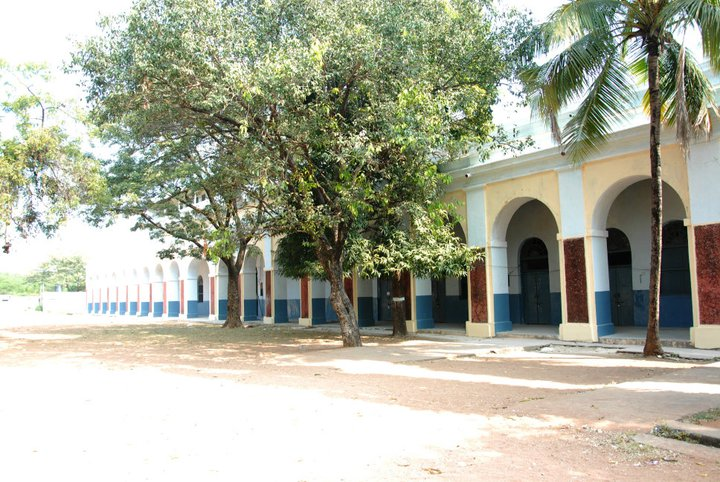
School Building

== Expansions ==
The following is the list of expansions that took place in these 49 years:

- 1963 - Vidyalaya started in a single British officer's accommodation. Classes VI and VII are accommodated there.
- 1965– Present Army school Barracks were given to KVT to run the primary section, till 1968.
- 1966 - Labs and library were constructed.
- 1967 - The present Higher Secondary Block was constructed.
- 1968 - Upstairs building was constructed over the single British Officers Accommodation where at present yoga and Socially Useful Productive Work classes for children are held.
- 2008– Present primary Block was inaugurated

== See also ==
- List of Kendriya Vidyalayas
- Education in India
- List of schools in India
