= Kendriya Vidyalaya No. 1 AFA, Dundigal =

Kendriya Vidyalaya No.1 AFA Hyderabad

Location
- Air Force Academy, Dundigul, Hyderabad; South India; Hyderabad, Telangana, 500043; India; 17°37′38″N 078°24′12″E

Information
- School type: Central Government (Defense)
- Motto: Tattvaṃ Pūṣanapāvṛṇu Sanskrit: तत्त्वं पूषनपावृणु (" The face of Truth is covered by a golden vessel, Remove Thou, O Sun, that covering, for the law of Truth to behold. ")
- Established: 24 March 1977; 49 years ago
- Sister school: All Kendriya Vidyalayas across India
- School board: Central Board of Secondary Education(CBSE), KVS
- Authority: Ministry of Human Resource Development (India)
- Chairman: AVM PS SHARMA VSM
- Principal: Mrs. Veena A. Rote MA (Eng), M.Ed, Ed.S (Edl Admn)
- Headmistress: Mrs. Sai Padma
- Staff: 47
- Teaching staff: 83
- Enrollment: 923 (6-11-2011)
- Student to teacher ratio: 21:1
- Language: English and Hindi
- Classrooms: 29
- Campus: Urban
- Campus size: ~16-acre (65,000 m^{2})
- Campus type: Co-educational
- Houses: Shivaji, Tagore, Ashoka, Raman
- Colours: Blue, green, red, yellow
- Slogan: "Vidya Sarvatra Shobhate"
- Song: "Bharat Ka Svarnim Gaurav Kendriya Vidyalaya Layega"
- Athletics: Long jump, high jump, discus throw, javelin throw, shot put
- Sports: Football, cricket, volleyball, basketball, handball, table tennis, throwball, hockey, Kabaddi and Kho kho
- Nickname: KVAFAians
- Team name: KV1AFA, Hyderabad-1
- Rival: KV2AFA, Hyderabad and all other KVS throughout the country
- Accreditation: ISO
- Publication: 30
- Newspaper: Vidyalaya Laghupatrika
- Yearbook: Vidyalaya Patrika
- Budget: +3 lakh Rupees as in October 2011
- School fees: ₹ 720
- Affiliations: Central Board of Secondary Education, New Delhi
- Alumni: Kendriya Vidyalaya No.1 AFA Alumni Association
- Information: +91 8418 254238; +91 8418 253649
- Highest Grade: XII (Commerce and Arts)
- Acronym: KV1AFA or KV1DUNDIGAL
- Library volume: 16000 as of 31 October 2011
- Website: http://kv1afa.org/

Kendriya Vidyalaya No.1 AFA Dundigal Hyderabad (KV No.1 AFA, Dundigul, established 24 March 1977) is a school situated within the Air Force Academy, Dundigul Hyderabad, India. Run by the Kendriya Vidyalaya Sangathan, an autonomous body formed by the Ministry of Human Resource Development, Government of India, New Delhi.

Started in 1977, the Vidyalaya has classes from I to XII with an enrollment of 900 with science and commerce streams at the Plus-Two level.

The Vidyalaya is affiliated to the CBSE and follows the 10+2 pattern of education. Apart from the teaching learning process, the students take part in co-curricular activities, sports and games, club activities, work experience, Scouts and Guides, computer education, vocational training, adventure programmes and value education.

== Sports activities ==
दया कर दान
English: Daya Kar Daan (KV 1 AFA Morning Prayer)

Audio sample
- K V No.1 AFA Morning Prayer- Daya Kar Daan: file; help

KV 1 AFA encourages its students to take part in sports and activities. The school organises a sports day annually in which the houses of the school take part in intra-school sports events. The school has won trophies in football, cricket, athletics and other games at regional and national level.

The school has two children parks which provide recreation to the primary students.

KV 1 AFA is also equipped with sports facilities as below:

Sports/games	Infrastructure	Number
Basketball	Court	02
Cricket	Ground	01
Football	Field	01
Handball	Court	01
High Jump	Pit	01
Long Jump	Pit	01
Table Tennis	Tables	02
Throwball	Throw arena	01
Volleyball	Court	04
Hockey	Field	01
Kabaddi	Court	01

== Student activities ==
The school encourages the students to take part in national level competitions and examinations. A few student activities are listed below:

- Educational trips
- Green Olympiad
- Mathematics Olympiad
- National Level essay and painting competitions
- National Talent Search exam
- Scouting activities
- Think Quest
- Youth Parliament
- Science Olympiad
- National Cyber Olympiad
- International Mathematics Olympiad
- KVS IYC 2011 competitions
- National Children's Science Congress

== Campus learning aids and facilities ==
A few are listed below :

- 2 Mbit/s campus broadband access
- Art room
- Audio visual room with OHP, LCD projectors and Smart Boards
- Four computer labs
- Intel Technology Aided Learning (TAL) Project.
- Junior science lab for primary students.
- Library of 20,000 volumes and 30 national and international publications.
- Resources Room, for both primary and secondary students.
- Three Science labs for secondary and higher students.
- Mathematics Lab
- Sports room
- Hall (Yoga and functions)

== See also ==
- Kendriya Vidyalaya No. 2 AFA, Dundigal
- Kendriya Vidyalaya Sangathan
- List of Kendriya Vidyalaya schools
- List of Kendriya Vidyalaya Alumni Associations
