= Kendriya Vidyalaya, Hebbal =

Kendriya Vidyalaya Hebbal
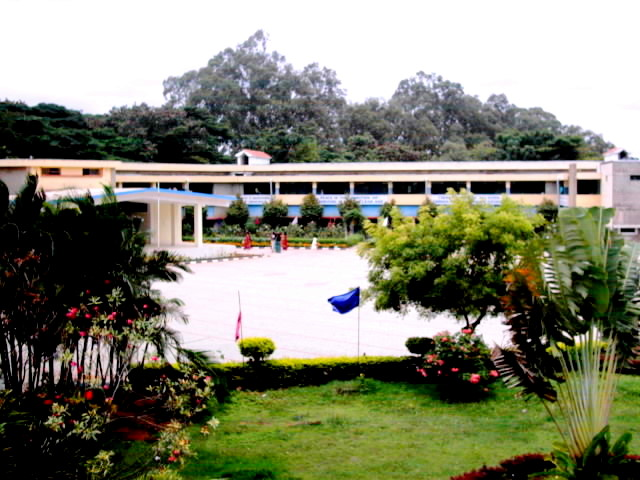
- KV Hebbal campus

Location
- Sadashivanagar Post, Bangalore, Karnataka; South India; Bangalore, Karnataka, 560080; India
- Coordinates: 13°0′56″N 77°34′33″E

Information
- Other names: KVH
- School type: Central Government (Defense)
- Motto: Tattvaṃ Pūṣanapāvṛṇu Sanskrit: तत्त्वं पूषनपावृणु ("The face of Truth is covered by a golden vessel, Remove Thou, O Sun, that covering, for the law of Truth to behold.")
- Established: 1 September 1965
- Sister school: All Kendriya Vidyalayas across India
- School board: Central Board of Secondary Education(CBSE), KVS
- Authority: Ministry of Human Resource Development (India)
- Chairman
- Principal: Vinayak
- Headmistress: Mrs.Anusuya Shrivastava
- Staff: 85
- Teaching staff: 100 73
- Enrollment: 3600 (31-8-2011)
- Student to teacher ratio: 36:1
- Language: English and Hindi
- Classrooms: 57
- Campus: Urban
- Campus size: ~15-acre (61,000 m^{2})
- Campus type: Co-educational
- Houses: Shivaji, Tagore, Ashoka, Raman, Subhash [Former]
- Colours: Blue, orange, green, yellow and red
- Slogan: "Vidya Sarvatra Shobhate"
- Song: "Bharat Ka Svarnim Gaurav Kendriya Vidyalaya Layega"
- Athletics: Long jump, high jump, Shot Put, Javelin throw
- Sports: Football, cricket, volleyball, basketball, handball, table tennis, throwball, hockey, kabaddi, and kho kho
- Accreditation: ISO, QCI
- Publication: 30
- School fees: ₹ 2400
- Affiliations: Central Board of Secondary Education, New Delhi
- Alumni: Kendriya Vidyalaya Hebbal Alumni Association
- Highest grade: XII (Science and Commerce)
- Library volume: ~20,000
- Website: hebbalbangalore.kvs.ac.in

Kendriya Vidyalaya Hebbal, is a school in Bangalore and part of the Kendriya Vidyalaya Sangathan in India. It was started in 1965. The school is affiliated to the Central Board of Secondary Education.

The school has classes from I to XII with an enrollment of 2800. It has maintained a 100% pass percentage record in class X for seven consecutive years.

Apart from academics, the school encourages students to participate in extra-curricular activities, competitions and games and sports events organized by the KV Sangathan and other schools at national level.

KVH is also one of the few schools in India to get accredited by the Quality Council of India (QCI) and the National Accreditation Board for Education and Training (NABET). It has signed an MoU with QCI for promoting quality education in Kendriya Vidyalayas across India.

== Campus ==
The school won the Lal Bagh Botanical Garden award for the best garden for six consecutive years. There are trees and flowering plants all around the campus. The main building of the school is a large open-centered pentagon. At the center of the pentagon is an assembly ground.

Rain water harvesting is practiced in campus. The campus has staff quarters and a play area to accommodate the faculty and their families.

KVH is one of the few chosen Kendriya Vidyalayas to have upgraded to E-Classroom and e-Learning teaching process with the implementation of Smart Boards in the classrooms.

== Faculty ==
The school has 73 teaching staff members, in three categories: post-graduate teachers (PGTs), trained graduate teachers (TGTs) and primary teachers (PRTs).

== Student activities ==
The school encourages the students to take part in national level competitions and examinations to increase their exposure and also conducts workshops to update the students with information in the fields of Science, Humanities and Commerce.

A few student activities are listed below :

- Educational Trips
- Green Olympiad
- Mathematics Olympiad
- National Level Essay and Painting Competitions
- National Talent Search Exam
- Scouting activities
- Think Quest
- Youth Parliament
- National Cyber Olympiad
- National Science Olympiad
- International Mathematics Olympiad

Mock parliament sessions British council incentives

For CCA activities and house contests, the students are placed into four houses: Shivaji (red), Tagore (green), Ashoka (yellow) and Raman (blue). Earlier, there used to be five houses, the fifth one being Subhash with house colour orange.

== Campus learning aids and facilities ==
Campus learning facilities are listed below :

- 4 Mbit/s campus broadband access.
- Art Room.
- Atal Tinkering Lab.
- Audio Visual Room with overhead projector, LCD projectors and Smart Boards.
- Computer labs (two).
- Intel Technology Aided Learning (TAL) Project.
- Junior Science Lab (one) for classes taught by science TGTs.
- Library of 20,000 volumes of books and 30 national and international publications.
- Resources Rooms (two), for primary and secondary students.
- Science Labs (three) for secondary and higher students.
- Sports Room, Music Room and Dance Room.
- Student Activity Room with recreational facilities.

== Sports activities ==
दया कर दान
English: Daya Kar Daan (KVH Morning Prayer)

Audio sample
- KV Hebbal Morning Prayer- Daya Kar Daan: file; help

The school organises a sports day annually in which the Houses take part in intra-school sports events. The school has won many trophies in Football, Cricket, Athletics and other games at the regional and national levels.

The school consists of three Children Parks which provide recreation to the primary students.

KVH is equipped with sports facilities which are shown in the table below :

Sports/games	Infrastructure	Number
Basketball	Court	1
Cricket	Ground	1
Football	Field	2
Handball	Court	1
High jump	Pit	1
Long jump	Pit	1
Table tennis	Tables	2
Throwball	Throw arena	1
Volleyball	Court	3
Kabaddi	Court	2
Kho Kho	Court	2

== Alumni ==
The school has an alumni association that meets annually in the school campus on the eve of the Indian Independence Day.

== Gallery ==
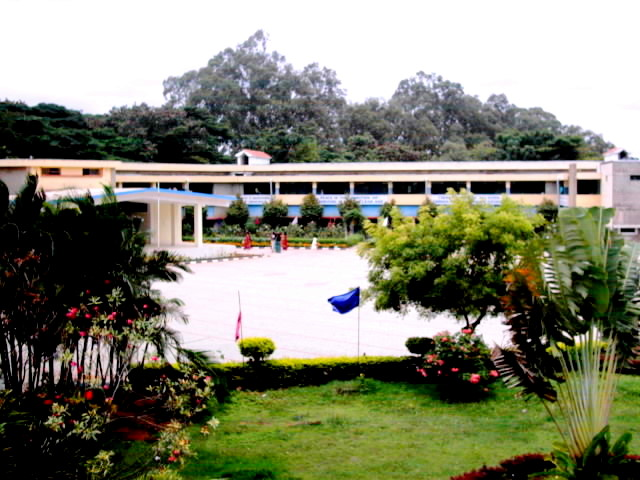
KV Hebbal Campus

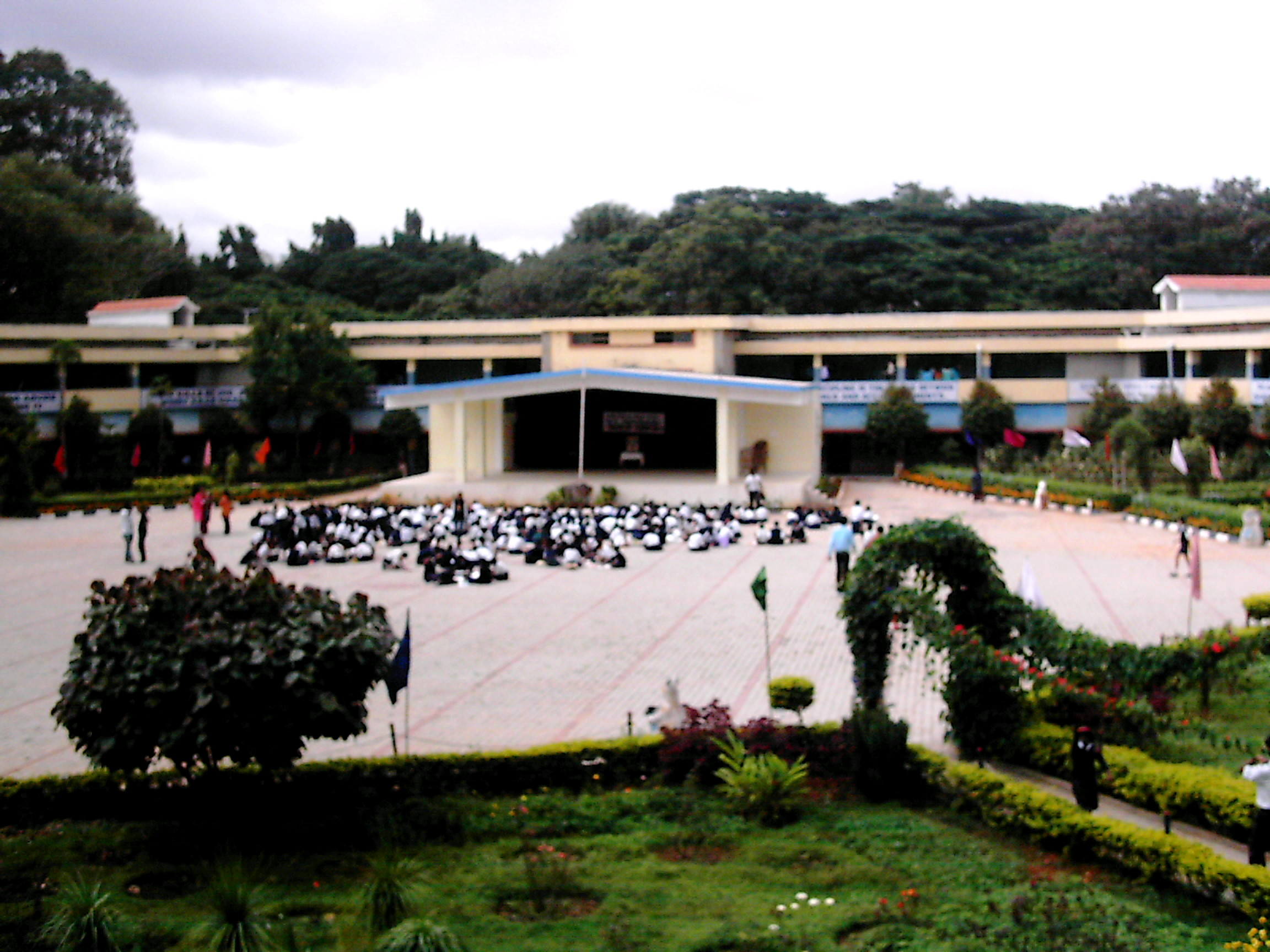
Assembly ground

== See also ==
- Central Board of Secondary Education
- Kendriya Vidyalaya
- List of Kendriya Vidyalayas
- NCERT
