= Kendriya Vidyalaya, Jalahalli East =

KV No.2, Jalahalli, Bangalore
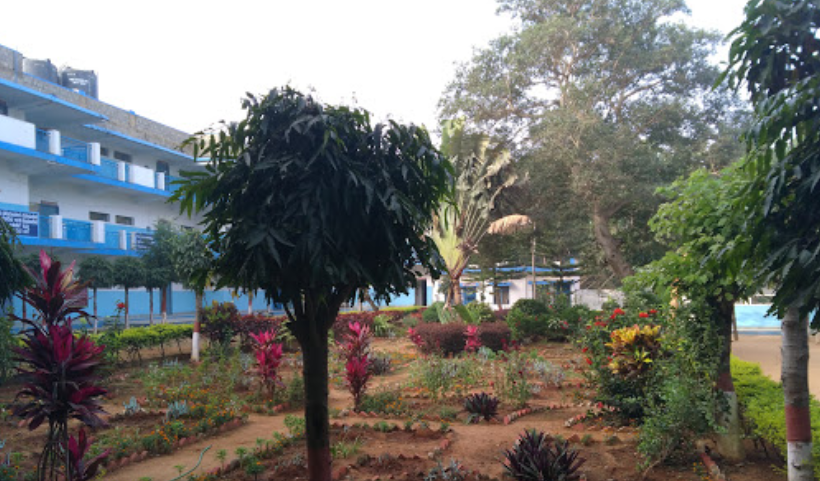
- Front view
- Bangalore, Karnataka 560014; India

Information
- Established: 1982
- School board: Central Board of Secondary Education (CBSE)
- Authority: Ministry of Human Resource Development
- Principal: JYOTI SHARMA
- Website: no2jalahalli.kvs.ac.in

Kendriya Vidyalaya, No.2, Air Force Station, Jalahalli East, Bangalore, India is run by the Kendriya Vidyalaya Sangathan, an autonomous body under the MHRD, Government of India. Started in 1982, the Vidyalaya has classes from I to XII with an enrollment of 2300 with Science and Commerce streams at the Plus-Two level.

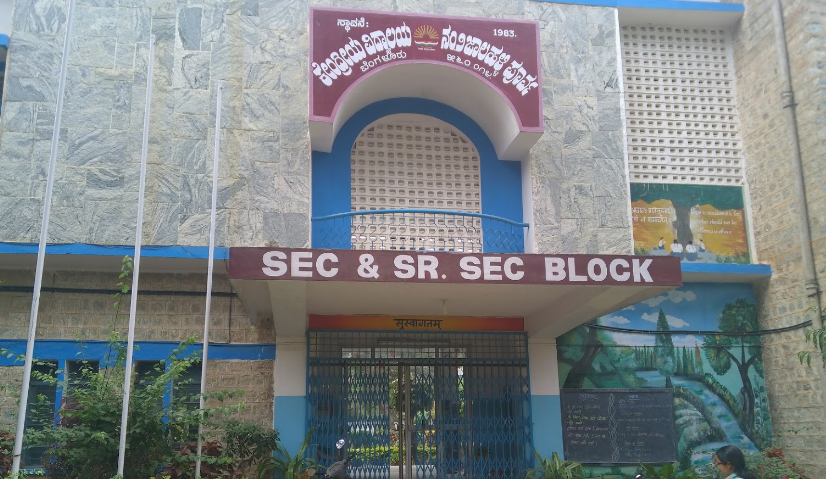

The Vidyalaya is affiliated to the Central Board of Secondary Education and follows the 10+2 pattern of education. Apart from the teaching learning process, the students take part in co-curricular activities, sports and games, club activities, work experience, Scouts and Guides, National Cadet Corps (NCC), computer education, vocational training, adventure programmes and value education.

== See also ==
- Kendriya Vidyalaya Sangathan
- List of Kendriya Vidyalayas
