= C. Sylendra Babu =

Director General of Tamil Nadu Police from 2021 to 2023

- சி.சைலேந்திர பாபு
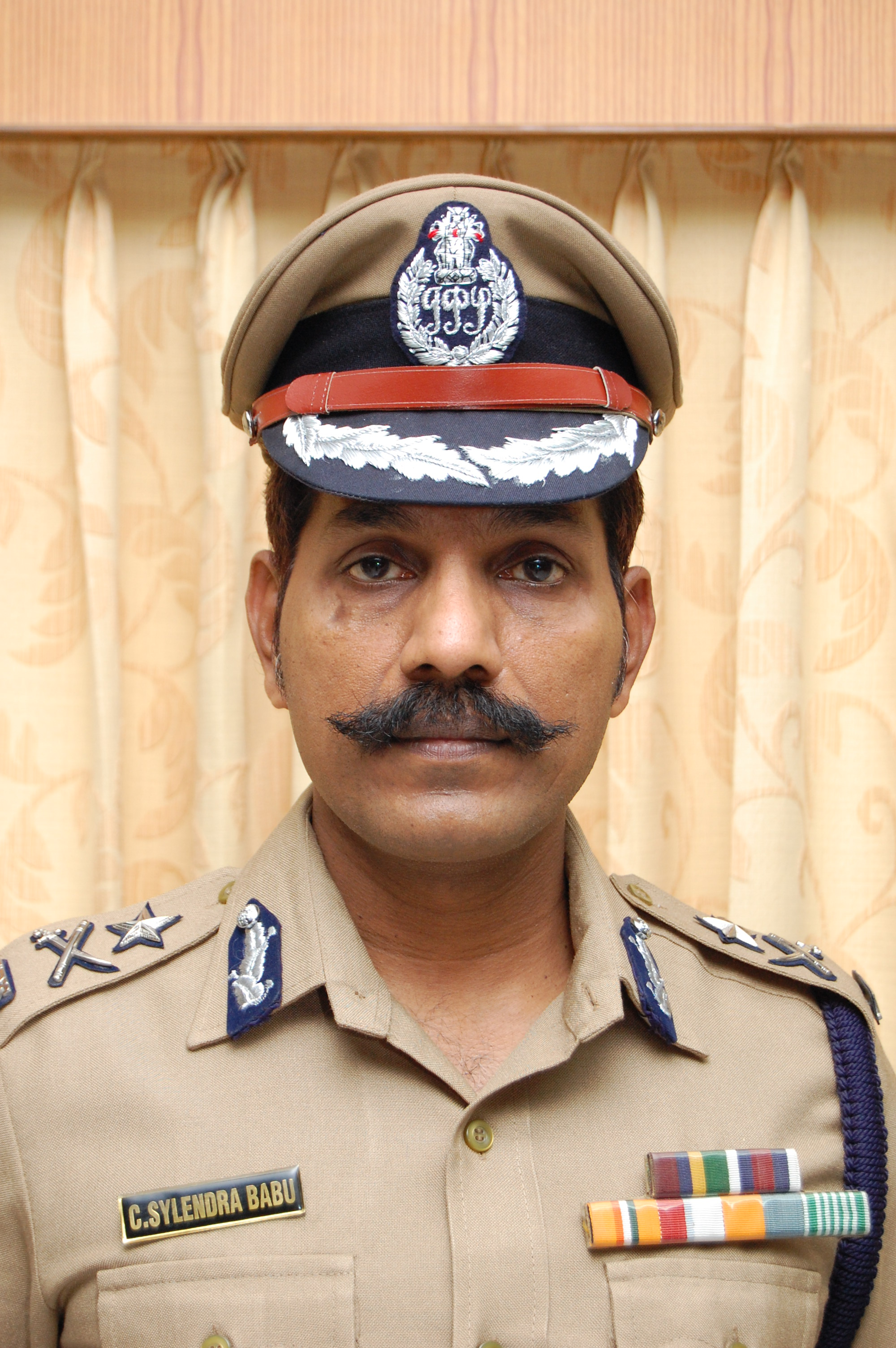

31st Director General of Police
- In office 30 June 2021 – 30 June 2023
- Preceded by: J.K. Tripathy
- Succeeded by: Shankar Jiwal
- Chief Minister: M. K. Stalin

Personal details
- Born: 5 June 1962 (age 64) Kuzhithurai, Kanyakumari District, Tamil Nadu, India
- Education: Tamil Nadu Agricultural University; Annamalai University; Bharathidasan University; University of Madras
- Awards: President's medal for devotion to duty; Prime Minister's medal for life saving; Chief Minister's medal for gallantry; Chief Minister's medal for devotion to duty; TN Special Task Force Police Medal for gallantry, bravery and heroic action; President's Police Medal for Distinguished Service; Chief Minister's medal for excellence in public service
- Website: Official website

Dr. C. Sylendra Babu (born 5 June 1962) is a retired Indian Police Service Officer who served as the 31st Director General of Police and Head of Police Force, Tamil Nadu Police. In addition to his distinguished law enforcement career, he is a Tamil author, motivational speaker, mentor for civil services aspirants and a fitness influencer.

== Early life and education ==
Dr.Sylendra Babu was born in the town of Kuzhithurai, Kanniyakumari District, Tamil Nadu. He attended the Govt Higher Secondary School, Vilavancode, Kanyakumari District. He has BSc (Agriculture) from the Agricultural College and Research Institute, Madurai and majored in agriculture from the Tamil Nadu Agricultural University, Coimbatore. Later, he obtained BGL and MA degrees in population studies from the Annamalai University and was awarded a PhD for his thesis on "missing children" by the University of Madras. In 2013, he obtained a Master of Business Administration degree in Human Resources. He holds a PhD degree in Criminology from the University of Madras.

== Personal life ==
Babu has written a Tamil book on physical fitness. During the course of his police training, he was awarded the RD Singh Cup for Swimming at the National Police Academy, Hyderabad. In December 2004 he represented India for the 100 metres event in the Asian Masters Athletic Championships, Bangkok. He has also participated in several 10k runs such as the Chennai Marathon and the Coimbatore Marathon. He led a contingent of 26 marine commandos for the Half Marathon event in the 2014 Auroville Marathon.

== Police career ==
Babu joined the Indian Police Service (IPS) as a member of the 1987 batch. He was trained at the National Police Academy, Hyderabad. He has served as the Assistant Superintendent of Police (ASP), in Dharmapuri, Gobichettipalayam, Salem and Dindigul and as the Superintendent of Police (SP), in Chengalpattu, Sivagangai, Cuddalore and Kancheepuram districts and as the Deputy Commissioner of Police, Adayar-Chennai. He has also served as the Deputy Inspector-General (DIG) of Police of Viluppuram Range and as the Joint Commissioner of Police, Chennai. Later, he became the DIG of Police, Tiruchirapalli before becoming the Chief Vigilance Officer in Karur, served as Commissioner of Police, Coimbatore prior to becoming Inspector-General (IG) for Northern Zone, Chennai.

In April 2012, he was promoted to the rank of Additional Director-General of Police (ADGP) of Prisons, Tamil Nadu. Later, he was appointed the ADGP of Coastal Police and then appointed as the ADGP of Railway Police. In March 2019, he was promoted as the Director General of Police (DGP) of Railway Police.

During his tenure as the commissioner of Coimbatore city, he introduced computer literacy program in various schools in association with Lead India 2020. The schools are also adopted by the local police station under the program. He has organised free karate camps for children from the poor economic section. He has also initiated karate camps in various women's colleges.

Babu played a pivotal role in building the TN Coastal Security Group of Tamil Nadu and its interoperability with other forces. He organized several security and disaster response drills and camps with the Indian Navy, Indian Coast Guard, National Disaster Response Force (NDRF), State Disaster Management Agency and NGOs like India Red Cross and Survival Instincts.

On 30 June 2021, he took charge as DGP of Tamil Nadu Police.

=== Ranks held ===
Indian Police Service
Insignia	Rank	Date Acquired
	DGP and Head of Police Force	30 June 2021
	Director General of Police – DGP	11 March 2019
	Additional Director-General of Police – ADGP	22 April 2012
	Inspector-General – IG	2007
	Deputy Inspector-General – DIG	2001
	Superintendent of Police – SP	1992
	Assistant Superintendent of Police – ASP	October 1989

=== Awards and honours ===
- Special Task Force bravery medal upon death of the forest bandit Veerappan in 2004, for leading operations against him as the Assistant Superintendent of Police of Gobichettipalayam in 1989
- President's Medal for Meritorious Service in 2005
- Blue Cross of India 2007 Award presented by Menaka Gandhi, President of the People for Animals in Chennai, for implementing effective preventive measures against animal cruelty
- The Best Alumnus Award presented by then Governor of Tamil Nadu, Surjit Singh Barnala in the Annual Convocation function held at the Tamil Nadu Agricultural University, Coimbatore on 25 July 2008, to felicitate 15 years of motivating Civil Service aspirants
- President's Police Medal for Distinguished Service 26 January 2013
- Chief Minister's Medal for excellence in public service 15 August 2019

== Sports ==
Babu was manager of the Indian national athletic team in various events. He held this role for the 2002 Asian Athletics Championships – Colombo, Sri Lanka, the 2003 World Championships in Athletics – Paris, France and the 2007 World Championships in Athletics – Osaka, Japan. He was also appointed an observer of the Indian athletics contingent for the 2008 Summer Olympics, Beijing.

Babu was the president of the Throwball Federation of India, Tamil Nadu and also the vice-president of the Tamil Nadu Athletic Association. During his tenure as the president of the Coimbatore Rifle Club, from February 2010 to June 2011, he took the initiative to open rifle clubs in various schools across Tamil Nadu.

On 8 February 2013, Babu organized and participated in an 890 km cycle rally from Chennai to Kanyakumari along with the members of Coastal Security Group and Indian Coast Guard. The rally was over a period of 10 days and aimed at creating awareness about the functioning of Coastal police and the Coast Guard among coastal residents. He has also participated in various police and civilian shooting competitions.

While serving as the ADGP coastal security group, Babu cycled from Chennai to Kanyakumari - which is approximately 700 km. In 2017, he was a member of a cycling expedition from Kashmir to Kanyakumari covering 4,500 km in 32 days. Babu is a Super Randonneur, having completed 600 km bicycle ride between Chennai to Rameshwaram in 36 hours.

In March 2018, Babu lead a team of 9 Coastal Police Officers and swam 18 nautical miles across the Palk Strait (Thalaimannar, Sri Lanka to Dhanushkodi) in 12 hours.

== Books ==
- You Too Can Become an I.P.S. Officer (2008, ISBN 9788172542818)
- Neengalum IPS Adigaari Aagalam (2008)
- Boys & Girls - Be Ambitious (2009, ISBN 9788184494082)
- Principles of Success in Interview (2009, ISBN 978-8174789846)
- A Guide to Health & Happiness (2012, ISBN 9788184494730)
- Sathikka Asaippadu (2014, ISBN 9788184495478)
- Udalinai Urithi Sei (2015, ISBN 9788184492644)
- Avarkalal Mudiyum Endral Nammalum Mudiyum (2016, ISBN 9788184467741)
- Americavil 24 Naatkal
- Ungalukana 24 por vidhigal (2017, ISBN 9788174783660)
- Unakkul oru Thalaivan (2017, ISBN 9788184462739)
- Sinthiththa Velaiyil (2018, ISBN 9788193366998)
