= Kendriya Vidyalaya, IIT Powai =

Coordinates: 19.1291°N 72.9185°E

- IIT Campus, Central Area, IIT Area, Powai, Mumbai, Maharashtra 400076

Information
- School type: Government
- Established: 1964
- Authority: Ministry of Education (MHRD)
- Principal: Vinodh S Wankhede
- Classes: 1st to Grade 12th
- Website: http://www.cfdvs.iitb.ac.in/kvschool/

English: Daya Kar Daan (KV Powai Morning Prayer)

Audio sample
- K V Powai Morning Prayer- Daya Kar Daan: file; help

Kendriya Vidyalaya, IIT Powai (also known as Kendriya Vidyalaya, IIT Bombay and KV Powai), is an Indian Institute of Technology (IIT) secondary school affiliated to Central Board of Secondary Education (CBSE) board in Mumbai, India. It was established on 15 December 1964. It is part of the Kendriya Vidyalaya Sangathan. It is considered to be one of the top government schools in India. It was ranked 2nd on the top 10 rankings for government day schools by the Education World India School Rankings 2015.

== History ==
Kendriya Vidyalaya, IIT Powai was founded on 15 December 1964 by the founder-principal S. Ramchandran.

== Campus ==
Kendriya Vidyalaya, IIT Powai is located within the IIT Bombay campus in Powai, a suburb in northwestern Mumbai. It is housed within a three-storied building with 3 wings, for the primary, secondary and senior secondary sections.

== Facilities ==
Sr. No	Type of Room	No. of Such Rooms available	No. of Such Rooms Lying Vacant
1	No. of class rooms	48	0
2	Science Lab	04	0
3	Computer Lab	03	0
4	Library	01	0
5	Jr. Science Lab	0	0
6	Resource/Activity Room (Primary wing)	01	0
7	Resource/Activity Room (Secondary wing)	0	0
8	Staff Common Room	02	0
9	Music room	01	0
10	Sports room	01	0
11	Art Room	01	0
12	Sanskrit Room	01	0
13	SUPW Room	0	0
14	Examination Room	01	0
15	Maths Room	01	0
16	English Room	01	0
17	Hindi Room	01	0

== See also ==
- List of Kendriya Vidyalayas
