= Kendriya Vidyalaya, Kayamkulam =

School in Haripad, Kerala, India

Location
- Kendriya Vidyalaya NTPC Kayamkulam Cheppad P.O, Haripad PIN -690507; Haripad, Kerala; India; 9.2445°N 76.4643°E

Information
- Established: 1999; 27 years ago
- Founder: Mrs. Hema K
- School district: Alappuzha
- Principal: Mrs. Hema K
- Enrollment: 665
- Houses: 4
- Affiliation: CBSE
- Website: https://kayamkulamntpc.kvs.ac.in/

Kendriya Vidyalaya, NTPC Kayamkulam is located in Cheppad, Haripad. Affiliated to CBSE, this school started operating on 28 July 1999. Under the funding of NTPC, Kendriya Vidyalaya caters mainly to the needs of the project employees. This KV, along with all the other KV's provides education to children across India. It is a part of the Kendriya Vidyalaya Sangathan under the Ministry of Human Resource Development, Government of India.

== Infrastructure ==
There are 13 classrooms, five science labs, a fully automated library, an art room, a computer lab, an Audio-Visual room, a children's playground, a cricket pitch, a volleyball court, a football ground, and an athletics field. The Vidyalaya has buildings with all infrastructural facilities with classrooms, laboratories in physics, chemistry, and biology for +2 classes, mathematics lab, language lab, computer lab with more than 25 computers, A.V. room with LCD projector, O.H. projectors, activity room, broadband internet facility with LAN, playground with basketball & shuttle badminton courts, and others.

== Library ==
The Vidyalaya library has 8510 titles and subscribe to about 70 periodicals. The library is automated by using PALIBS library management software. All the books are classified and bar-coded. Apart from the main library classroom, a section is being maintained for primary children only. Children write book reviews for every book they read. Library committee is formed to make the library services more effective. Guidance and counselling section is functioning in the library by providing library materials to the Vidyalaya community.
