= Karnataka Public School =

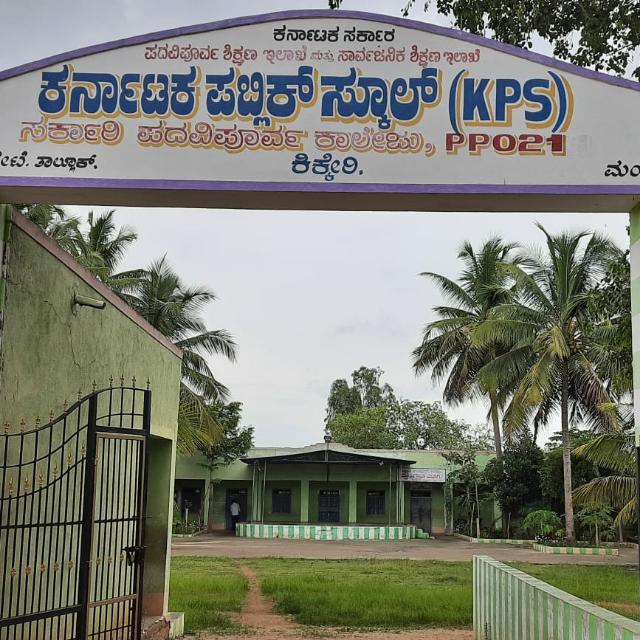

Information
- Authority: Department of Education, Government of Karnataka
- Website: ssk.karnataka.gov.in/Home/ProgrammesKPS

The Karnataka Public School is a system of Government of Karnataka schools in India that are instituted under the aegis of the Department of Education, Government of Karnataka. As of May 2021, it has a total of 276 schools in Karnataka. These schools have both English medium and Kannada medium. They have classes from Lower KG to 12. The facilities at such schools have smart classes, interactive blackboards, sufficient teachers, and a good number of classrooms.

== History ==
The Department of Education has primary, secondary, secondary, and undergraduate levels. With each level, the number of students enrolling to the next level was declining. To avoid this, the Karnataka Public Schools (KPS) were started to facilitate learning in the premises of a single educational institute from 1st standard to undergraduate level. These schools were converted from existing pre-university colleges into public schools. The government set up 176 schools in 2018–19 and another 100 in 2019–20.

== Management ==
The principal of the existing pre-university college shall be the administrative and academic head of the school. The Principal will be assisted by the headmaster of the existing secondary school, who shall be designated as vice-principal of the school. These schools had separate organizational rules and guidelines and were based on the Kendriya Vidyalaya model.

== Schools ==
=== Mandya ===
NTT Course - 8747826136

- KPS Devalapura
- KPS Kikkeri
- KPS Besagarall
- KPS Halaguru
- KPS Basaralu
- KPS Chinakurali
- KPS Arkere
- KPS K.R.Pet
- KPS Guthal Colony Arakeswara Nagara
