= Kendriya Vidyalaya, Malleswaram =

Location
- 18th Cross, Margosa Road; Malleswaram, Bengaluru, India, Karnataka, 560055; India; 13°0′33.2″N 77°34′7.4″E

Information
- Established: 4 July 1965
- Principal: Mr. Anil Kumar
- Grades: 10+2 (Science, Commerce)
- Campus size: 2-acre (8,100 m^{2})
- Affiliation: Central Board of Secondary Education
- Website: malleshwaram.kvs.ac.in

Kendriya Vidyalaya Malleswaram is a school in Bangalore, India. It is one of the schools under the group known as the Kendriya Vidyalayas, a system of central government schools under the Ministry of Human Resource Development (India). Kendriya Vidyalaya Malleshwaram is one of fourteen Kendriya Vidyalayas in Bangalore.

== Background ==
In 1966, the school was established at the temporary accommodation at CET cell. In 1972, the first batch of class X appeared for the board exams. In 1980, the first batch of class XII appeared for the board exams. In 2010, the commerce stream in class XI was started. Committed to quality education, KV Malleswaram has about 1800 students and 60 staff. The Vidyalaya has three sections from class I to XII, offering physics, chemistry, biology/computer science, and maths/Hindi/Sanskrit in one section (science stream) and in another section (commerce stream) offering accountancy, business studies, economics as subjects in senior secondary section.

The Vidyalaya works in two shifts. The first shift goes from 7:00am–12:25pm with 3 sections per class and the 2nd shift from 12:30pm–6:00pm with 2 sections per class. KV Malleswaram is one of the few chosen Kendriya Vidyalayas to have upgraded to "e-Classroom" and e-Learning teaching processes with the implementation of Smart Boards in the classroom. The Vidyalaya has set up "Atal Tinkering Laboratory" under the "Atal Innovation Mission" by the NITI ayog government of India. The objective of this scheme is to foster curiosity, creativity and imagination in young minds; and inculcate skills such as design mindset, computational thinking, adaptive learning, physical computing etc. The Vidyalaya encourages students to take part in various competitions which are conducted at school as well as on regional and national levels. For CCA activities and house contests, the students are placed into four houses: KALIDAS (Green), VYAS (Yellow), MATANG (Red), BANABHAT (Blue). The houses are named after famous (in Sanskrit literature) Indian poets and authors.

== See also ==
- List of Kendriya Vidyalayas
