= National Incentive Award (KVS) =

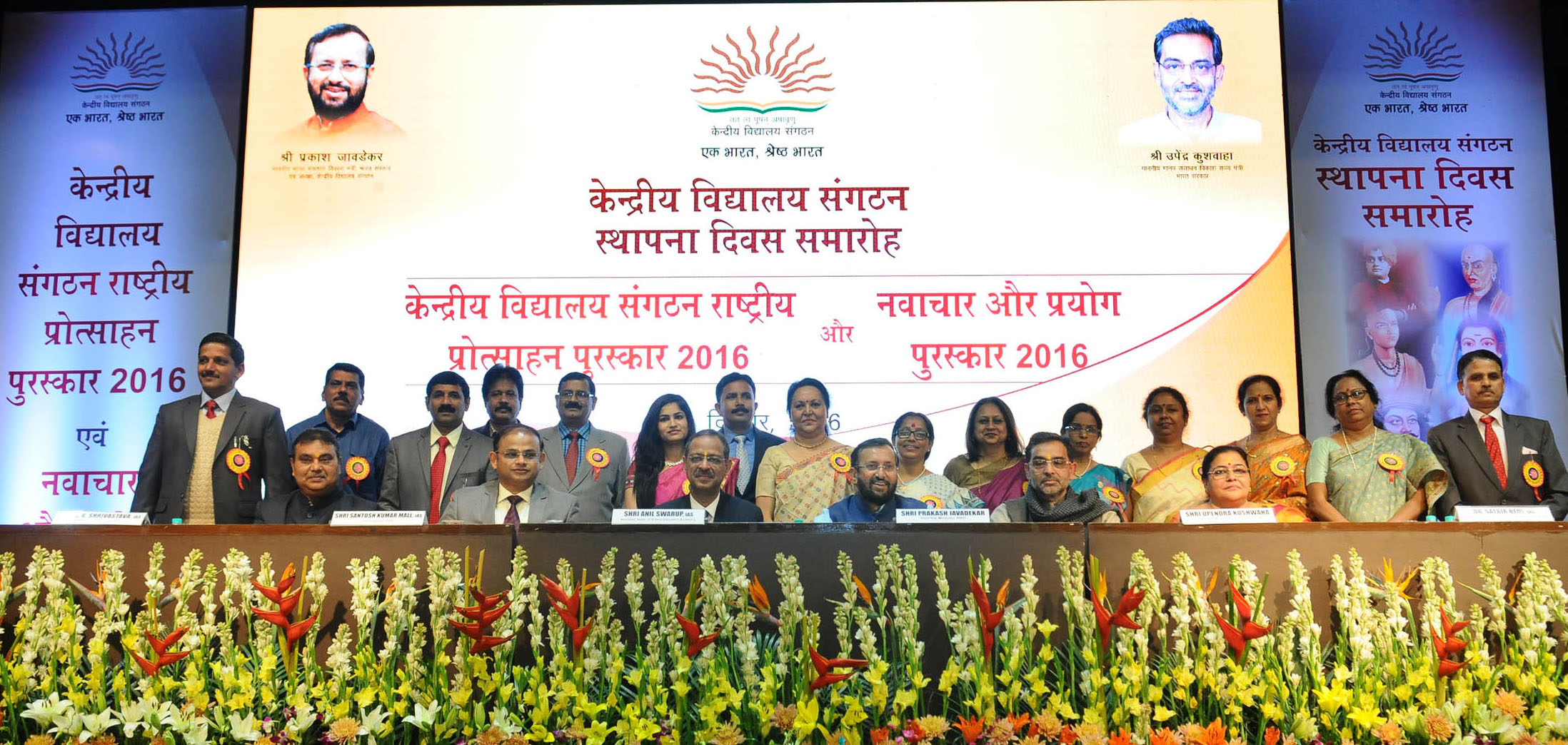
Education Minister Mr. Prakash Javadekar with the recipients of the KVS National Incentive Awards

National Incentive Award (KVS) is the highest award given by Kendriya Vidyalaya Sangathan at National Level for the exemplary and commendable work, to their 30 employees (25 Teaching and 5 Non-Teaching Staff) every year on occasion of KVS Foundation Day with the hands of the Commissioner, Kendriya Vidyalaya Sangathan (KVS).

== Process ==
An employee of KVS has to fill self nomination when portal opens. All candidates has to give presentation for 7–10 minutes about their achievements and contributions towards the students, organization and Nation, in front of Regional Level Independent Jury, and total approx. 99 i.e. 72 teaching and 27 non-teaching shortlisted qualified candidates will be forwarded to KVS (HQ) for the second round selection process by Independent Jury at National Level.

== Award ==
Total 30 Teaching and Non-Teaching staff are being selected for this award every year, which is being presented on KVS foundation Day (15 December). This award carries an amount of Rs. 20,000/-, Shawl, Memento and a Certificate.
