= Kendriya Vidyalaya, Jalahalli West =

Kendriya Vidyalaya No.1 Jalahalli West, Bengaluru
- Kendriya Vidyalaya No 1 in 2008

Location
- Bengaluru, Karnataka; India; 13°3′51.5″N 77°32′36.3″E

Information
- Established: 1964
- School board: Central Board of Secondary Education (CBSE)
- Authority: Ministry of Human Resource Development
- Principal: Ravindra S. Devadiga
- Area: Jalahalli
- Website: no1jalahalli.kvs.ac.in

Kendriya Vidyalaya, No.1, Air Force Station, Jalahalli West, Bengaluru, India is a school run by the Kendriya Vidyalaya Sangathan, an autonomous body formed by the Ministry of Human Resource Development, Government of India, New Delhi. Started in 1964, the Vidyalaya has classes from I to XII with an enrollment of 2300 with Science and Commerce streams at the Plus-Two level.

== Operations ==
The school follows the Central Board of Secondary Education (CBSE) curriculum, with a 10+2 pattern of education. and follows the 10+2 pattern of education.

Students take part in co-curricular activities, sports and games, club activities, work experience, Scouts and Guides, National Cadet Corps (NCC), computer education, vocational training, adventure programmes and value education

The Principal of the school is Mr. Ravindra S Devadiga. The Head Mistress of the school is Mrs. P Sudha.

== See also ==
- Kendriya Vidyalaya Sangathan
- List of Kendriya Vidyalayas
