= Kendriya Vidyalaya, Raebareli =

Kendriya Vidyalaya Raebareli
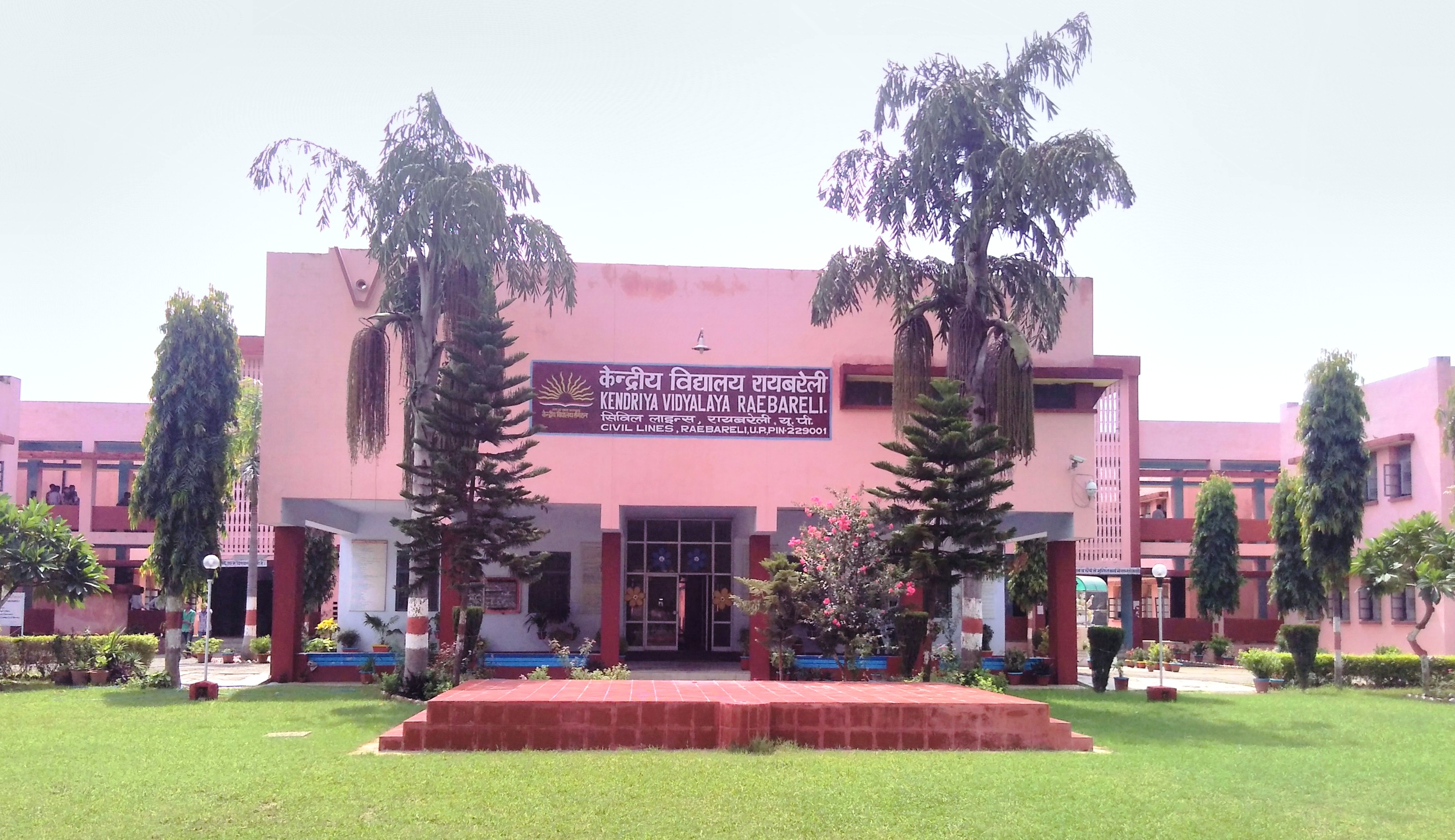
- Main Building of Kendriya Vidyalaya Raebareli

Location
- Raebareli; Uttar Pradesh; India; 26.211029°N 81.255366°E

Information
- Other name: KVRBL
- School type: Public Sector
- Motto: Tat vam Pooshan Apaavrunu (Lord Remove the covering so that the Seeker may see the Truth)
- Established: 8 April 1973
- Founder: Indira Gandhi
- Sister school: All Kendriya Vidyalayas across India
- School board: CBSE
- Authority: MHRD, Kendriya Vidyalaya Sangathan
- Chairman: Vaibhav Srivastava, IAS District Magistrate Raebareli
- Principal: Ssnjeev Kumar Agarwal (09/11/2017 - )
- Classes offered: I-XII
- Language: English, Hindi
- Campus type: co-educational
- Houses: Subhash, Tagore, Ashoka, Raman
- Colors: Maroon(school colour), Blue, Green, Yellow and Red
- Website: raebareli.kvs.ac.in

Kendriya Vidyalaya Raebareli is a school in Raebareli run by Kendriya Vidyalaya Sanghathan, an autonomous body under the Ministry of HRD. The school is affiliated to CBSE. A civil sector Kendriya Vidyalaya, the school is situated in the peaceful area of Civil Lines Raebareli. The school is roughly at half a mile distance from the NH 30 connecting Lucknow and Allahabad. It was inaugurated in 1973 and two other Kendriya Vidyalaya in Raebareli District.

== History ==
Inauguration of Kendriya Vidyalaya Raebareli by Smt. Indira Gandhi on 8 April 1973

Kendriya Vidyalaya Raebareli was inaugurated by then Prime Minister of India Smt. Indira Gandhi on 8 April 1973. She was also the Member of Parliament from Rae Bareli (Lok Sabha constituency) at that time. The school was the first central government sponsored school in Raebareli and remained the only one before Jawahar Navodaya Vidyalaya was established in 1986 in Maharajganj, Raebareli.

The primary (Classes I-V) building of the school is located near ITI, Raebareli and was established in year 1987. Since the academic session of 2011-12 the school has started operating in two shifts.

== Administration ==
Kendriya Vidyalaya Raebareli is one of the 43 schools under the Kendriya Vidyalaya Sangathan(KVS) Lucknow Region. KVS Lucknow region is one of the 25 regions under the Kendriya Vidyalaya Sangathan. According to the latest guidelines by Kendriya Vidyalaya the school must constitute a Vidyalaya Management Committee(VMC) for its general supervision and day-to-day management. As the Vidyalaya is located in civil sector District Magistrate Raebareli serves as the Chairman of VMC and roughly have 15 members. Shri. Surya Pal Gangwar District Magistrate Raebareli is currently the chairman of VMC.
The principal serves as the administrative head of the school. The vice-principal of the school assists the principal in matters of academic co-ordination and maintenance of school, who works under the overall guidance of the principal. The headmaster is responsible for running primary sections under the overall guidance of the principal and serves as a supervisor of the Primary Department.

== Academics and facilities ==
The school is operated in two shifts, namely Kendriya Vidyalaya Raebareli Shift-I and Kendriya Vidyalaya Raebareli Shift-II. The shift I operate from 07:00 AM to 12:30 PM, while Shift II from 12:30 PM to 06:00 PM. The same infrastructure is used by both the shifts and the teachers as well other staff are different for both the shifts, but Shri Brij Lal currently acts as the principal of both the shifts.
Classes offered here are from I to XII. There are five sections for I class to X class, with the fifth section being approved in August 2009. Three streams Science, Humanities, and Commerce are offered at the Senior Secondary level (Class XI-XII). The school has 59 classrooms along with separate rooms for extracurricular and co-curricular activities like art, S.U.P.W., music, yoga, and Scout & Guide. Physics, Chemistry and Biology Laboratories are present for scientific experimentation and measurement. Junior Science Lab and Computer Labs are also there to assist students in understanding elementary science and computer education. The school has a shooting range and a room for other indoor games, such as chess, carrom, and table tennis. Grounds, field, and other facilities exist for outdoor games like volleyball, football, hockey, basketball, handball, kho-kho, kabaddi, and badminton.

== Faculty ==
The school has teaching staff in three categories: Post-Graduate Teachers (PGTs), Trained Graduate Teachers (TGTs) and Primary Teachers (PRTs). There are 75 teachers in Shift I and 25 teachers in Shift II along with other supporting staff.

== Gallery ==
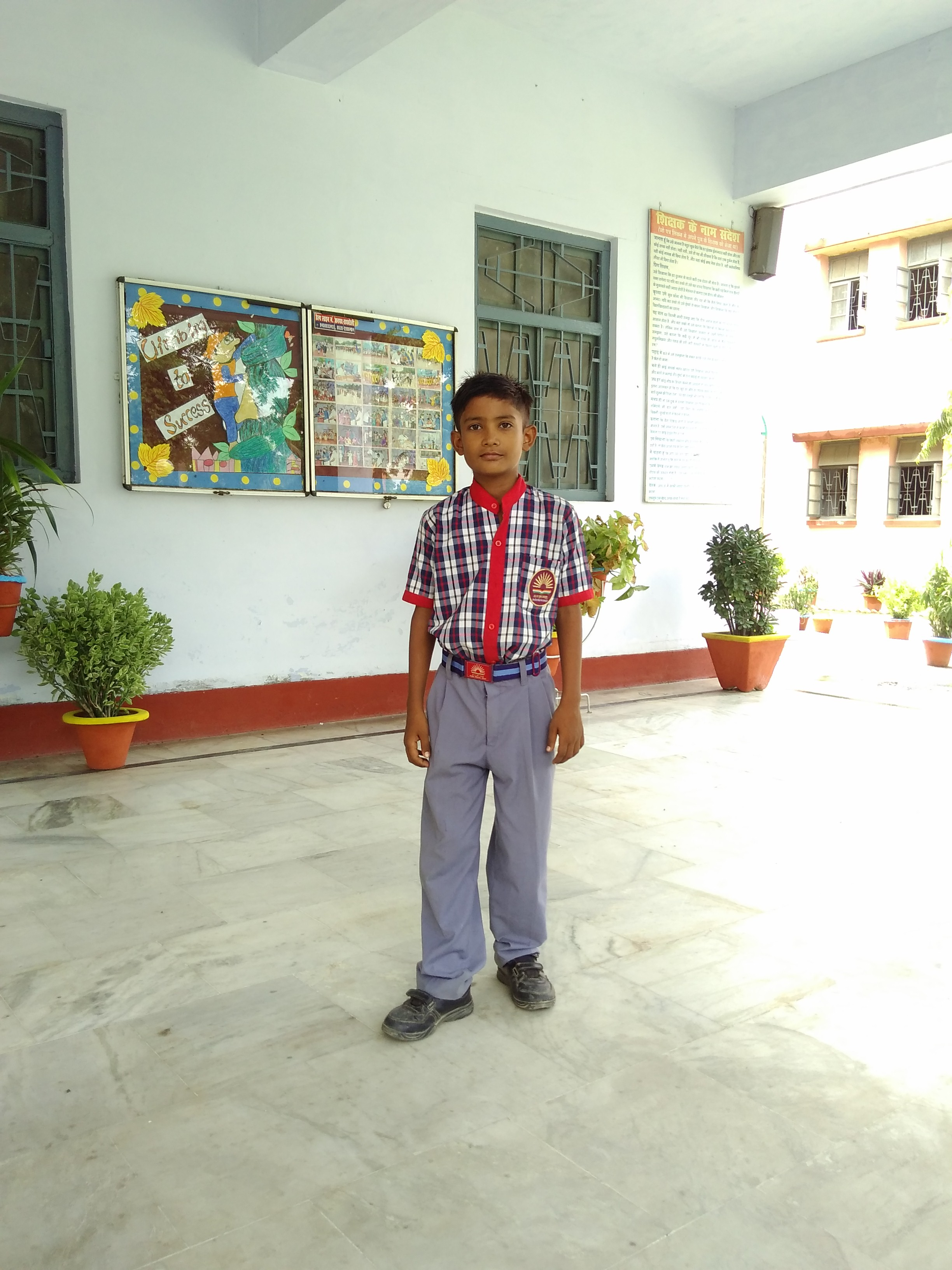
School Uniform of Kendriya Vidyalaya Raebareli

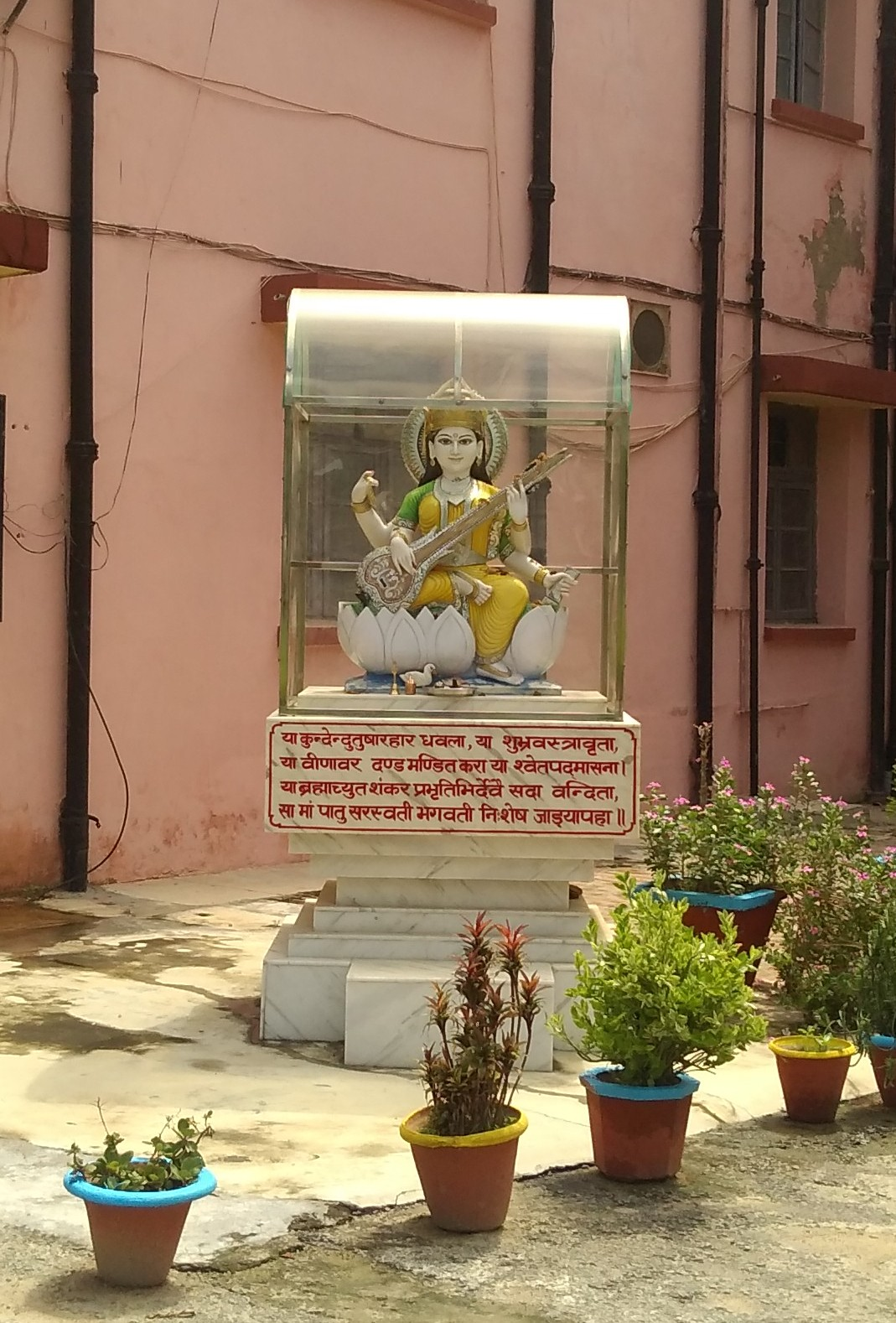
Statue of Goddess Saraswati at Kendriya Vidyalaya Raebareli

== See also ==
- Central Board of Secondary Education
- List of Kendriya Vidyalayas
- NCERT
