= Kendriya Vidyalaya Bambolim =

Coordinates: 15.472°N 73.866°E

K V Bambolim is a Kendriya Vidyalaya in the 3TTR, 5TTR and 2STC army camp, in Bambolim, Goa, India. Nested in the mountains of Bambolim, it has a panoramic view of the city of Panaji. The school has sports, academics and other curricular activities.

Sprawling over seven acres of land, Kendriya Vidyalaya Bambolim Camp is situated in the surroundings of Bambolim in the Army Camp, near GMC, along NH-17, only 5 km away from Panaji.

Started in 1984 up to class V, it caters to the educational needs of the children of defence personnels, state and central government employees and others. It is a double section school running classes from I to XII (Commerce and Science stream).

== Administration ==
The school begun functioning in the academic year of 1984-85. The hierarchy of the school consists of a Principal, Vice Principal and other staff (teaching and non teaching). The present principal is Sri Patil R A since 11 August 2017. The school has a Chairman, held by the Commanding Officer, 3TTR, 5TTR and 2STC. The Chairman presides over the PTA meetings. The Chairman is Brigadier A K Sharma, Commandant 2STC.

Starting from 2010, the school has a Student Council consisting of the School Captains, Vice Captains, Sports Captains, House Captains, Vice Captains, Sports Captains all elected by the students of the school. The Captains are selected from the senior most class while the Vice Captains are selected from the second senior most class.

The school falls under the Mumbai region of the KVS for all purposes, including examinations and inter-school competitions. The Secondary and Post-Secondary examinations in the Tenth and Twelfth standards are held under the Chennai region.

== Academics ==
The staff of the school consists of permanent and temporary teachers. The school follows the syllabus accorded by the CBSE. The school offers Science and Commerce at the pre university level.

== Curricular activities ==
Every Friday the students from the four houses compete against their peers in activities such as debates, dance, elocution, declamation, mimes, group dance, and quizzes.

Apart from the inter-house competitions the students participate with other Kendriya Vidyalayas in Regional and National Level science and social science fairs that are held each year. The school has a Scouts and Guides unit.

Being central government affiliated the school has grand celebrations on national holidays of significance such as 26 January (Republic Day) and 15 August (Independence Day). Every year the students celebrate Teacher's Day on 5 September.

== Infrastructure ==
The school building is divided into the Primary (1st to 5th grade) Secondary (6th to 10th grade) and Higher secondary/ Pre -University (11th and 12th Grade). Addressed inside the army camp with a huge campagna set aside to it, the school has a multipurpose ground which can be used for track and field, soccer and cricket. There is an outdoors basketball court, volleyball court and a badminton court within the school campus as well as a park with swings and slides for the primary block children. There is a kabaddi ground, and a long jump pit but all of them are out of order and no action is taken by the administrators to set them right.

== See also ==
- Kendriya Vidyalaya
- List of Kendriya Vidyalayas
- CBSE
- NCERT
