= Kendriya Vidyalaya, Bantalab =

- केंद्रीय विद्यालय बॉनतालाब

Location
- GC, CRPF Campus, Bantalab; Jammu, Jammu and Kashmir, 181123; India; 32.77°N 74.82°E

Information
- Other name: K.V Bantalab
- School type: Government Senior secondary school
- Founded: 1976
- Status: Active
- Educational authority: Central Board of Secondary Education
- Principal: Varsha Jain
- Language: Hindi, English
- Website: crpfbantalab.kvs.ac.in

Kendriya Vidyalaya (CRPF), Bantalab is a school in Jammu and part of the Kendriya Vidyalayas in India. It was founded in 1976. The school is affiliated to the Central Board of Secondary Education. The school has classes for 1-12 and a class for upper kindergarten students named as Balvatika - 3. Kendriya Vidyalaya was shifted to its newly constructed building on September 9, 2002 which is situated near the campus of CRPF, on the Jammu-Ambh-Gharota-Road. It was inaugurated by the Commissioner (KVS, New Delhi) H. M. Caire. The principal of the school is currently Manoj Kumar.

== Controversy ==
In August 2022, Kendriya Vidyalaya Bantalab suspended student Karanveer Singh for allegedly damaging school property. His family and the Yuva Rajput Sabha (YRS) denied the claims, accusing the principal of harassment, threats, and wrongful expulsion. YRS demanded action, warning of protests if unresolved.

The then principal, Suraj Prasad, denied all allegations, stating the school functions transparently. The female staff member defended the administration, claiming the accusations were baseless and driven by personal vendettas, not genuine concerns about the school's conduct.

== See also ==
- List of Kendriya Vidyalayas
- NCERT
