= Kendriya Vidyalaya New Cantt =

Central government school in Prayagraj, Uttar Pradesh, India

PM Shri Kendriya Vidyalaya New Cantt
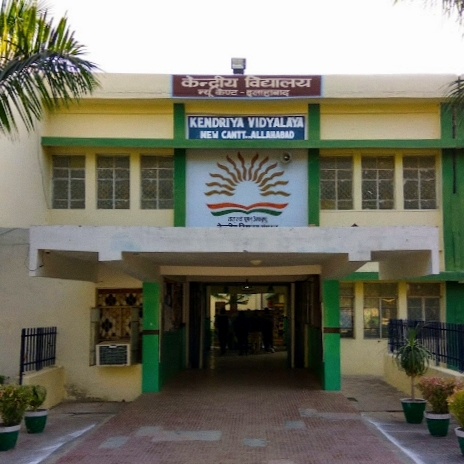

Location
- V.D. Road, Near Topkhana Bazar, Prayagraj, Uttar Pradesh, India; 211001
- Coordinates: 25°27′8.240″N 81°48′26.971″E

Information
- School type: Public
- Established: 10 July 1976
- School board: Central Board of Secondary Education (CBSE)
- Authority: Ministry of Education (India)
- School code: 74049
- Principal: Ravi Prakash
- Grades: 1 - 12
- Affiliation: Central Board of Secondary Education
- Website: https://newcanttald.kvs.ac.in/

Kendriya Vidyalaya New Cantt, Prayagraj is a co-educational central government school located in Prayagraj, Uttar Pradesh, India. It is administered by the Kendriya Vidyalaya Sangathan (KVS), an autonomous body under the Ministry of Education of the Government of India. Established on 10 July 1976, the school follows the curriculum of the Central Board of Secondary Education (CBSE).

== History ==
Kendriya Vidyalaya New Cantt, Prayagraj was established on 10 July 1976 under the administration of the Kendriya Vidyalaya Sangathan (KVS). The school was founded to provide a uniform standard of education to the children of transferable Central Government employees, including personnel from defence and paramilitary forces.

Located in the New Cantonment area of Prayagraj, the school offers classes from I to XII, with available streams in Science, Commerce, and Humanities at the senior secondary level. The curriculum is based on guidelines provided by the Central Board of Secondary Education (CBSE), similar to other Kendriya Vidyalayas across India.

In 2023, the school was selected under the Pradhan Mantri Schools for Rising India (PM SHRI) scheme. The scheme aims to develop selected schools into model institutions of quality education aligned with the National Education Policy 2020.

== Notable alumni ==
- Yash Dayal – Indian cricketer

== See also ==
- List of Kendriya Vidyalayas
