= Kendriya Vidyalaya, Rohtak =

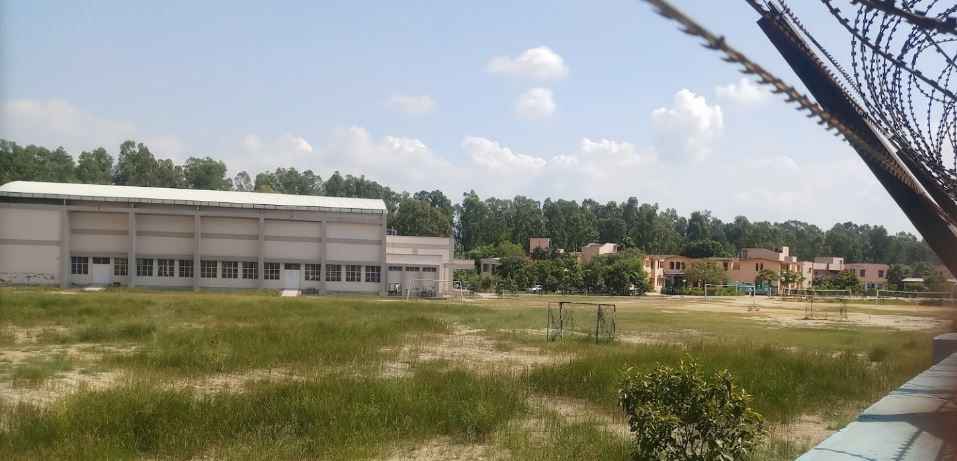
- Kendriya Vidyalaya Rohtak Campus

Location
- Near Delhi Byepass, Jhajjar Road; Rohtak, Haryana; India; 28.8762°N 76.6275°E

Information
- Established: June 1995
- School district: Rohtak
- Category: Senior Secondary School
- Oversight: Kendriya Vidyalaya Sangathan, New Delhi
- Principal: Paramjeet Kaur
- Headmaster: Sandeep Kumar
- Staff: 6
- Teaching staff: 38
- Grades: 1-12
- Gender: Mixed, co-education
- Enrollment: 1400 (approx.)
- Houses: Four (Ashoka, Shivaji, Tagore, Raman)
- Nickname: KVian
- Affiliation: CBSE
- Website: rohtak.kvs.ac.in

Kendriya Vidyalaya, Rohtak is a Senior Secondary School (Std 1-12) affiliated to the Central Board of Secondary Education (CBSE), New Delhi and functions under the purview of Kendriya Vidyalaya Sangathan (KVS), an autonomous government body. The Vidyalaya imparts school education up to class XII in the streams Science, Commerce and Arts. The school is divided into Primary section (Class I to V) and Secondary section (sub-divided into Junior Group – Class VI to VIII and Senior Group – Class IX to XII). The school conducts co-curricular activities by grouping students into four school houses: Shivaji, Tagore, Ashok and Raman.

== Establishment ==
School was established in 1995 and former chief minister of Haryana Om Prakash Chautala inaugurated it.

== Infrastructure Facilities ==
=== Multipurpose hall ===
A new multipurpose hall was built in the year 2017 for organizing special programmes and conducting various activities.

=== Classrooms ===
The Vidyalaya has 26 classrooms equipped with interactive board and multimedia projectors.

== Skill hub center ==
Kendriya Vidyalaya Rohtak is one of 500 schools of India, that are made skill-hub centers, under the Pradhan Mantri Kaushal Vikas Yojana, by Ministry of Skill Development and Entrepreneurship.

== See also ==
- List of Kendriya Vidyalayas
