= Kuzhithurai, Kanyakumari =

Kuzhithurai
- Town
- Location in Tamil Nadu Location in India
- Coordinates: 8°19′N 77°11′E
- Country: India
- State: Tamil Nadu
- District: Kanyakumari

Government
  - Type: Second Grade Municipality
  - Body: Kuzhithura Municipality

Area
  - Total: 5 km^{2} (1.9 sq mi)

Population (2011)
  - Total: 21,307
  - Density: 4,300/km^{2} (11,000/sq mi)

Languages
  - Official: Tamil, English, malayalam, tholu
- Time zone: UTC+5:30 (IST)
- Postal code: 629163
- Vehicle registration: TN-75

Kuzhithurai (also called as "Kullhithurai") is a town in Kanyakumari District in the Indian state of Tamil Nadu. It is the administrative headquarters of the Vilavancode Taluk. It is located 26 km (16 mi) north of the Nagercoil city and 42 km (26 mi) south of Kerala's capital city Thiruvananthapuram. It has a historical seaport (thura or thurai) where ancient merchants came from across the Arabian sea in ancient times. It is mentioned in ancient Indian maps. As of 2011, the town had a population of 21,307.

== Demographics ==
Religious census
Religion	Percent(%)
Hindu	40.57%
Muslim	3.91%
Christian	55.57%
Buddhist	0.02%
Other	0.09%

According to 2011 census, Kuzhithurai had a population of 21,307 with a sex-ratio of 1,022 females for every 1,000 males, much above the national average of 943. A total of 1,829 were under the age of six, constituting 922 males and 907 females. Scheduled Castes and Scheduled Tribes accounted for 1.45% and 0.02% of the population respectively. The literacy rate of the town was 94.07%, compared to the national average of 74.04%. The town had a total of 5,519 households. There were a total of 7,861 workers, comprising 171 cultivators, 615 main agricultural labourers, 238 in household industries, 5,573 other workers, 1,264 marginal workers, 27 marginal cultivators, 99 marginal agricultural labourers, 136 marginal workers in household industries, and 1,002 other marginal workers.

As per the religious census of 2011, Kuzhithurai had 40.57% Hindus, 3.91% Muslims, 55.57% Christians, 0.02% Buddhists and 0.09% following other religions.

== Geography ==
Kuzhithurai municipality spreads over an area of 5 km^{2} (1.9 sq mi). The Thamiraparani river (not the river flowing through Tirunelveli district) flows through Kuzhithurai.

== Historical importance ==
This town is famous for the annual Karkida Vavu Bali (Shradham for the ancestors held during the Mahalaya Amavasai) ceremony that is held here during July/Aug (Malayalam month Karkidakam). Along with the religious ceremony during this time, the famous annual exhibition fair - Vavubali Mela / Exhibition - was started by Shri. T.C Kesava Pillai, MLC from Kuzhithurai in the 1900s. Today this is continued by the Kuzhithurai Town Municipality.

The annual temple procession from Padmanabhapuram to Trivandrum stays overnight at Kuzhithurai per tradition started by the kings of Travancore. The famous Mahadevar temple is ancient built on rock foundation.

The Chitharal Jain Monuments; also known as Chitharal Malai Kovil (literally Temple on the Hill), Chitharal Cave Temple or Bhagwati Temple, Chitral; are situated on the Thiruchanattu Malai (Thiruchanattu hillocks) nearby Chitharal village. Chitharal hills are locally known as Chokkanthoongi Hills. The rocks show inscriptions of Vattezhuthu an extinct ancient Malayalam Tamil script.

== Tourist spots ==
Chitharal Jain Monuments: The Chitharal Jain Monuments are the ruins of a Jain training center from the 9th century CE, on a small hill. It has the famous Lord Shiva Temple and the hillock has a cave containing rock-cut sculptures of Thirthankaras and attendant deities carved inside and outside dating back to the 9th century. Among the rock-cut relief sculptures is a figure of the goddess Dharmadevi. Jain influence in this region was due to the King Mahendravarman I (610–640).

Mathur Aqueduct: one of the largest Aqueducts in Asia. It is one of the longest and highest aqueducts in South Asia and is also a popular tourist spot in Kanyakumari District. The Aqueduct is built across the Pahruli river, a small river that originates in the Mahendragiri Hills of the Western Ghats. Mathur Aqueduct itself carries water of the Pattanamkal canal for irrigation over the Pahruli river, from one hill to another, for a distance of close to one kilometre. This Aqueduct is necessitated due to the undulating land terrain of the area, which is also adjacent to the hills of the Western Ghats.

Mathur Aqueduct is a concrete structure held up by 28 huge pillars, the maximum height of the pillars reaching 115 ft. The trough structure is 7 ft in height, with a width of 7.5 ft. The trough is partly covered on top with concrete slabs, allowing people to walk on the bridge and also see the water going through the trough. Some of the pillars are set in rocks of the Pahrali river, though some of the pillars are set in hills on either side.

Road access allows one to drive into one side of the Aqueduct (up to one end), while it is also possible to drive into the foot of the Aqueduct (the level where the Pahrali flows) on the opposite side. There is also a huge flight of stairs (made in recent times) that allows one to climb from the level of the Pahruli river to the trough.

== Culture ==
Tamil is the local and official language in Kuzhithurai. People in this region are capable of speaking both Tamil and Malayalam. Christianity is the major religion, where one can find many churches around Kuzhithurai. Lord Shiva Temple near to post office is the old Temple in Kuzhiturai. On Monday, 22 December 2014, Pope Francis erected the new Roman Catholic Diocese of Kuzhithurai, with 264,222 Catholics and a total population of 855,485, out of territory taken from the neighbouring Roman Catholic Diocese of Kottar, and named the Rev. Fr. Jerome Dhas Varuvel, S.D.B., 63, until then a novice master for the Salesians of Don Bosco in the Vellore diocese, as its first bishop. Its headquarters will be at Holy Trinity Cathedral in Thirithuvapuram, and it will be a suffragan see of the Roman Catholic Archdiocese of Madurai.

== Notable people ==
- C. Sylendra Babu, DGP, Tamilnadu Police Department
- B Jeba Raja, Vice-President, Sanmar Group
