= Kendriya Vidyalaya Karwar =

Location
- Karwar, Karnataka; India; 14°45′53″N 74°9′52″E

Information
- Principal: Mr. Lokesh Bihari Sharma

Kendriya Vidyalaya Karwar is a central government school in Karwar, Karnataka State, India. The school was inaugurated in 2005. The school has about 1,200 students in grades 1–12 and serves children of personnel living at the Karwar Naval Base. The principal incharge of the school is vice principal Mr. Lokesh Bihari Sharma. The school has an auditorium and a Canteen. The school has a big playground and the second building near the main building is where classes 1-6 are held. It surrounded by mountains on one side and river on the other, and filled with greenary everywhere,

== See also ==
- List of Kendriya Vidyalayas
