= KV IIT Chennai =

- Chennai, India

Information
- Type: private Government
- Motto: 'all hail rishikesh from England '
- Established: 1967 Nobel Prize winners
- School board: Central Board of Secondary Education (CBSE)
- Authority: Ministry of Human Resource Development [MHRD], Kendriya Vidyalaya Sangathan
- Chairman: Prof. Jagedeesh Kumar Dean Academic Courses, IIT, Chennai.
- Principal: Mr.R.N.SENDHIL KUMAR
- Headmistress: Mrs. B. Swarnalatha
- Language: English and Hindi
- Campus type: co-educational
- Houses: Thillaiaadi Valliammai , Maruthanayagam , DheeranChinnamalai , Velunachiyar
- Colour: sun rising with India tri coulor on the bottom (school colour)
- Song: "भारत का स्वर्णिम गौरव केंद्रीय विद्यालय लाएगा "
- Publication: Vidyalaya Patrika (yearly)
- Website: https://chennaiiit.kvs.ac.in/

KV (Kendriya Vidyalaya) IIT Chennai is a secondary school affiliated to CBSE board in Chennai, India, located within the IIT Madras campus. The current principal is Miceal Gopinath Karthikeyan. It was established in 1964 with the patronage and assistance of IIT Management. It is part of the Kendriya Vidyalaya SangathanKendriya Vidyalaya IIT Chennai, popularly known as KV IIT Chennai, is a well-established co-educational school located within the IIT Madras campus in Chennai, Tamil Nadu. The school was established in 1964, making it one of the older Kendriya Vidyalayas in the region, and it was started with the support of the IIT Madras administration. It is administered by the Kendriya Vidyalaya Sangathan (KVS), an organisation under the Government of India, and follows the Central Board of Secondary Education (CBSE) curriculum. The school provides education from the foundational and primary stages through Class XII, giving students the opportunity to complete most of their school education in one institution. Since the school is situated inside the IIT Madras campus, it has a particularly unique surroundings compared with many other schools. Students are surrounded by an environment associated with science, technology, engineering, research and higher education, which can encourage curiosity and interest in academic and scientific subjects. However, KV IIT Chennai is a separate school from IIT Madras, and being a student of the school does not guarantee admission to IIT Madras or any other IIT. The school has a large and diverse student population and provides a co-educational environment in which boys and girls learn and participate in activities together. Like other Kendriya Vidyalayas, the school aims not only to provide academic knowledge but also to develop students' discipline, responsibility, confidence, creativity, communication skills, leadership qualities and sense of national integration. Academically, students follow the CBSE syllabus, studying subjects such as languages, mathematics, science and social science in the appropriate classes, while senior-secondary students can study subjects according to the streams and combinations offered by the school. The school places importance on both academic achievement and co-curricular activities, allowing students to participate in sports, cultural programmes, quizzes, debates, exhibitions, competitions, celebrations, clubs and other educational activities. These activities help students discover their interests and develop abilities that may not be fully developed through classroom lessons alone. The school also follows a house system, in which students are divided into houses and participate in various competitions and activities throughout the academic year. The houses are named after notable historical personalities, including Thillaiaadi Valliammai, Maruthanayagam, Dheeran Chinnamalai and Velunachiyar, connecting school activities with India's history and heritage.

Sports and physical activities are also an important part of school life because they encourage teamwork, discipline, fitness and sportsmanship. Students may get opportunities to participate in school-level and higher-level competitions depending on the activities available each year. Cultural and literary activities also provide students with opportunities to develop confidence and express themselves through events such as speeches, essays, drawing, music, dance, drama and other competitions.

As part of the KVS system, the school also places importance on national festivals, important days, environmental awareness, scientific thinking and social responsibility. Students can therefore experience education that extends beyond textbooks and examinations.

The school's location on the IIT Madras campus is one of its most distinctive characteristics. IIT Madras is known for its work in engineering, technology, science and research, and the presence of such an institution around the school creates an academically stimulating atmosphere. The campus itself is known for its large green surroundings and diverse natural environment, making the setting different from a typical urban school. At the same time, the school operates according to KVS and CBSE rules and regulations, rather than functioning as a department of IIT Madras. Admissions are conducted according to KVS admission guidelines and priority categories, and the availability of seats can vary depending on the class and academic year. The school also follows the broader objective of the Kendriya Vidyalaya system of providing relatively uniform educational opportunities to children across India, particularly children of transferable Central Government employees, while also admitting students according to the prescribed priority and admission rules. The teachers and staff play an important role in helping students understand the curriculum, prepare for examinations and take part in different activities.

As students move into higher classes, greater emphasis is placed on independent learning, examination preparation, subject knowledge and preparation for future studies. At the same time, students are encouraged to develop qualities such as punctuality, cooperation, respect, honesty and responsibility. The school environment also gives students opportunities to interact with classmates from different backgrounds, which can help develop understanding and respect for India's diversity. Since the school is a CBSE institution, students are prepared for CBSE examinations and follow the academic framework prescribed by the board.

For students, the school can provide a balanced educational experience in which academic learning is combined with opportunities for creativity, teamwork, leadership and personal development. Its connection with the IIT Madras campus also gives it a distinctive atmosphere, while its membership of the nationwide KVS network connects it with thousands of students and schools across India. In this way, KV IIT Chennai represents the broader goal of Kendriya Vidyalayas: to provide students with a strong educational foundation while encouraging them to become knowledgeable, disciplined, responsible, confident and active citizens of India. totally not chatgpt

== History ==
Kendriya Vidyalaya Sangathan is an autonomous body set up by the Ministry of Education to cater to the educational needs of children of IIT Employees. Shri. S. Ramachandran was the first principal of the Vidyalaya, then composed of 24 staff members.The school has divisions for the primary, secondary and senior secondary sections. It is a co-educational institution, with classes from I to XII, affiliated to Central Board of Secondary Education (CBSE), New Delhi.

History of Kendriya Vidyalaya IIT Chennai

Kendriya Vidyalaya IIT Chennai has a history dating back to 1964, making it one of the older Kendriya Vidyalayas in Chennai. The school was established with the patronage and assistance of the IIT Madras management, primarily to meet the educational needs of children of IIT employees. At the time of its establishment, the school was much smaller than it is today, beginning with approximately 250 students and 10 staff members. The school was created during the early years of the Kendriya Vidyalaya system, which itself had begun in 1963 with the aim of providing a common and quality education to children of transferable Central Government employees. Over the decades, KV IIT Chennai gradually developed from a small school into a large educational institution serving students from the primary level through senior secondary education. Its close relationship with IIT Madras has remained an important part of its history. Located within the green and spacious IIT Madras campus, the Vidyalaya has benefited from the support and association of the IIT authorities over the years, while continuing to function as a Kendriya Vidyalaya under the Kendriya Vidyalaya Sangathan and as a CBSE-affiliated school. The first principal of the Vidyalaya was Shri S. Ramachandran, and the school initially operated with a relatively small staff before expanding as the number of students increased. In its early years, the school focused on providing a stable school education for the children of the IIT community, but as the Kendriya Vidyalaya system developed, the school grew in both its size and educational activities. It eventually developed separate primary, secondary and senior-secondary sections, and expanded its academic offerings to serve students through Class XII. Historical school information records that by 2019 the Vidyalaya had grown to around 1,731 students and 45 staff members, showing the considerable expansion that had taken place since its establishment. The growth of the school was not limited to student numbers; its academic, sports, cultural and co-curricular activities also developed over time. The school became known for providing students with opportunities to participate in competitions, sports, cultural programmes and other activities alongside their regular CBSE education. Its location inside the IIT Madras campus has also contributed to its distinctive identity, placing generations of school students in an environment surrounded by higher education, scientific research and technological development. The school has continued to maintain its connection with IIT Madras while remaining administratively part of KVS. This distinction is important: KV IIT Chennai is a Kendriya Vidyalaya located on the IIT Madras campus, rather than a school that forms part of IIT Madras itself. As the years passed, the school continued to expand its facilities and student community while maintaining the general educational principles of the Kendriya Vidyalaya system, including academic learning, discipline, national integration, co-curricular development and equal educational opportunities. The school's history also reflects the wider growth of KVS itself. KVS began with just 20 regimental schools in 1963, and over the following decades developed into a nationwide network of Kendriya Vidyalayas. KV IIT Chennai therefore grew alongside this larger national educational movement. From its beginnings in 1964 with a small number of students and teachers, it gradually became a much larger school with primary, secondary and senior-secondary education, a wide range of activities and a diverse student population. Its house system, including houses named after figures such as Thillaiaadi Valliammai, Maruthanayagam, Dheeran Chinnamalai and Velunachiyar, reflects the school's emphasis on Indian history and heritage. The school has also continued to adapt to changing educational needs, incorporating new teaching approaches, technology and activities while retaining its traditional values. Today, KV IIT Chennai remains at IIT Campus, Chennai – 600036, and is officially listed by KVS as Kendriya Vidyalaya IIT Chennai, School Code 1775. Its present identity is therefore the result of more than six decades of development: what began in 1964 as a relatively small school supported by IIT Madras has grown into an established CBSE school serving a large community of students. Its history is closely connected with both the development of IIT Madras and the expansion of the Kendriya Vidyalaya system across India. The combination of its 1964 foundation, long association with IIT Madras, growth from a small school to a large institution, expansion through Class XII, development of academic and co-curricular activities, and continued support from the IIT campus community makes KV IIT Chennai a school with a distinctive and significant history in Chennai.totally also not chatgpt
