= Kendriya Vidyalaya, Pangode =

Secondary school in Thirumala, India

PM SHRI Kendriya Vidyalaya Army Cantt., Pangode
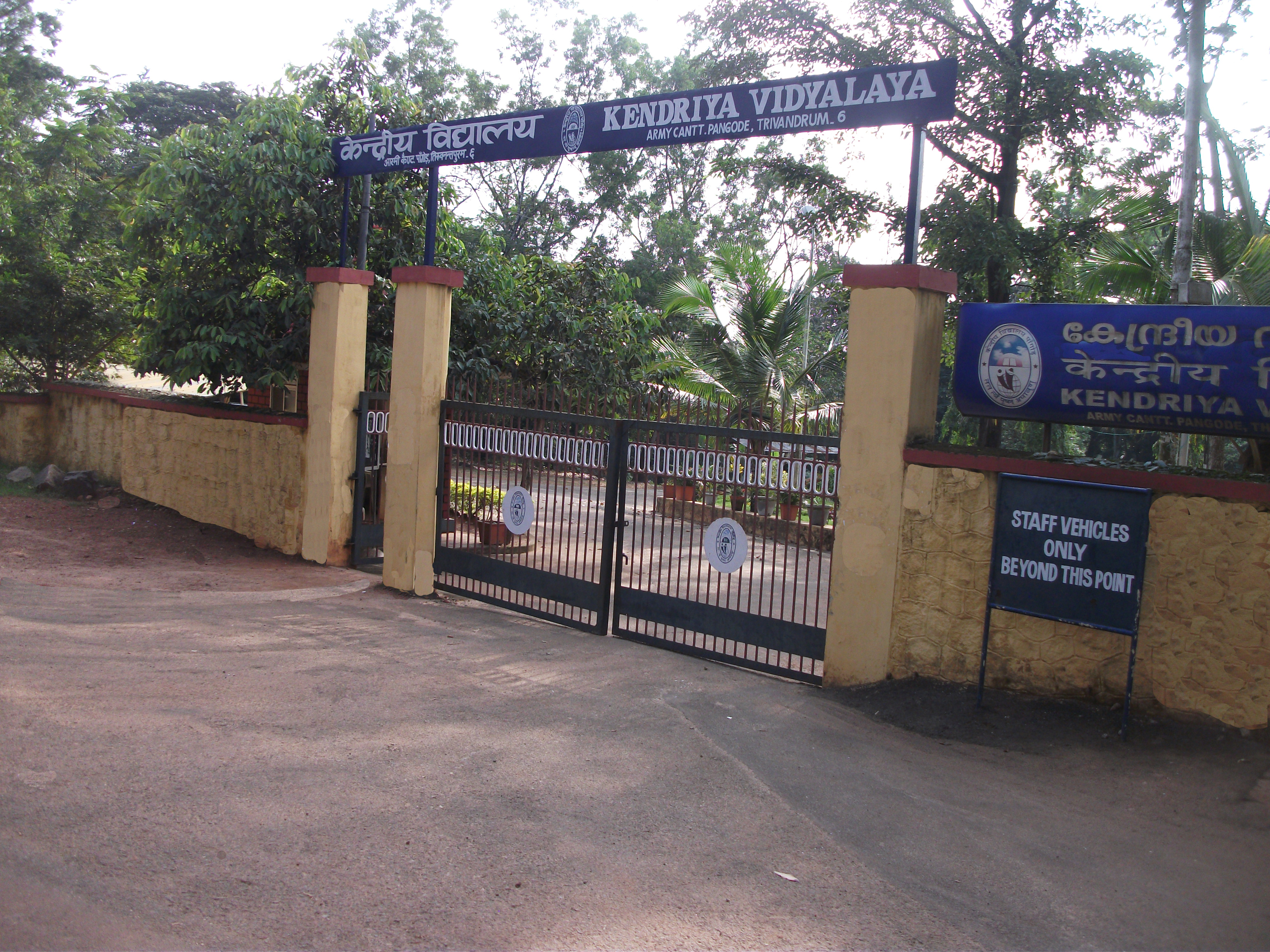
- Front view of KV Pangode

Location
- Pangode, Thiruvananthapuram, Kerala, India; South India; Thiruvananthapuram, Kerala, 695006; India
- Coordinates: 8°30′N 76°59′E

Information
- School type: Central Government senior secondary school
- Motto: Tattvaṃ Pūṣanapāvṛṇu (Sanskrit: तत्त्वं पूषनपावृणु) ("The face of Truth is covered by a golden vessel, Remove Thou, O Sun, that covering, for the law of Truth to behold.")
- Established: 1980
- Authority: Ministry of Human Resource Development (India)
- Chairman: Brig. Adish Yadav
- Principal: Shri. Rakesh K
- Headmistress: Rammohan.K
- Staff: 53
- Teaching staff: 46
- Enrollment: 1926 (30-9-2013)
- Language: English and Hindi
- Campus: Sub-urban
- Campus size: 7.5 acres (30,000 m^{2})
- Campus type: Co-educational
- Houses: Ashoka Ramanujan Tagore Shivaji
- Colours: Blue, orange, green, grey, yellow and red
- Song: "Bharat Ka Svarnim Gaurav Kendriya Vidyalaya Layega"
- Sports: Football, cricket, volleyball, basketball, badminton, swimming and kho-kho
- Nickname: Pangodians, KVians
- Affiliations: CBSE, Kendriya Vidyalaya Sangathan
- Highest grade: XII (Science, Commerce and Humanities)
- Library volume: 12665 (on 31 August 2010)
- Website: http://www.kvpangode.nic.in/

Kendriya Vidyalaya Army Cantt. Pangode ( KV Pangode) is a co-educational central higher secondary school in Army Cantt. Pangode, Thirumala, Thiruvananthapuram, Kerala, India. It was established on 1 August 1980, under the Defence Sector. It operates from Monday to Saturday, with an 8:25 am–2:40 pm schedule. The principal of the school is Mr. Rakesh. K.

== Infrastructure ==
The school has classes I to XII, affiliated to CBSE, with three sections each in classes up to X and four section each in classes XI and XII. The Vidyalaya offers Science, Commerce & Humanities streams at XI and XII levels. The school has coaches for games and sports, craft teachers, computer instructors and spoken English teachers on their staff. There are labs for physics, chemistry and biology, and a Junior Science lab. There are three computer labs on the campus. From 2017, a new ATAL TINKERING lab has been developed to ignite curiosity in the minds of students and help them built the things of their dreams. The lab is facilitated with newest scientific equipments including a 3D printer. The school has a football court, a volleyball court, a basketball court and a playground.

== Subjects ==
Subjects studied include English, Hindi, mathematics, information technology, art, social science, Sanskrit and German.

Students in classes XI and XII are offered three streams: Science, Commerce and Humanities. Science stream is allotted for students with more than 7.6 CGPA in class X, 6.4 CGPA for commerce and 6 CGPA for humanities.

== Student Council ==
The Student Council is a body of student representatives consisting of Discipline captains, CCA captain, Swachhatha captains and Sports captain, led by the School Pupil Leaders assisted by Deputy School Pupil Leaders. Besides these representatives there are also house representatives consisting of the house captains and vice house captains for both boys and girls. They are in charge of controlling and conducting programs, school discipline, sports activities, and cultural programs and activities of the students.

== House system ==
All the students from class I and some of the staff are divided among houses: Ramanujan, Shivaji, Ashoka and Tagore. Each house is headed by a boy and a girl, and a staff member acts as the house master. Points are awarded to the students for co-curricular activities (CCA) through inter-house competitions in sports, dramatics, debates, quiz, art and music. At the end of the year, the house gaining the highest points is awarded the house trophy and the runner up is also rewarded.

== Clubs ==
- Literary Club
- Science Club
- Mathematics Club
- Readers Club
- Adventure Club
- Philatelic Club
- IT Club
- Eco Club
- Photography Club

== Sports ==
दया कर दान
English: Daya Kar Daan (KV Pangode Morning Prayer)

Audio sample
- K V Pangode Morning Prayer – Daya Kar Daan: file; help

The Vidyalaya has teams for basketball, football, kho-kho, volleyball, badminton and cricket, conducting training after school hours. Two students have gone to nationals. The school hosts the U-16 and U-19 cricket matches for cluster as well as regional level.

Sport/game	Infrastructure	Number
Basketball	Court	1
Cricket	Ground	1
Football	Field	1
Long jump	Pit	1
Volleyball	Court	3

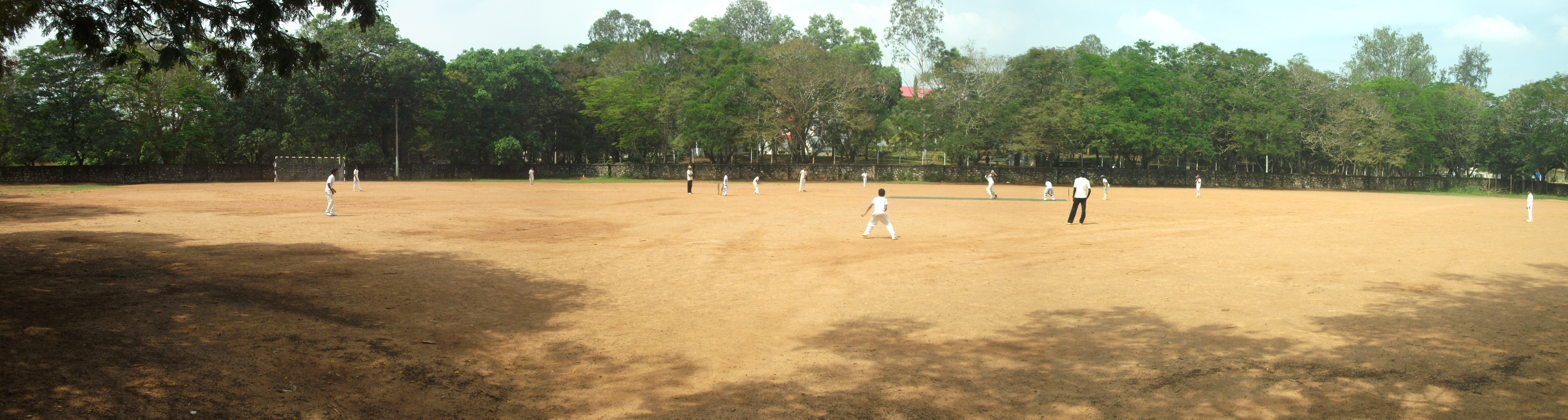
A cricket match in progress in the Vidyalaya ground

== Youth Parliament ==
A team from the school came first position in the 24th and 25th National Level Youth Parliament Competitions, organised by Ministry of Parliamentary Affairs. In the 26th Youth Parliament they emerged as the regional winners from Ernakulam Region.

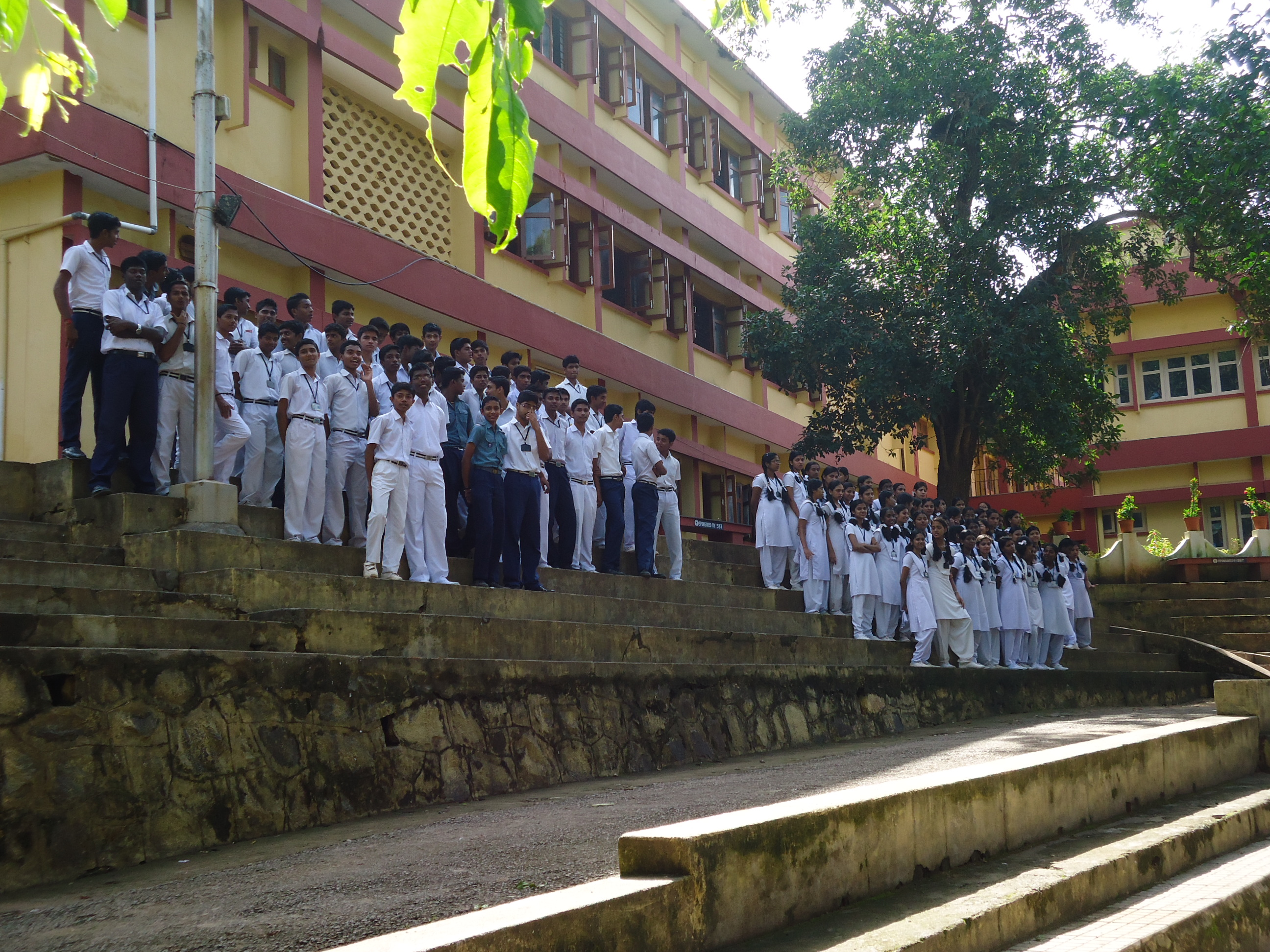
Senior secondary students standing for morning assembly

== Notable alumni ==
- Parvathi, actress

== See also ==
- Kendriya Vidyalaya Sangathan
- List of schools in Thiruvananthapuram
- Kendriya Vidyalaya, Pattom
- CBSE
