= Kendriya Vidayalaya Pandit Deen Dayal Upadhyay Nagar =

Kendriya Vidyalaya Pt. Deen Dayal Upadhyay Nagar
- Pt.Deen Dayal Upadhyaya Nagar, Uttar Pradesh; India

Information
- School type: co-educational
- Motto: Tattvaṁ pūṣaṇa apāvr̥ṇu ("The face of Truth is covered by a golden vessel, Remove Thou, O Sun, that covering, for the law of Truth to behold.")
- Established: 1976
- School board: Central Board of Secondary Education
- Authority: Ministry of Human Resource Development
- Principal: Mr. K.K.Bharty
- Staff: 76
- Enrollment: 2,587 (15 Nov 2019)
- Classes: I – XII
- Language: English
- Website: mughalsarai.kvs.ac.in
- Last updated: 15 Nov 2019

Kendriya Vidyalaya Pt. Deen Dayal Upadhyay Nagar is a co-educational school located in the town of Pt. Deen Dayal Upadhyaya Nagar. The school is affiliated to CBSE and has classes running from 1 to 12.

== Academic Activities ==
The school conducts various activities in the following :

=== Scout & Guide ===
Objectives :
To contribute to the education of young people through a value system based on the Scout/Guide promise and law to built [sic] a better world where people are self-fulfilled as individuals and play a constructive role in society.
Activity in Vidyalaya :

1. Pravesh investiture held in the month of July/August.
2. Pratham sopan testing is completed/performed in the month of August / September.
3. Dwitiya sopan testing is performed/ held in the month of September/October.

These testing camps are organized as per KVS R/O and H/Q orders/letters.

1. Tritiya sopan
2. Rajya Puraskar
3. President Puraskar/Award

During the session, different activities are conducted in Vidyalaya as social work, tracking, two-night camp, cleanliness drivers, knotting, camping, hike, tent-making for 3–4 persons. Test for different Badges ( proficiency ) is conducted at Vidyalaya level.
Overall attention is given to make a truthful and honest citizen in the country.

=== Co-Curricular Activities (CCA) ===
Every year, students participate in many activities like –

- English Calligraphy Competition
- English Poem Recitation
- Drawing Competition
- Solo/Group Song & Dance Competition
- Debate
- GK & GS Quiz

=== Sports ===
Students grow their physical & mental fitness by playing sports and doing yoga respectively.
Following games are provided for students during sports period –

- Football
- Volleyball
- Basketball
- Handball

Students participate in Sports Competitions at Regional level, get selected for National level and SGFI.
