= Saraswathi Vidyalaya Matriculation Higher Secondary School =

Saraswathi Vidyalaya Senior Secondary School
- Vadapalani, Chennai, Tamil Nadu; India

Information
- Type: Co-educational
- Motto: Knowledge and Service
- Established: 1956
- Principal: (Mrs.) K.Saraswathi
- Staff: 75
- Grades: Kindergarten to Grade 12
- Enrollment: 1000+
- Campus size: Large
- Affiliation: [CBSE]

Saraswathi Vidyalaya Senior Secondary School is located in Vadapalani, a suburb of Chennai, in the Indian state of Tamil Nadu. The school was inaugurated in 1956 by the Congress Leader and then former Chief Minister of Tamil Nadu Thiru.K. Kamaraj. The Founder and Principal Mrs. K. Saraswathi received the Presidential award from the President R. Venkataraman. She also received the Silver Elephant award from President Dr. Shankar Dayal Sharma.

The school enrolls children from kindergarten to Senior secondary level. It is affiliated to the CBSE Central Board of Secondary Education from Std I to XII. The medium of instruction at Saraswathi Vidyalaya is English language, and one other language from Hindi or Tamil language, is offered.

== Branches ==
- Saraswathi Vidyalaya Matriculation School, 150, Choolaimedu High Road, Choolaimedu, Chennai 600 094
- Saraswathi Vidyalaya Matriculation School, Enathur-Kanchipuram
