= Throwball in India =

Throwball Federation of India
- Sport: Throwball
- Jurisdiction: National
- Abbreviation: TFI
- Location: House No. 336, Village Khera Khurd, Delhi - 110082
- President: Bala Bachchan
- Vice president(s): M.U. Murarkar; R.H.P Kumar; Karam Singh; J.L. Khurana
- Secretary: Naresh Mann
- (India)

== History ==
Throwball was introduced by Jagat Singh Chauhan and at the same year he organised the first national championships in Jind, Haryana with great contribution of Mrs Shashi Prabha. Mr Jagat Singh Chauhan was founder or father of handball, netball and Throwball in India.

== Current ==
Throwball is gaining popularity in India as a competitive sport and Indian authorities of the game were instrumental in organizing Asian level and later, World level Association for the sport. Throwball is a popular sport, played in gym class, colleges, and clubs in India. The Junior Throwball team of India visited Sri Lanka in 1982.
