= Throwball =

Ball sport

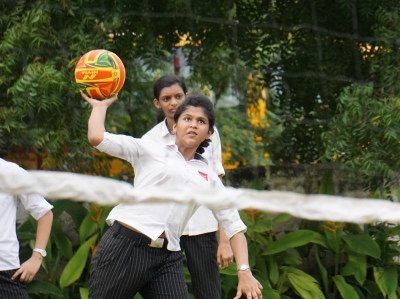
- Throwball at Silver Oaks International School, Visakhapatnam campus
- Highest governing body: International Throwball Federation (Since 2002)
- Nicknames: throwball
- First played: 1940s (first rules drafted in 1955) / ATF (1996)

Characteristics
- Contact: Non-contact
- Team members: seven players per team on court at once and five substitute
- Mixed-sex: Yes
- Type: Indoor or outdoor
- Equipment: Throwball

Presence
- Olympic: No
- Paralympic: No
- World Games: No

Throwball is a non-contact ball sport played across a net between two teams of seven players on a rectangular court.

Throwball is popular in Asia, especially on the Indian subcontinent, and was first played in India as a women's sport in Chennai during the 1940s. Like volleyball, the game's roots are linked with the YMCA. Throwball shares many elements with both volleyball and Newcomb ball. Throwball rules were first drafted in 1955 and India's first national championship of the sport was played in 1980.

The International Throwball Federation is the highest governing body for the sport.

== International Throwball Federation (ITF) ==
The Asian Throwball Federation (ATF) was established in 1996 consisting of 9 nations. The International Throwball Federation (ITF) was established in August 2002 in India.

Some events have been: a 1992 Asia competition and a 2000 world competition. The International Throwball Federation has been registered since 2008 according to SportAccord.

As of April 2026, the 72 members of the ITF consist of:

1. Asia (32 members): India, Sri Lanka, Bangladesh, Thailand, Malaysia, Nepal, Singapore, Indonesia, Taipei, Philippines, Pakistan, UAE, Bhutan, China, Afghanistan, Macau, Iran, Jordan, Oman, Mongolia, Saudi Arabia, Iraq, Cambodia, Japan, South Korea, Vietnam, Laos, Myanmar, Maldives, Kuwait, Qatar, and Bahrain.
1. Oceania (2 members): Australia and New Zealand.
2. Africa (17 members): Sierra Leone, Ivory Coast, Zimbabwe, Uganda, Cameroon, Tunisia, Nigeria, Egypt, Senegal, Seychelles, Mozambique, Benin, Tanzania, South Africa, Kenya, Togo, and Ghana.
3. Americas (4 members): Argentina, Brazil, Canada, and the USA.
4. Europe (14 members): Italy, France, Spain, Switzerland, Malta, Portugal, Belgium, Denmark, United Kingdom, Poland, Germany, Austria, Russia, and Greece.
5. Non-sovereign / special entries (3 members): Puerto Rico, Hong Kong, and Basque Country.

The ATF consists of 20 members as of April 2026, whom are:

1. Asia (20 members): India, Sri Lanka, Bangladesh, Thailand, Malaysia, Singapore, UAE, Nepal, Philippines, Nepal, Bhutan, China, Indonesia, Pakistan, Afghanistan, Taiwan, Macau, Iran, Jordan, Oman, and Mongolia.
- Americas (4 members): Argentina, Brazil, Canada, and the USA (represented by the [Throwball Federation Of USA -

tfusa.org]])

== Events ==
1. Asian Throwball Championship
2. International Throwball championships:
  1. Indo-Malaysia
  2. Indo-Sri Lanka
  3. Indo-Thailand
  4. Indo-Thailand (junior)
  5. Indo-Nepal
  6. Indo-Bangladesh
  7. Pentacular
  8. Tri-international

== History ==
According to the Throwball Federation of India (TFI), throwball is thought to be derived from an unnamed recreational sport popular among women in England and Australia during the 1930s. The YMCA brought the game to Chennai, where it was played as a women's sport in the 1940s.

Harry Crowe Buck, who founded the YMCA College of Physical Education in Chennai, drafted guidelines for throwball rules and regulations in 1955. The game reached Bangalore in the 1950s.

The Throwball Federation of India (TFI) was formed in 1985 after the Indian National Throwball Championship in 1980. By 1990, Throwball in India had developed separate competitions for both men and women.

Throwball is played in physical education classes, colleges, and clubs throughout Asia, and it has slowly been gaining popularity in other countries.

In 1985, the Throwball Federation of India (TFI) was formed.

1. 1989: First Indian National Championship
2. 1985 TFI was formed
3. 1995: Asian Throwball Federation (ATF) was established
4. 2003: International Throwball Federation (ITF) was established

== Indian Championship ==
Throwball Federation of India (TFI) - 44th Senior National Throwball Championship At Ara (Bihar) - 14th to 16th March 2024.

== Rules and play ==
Dimensions of a junior or senior throwball court

=== Court ===
The playing court is somewhat larger than a traditional volleyball court. It is 16.20 by 18.30 metres (53.15 ft × 60.04 ft) with a neutral box 2 metres (6 ft 6.74 in) on either side of the center. The height of the net is either 2.1 metres (6.89 ft) or 3.3 metres (10.83 ft).

=== Ball ===
The ball is similar to a volleyball, but may be slightly larger and heavier. In volleyball, the ball gets hit or volleyed throughout play. On the contrary, in throwball, the ball is thrown over the net. On the opposing side, a member of the other team tries to catch the ball and quickly throw it back across the net. On each side a person can hold the ball for 3 seconds and before they have to throw it back to the opponent.

=== Game Play ===
==== Teams ====
Throwball game

An official game is played between two teams of seven or nine players. A minimum of three or five substitute players are allowed for each team, which can make a maximum of three substitutions during a set. A team can take two time-outs of 30 seconds each during a set. The first team to score 15 points wins a set. A match is three sets.

==== Service ====
Service is within five seconds after the referee whistles and is done from the service zone, without crossing the end line. A player can jump while serving the ball. The service ball must not touch the net. Double touch is not allowed for receiving the service ball and players must stay in 2-3-2 position during the serve. A person can jump but while serving he cannot go beyond the line while jumping and serving. Additionally, while serving if the ball touches the end line of opponent then it is considered a foul.

==== Rally ====
During a rally, the ball must be caught with both hands, without any movement of the ball within the hands (dubs) and the ball should not have contact with the ground. The ball is thrown within three seconds after being caught, only from above the shoulder line and with one hand. A player may jump when throwing the ball. The ball is allowed to touch the net, however it is not allowed to touch the antenna. The player must maintain contact with the ground while catching the ball. Additionally, the ball is not to be touched by any part of the body other than the palm when catching or throwing (body touch). The ball can neither be shifted (passed) to the left or right nor deliberately pushed. Two players are not allowed to catch the ball simultaneously. While passing the ball, it may touch the net and bounce back into play via a rebound. You may continue to play off of a net rebound as long as the ball has not touched the floor. The rebounding rule does not apply to serves.

==== Uniforms ====
In official play, teams must wear shorts and a jersey uniform with numbers specifically within the range of 1–12. The number must be printed on the jersey's front and back. The number can be of any digit within the range.

== Major competitions ==
In India, the National Throwball Championship is organized by the Throwball Federation of India. A Junior International Throwball Match was conducted in Kuala Lumpur, Malaysia in December 2015; eight countries participated.

== See also ==
- Throwball in India
