= Kendriya Vidyalaya Sangathan =

System of schools in India

Kendriya Vidyalaya Sangathan (KVS) {Central Schools Organisation (CSO)}
- India

Information
- School type: Public, Co-educational
- Motto: Tattvaṁ pūṣaṇa apāvr̥ṇu ("O Sun, please uncover that (truth)")
- Established: 15 December 1963; 62 years ago
- School board: CBSE
- Authority: Ministry of Education, Government of India
- Commissioner: Vikas Gupta, IAS
- Campuses: 1,366 schools (1,363 in India and 3 abroad)
- Budget: ₹10,129 crore (US$1.1 billion) (FY2026–27 est.)
- Website: kvs.gov.in

The Kendriya Vidyalaya Sangathan (KVS) (transl. Central Schools Organisation (CSO)) is a system of central government schools in India. Governed by the Ministry of Education, Government of India. As of November 2026, it has a total of 1,366 schools in India, and three abroad, in Kathmandu, Moscow and Tehran. It is one of the world's largest chains of schools and the largest chain of schools in India. It is controlled by 25 Regional Offices and 05 ZIETs (Zonal Institute of Education and Training) under the KVS headquarters.

In April 2022, the Centre decided to remove an MP quota for KV students, invalidating parliamentarians' recommendations for admission to the schools.

== History ==
It is a system of central government schools in India and other countries that have been instituted under the aegis of the Ministry of Education and came into being in 1963 under the name Central Schools. Later, the name was changed to Kendriya Vidyalaya. It is a non-profit organisation. Its schools are all affiliated to the Central Board of Secondary Education (CBSE). Its objective is to educate children of the Indian Defence Services personnel who are often posted to remote locations. With the army starting its own Army Public Schools, the service was extended but not restricted to all central government employees.

A uniform curriculum is followed by schools all over India. By providing a common syllabus and system of education, the Kendriya Vidyalayas are intended to ensure that the children of government employees do not face educational disadvantages when their parents are transferred from one location to another. The schools have been operational for more than 60 years.

== Management ==
The Kendriya Vidyalaya Sangathan or Central Schools Organisation (as previously known), oversees the functioning of the schools with its headquarters in New Delhi.

== Schools ==
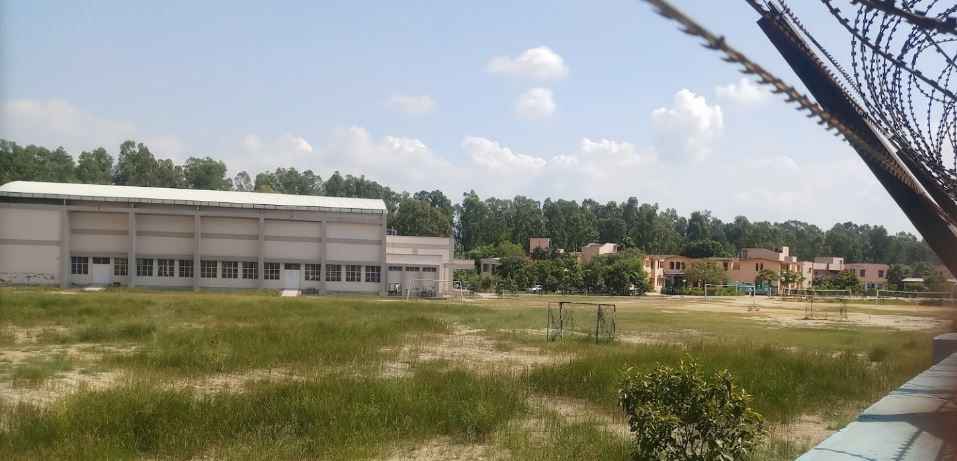
Campus of Kendriya Vidyalaya, Rohtak

=== Scale, Reach, and Global Presence of Kendriya Vidyalayas ===
As of November 2026, there were 1,366 schools named Kendriya Vidyalayas, having started with only 20 schools in the year 1963. It is one of the largest school chains in the world with 1,363 schools in India and three operated abroad. A total of 14,07,464 students (as of 31 October 2026) and 56,810 employees were on the rolls (as of 31 October 2026). KVS has been recognized as an independent State by Bharat Scouts & Guides Movement as around 2,60,701 students enrolled as the Scouts, Guides, Cubs and Bulbuls. Kendriya Vidyalayas are spread among 25 regions, each headed by a deputy commissioner.

=== International Kendriya Vidyalayas ===
The three Kendriya Vidyalayas outside India is in Kathmandu, Moscow, and Tehran situated inside Indian Embassies of these countries and their expenditures are borne by the Ministry of External Affairs. They are intended for children of Indian embassy staff and other expatriate employees of the Government of India.

=== Former International Schools ===
One school in Tsimalakha, Bhutan, was transferred to the Bhutanese Government, thus ceasing to be a Kendriya Vidyalaya (then known as Indo-Bhutan Central School (IBCS)) in 1989, after one of the major Indo-Bhutan projects (the Chukhha Hydal power project) was near completion. Indian Government employees were gradually transferred back to their own country.

=== Curriculum and Languages ===
All the schools share a common syllabus and offer bilingual instruction, in English and Hindi. They are co-educational. Sanskrit is taught as a compulsory subject from classes VI to VIII and as an optional subject until class XII. Students in classes VI to VIII could study the German language until November 2014, when the scheme was discontinued. But was again recontinued and is available in some schools until class 10. In Moscow, students are given an opportunity to choose French or Russian as their third or second language.

=== Fees and Exemptions ===
Tuition fees are charged for Kendriya Vidyalaya students have to pay the school development fund (Vidyalaya Vikas Nidhi), with the proceeds spent on the development of that particular school. Students from Scheduled Castes and Scheduled Tribes and children of KVS employees are exempt from tuition fees. Girls who are their parents' only child from class VI onward are exempt from tuition and school development fund.

=== Cultural Practices and Morning Prayer ===
A significant aspect of Kendriya Vidyalaya culture is the daily recitation of a common prayer during morning assemblies. This prayer, often delivered in Sanskrit or Hindi, includes the verse: "Daya kar daan vidya ka humein paramatma dena". Translation: "O God, be merciful and grant us the gift of knowledge." This ritual not only instills a sense of discipline but also reflects the educational ethos of seeking divine guidance in the pursuit of knowledge.

=== Admission Policies and the MP Quota ===
KVS also had the MP Quota which involved some special provision under which admissions are given. Members of Lok Sabha and Rajya Sabha could recommend a few number of students for the admission. These Special Provisions only worked in KVs located in the constituency of the MP concerned. All members of parliament could recommend up to six students from their constituency for admission to a Kendriya Vidyalaya. From the academic session 2016–17, the quota had been increased to 10 students. However, since the academic year 2022-23, all admission paths under special provisions like MP quota, quota of sponsoring agency (chairman quota) have been abolished.

=== Accreditation and Digital Initiatives ===
The Quality Council of India (QCI) has accredited three of KV schools: KV RK Puram, KV IIT Powai and KV Bhinga. The Kendriya Vidyalaya Gole Market school in Central Delhi has earned notice for upgrading to "E-Classroom" and e-Learning teaching processes with the implementation of Smart Boards in the classroom. This school produces an annual school magazine called Vidyalaya Patrika.

=== Sports, Activities, and Academic Diversity ===
The organisation is one of the few schools that offers all varieties in sports, games, activities and the largest scope of subjects offered by CBSE to its students. It is known for its holistic focus.

=== Awards and Recognition ===
It has been recognized with many awards by Government of India including the Rashtriya Khel Protsahan Puruskar in 2017 and Rajbhasha Kirti Puraskar on the occasion of Hindi Diwas in 2018–19.

== See also ==
- List of Kendriya Vidyalayas
- Central Board of Secondary Education
- National Council of Educational Research and Training
