= List of schools in Bengaluru =

Schools in Bengaluru

This page provides a list of schools in Bengaluru, India.

== Historical schools in Bengaluru and their year of establishment ==
- United Mission School (1832)
- St. John's High School (1854)
- Goodwill's Girls School (1855)
- St. Joseph's Boys' High School (1858)
- Bishop Cotton Boys' School (1865)
- Bishop Cotton Girls' School (1865)
- Cathedral High School (1866)
- Baldwin Boys' High School (1880)
- Baldwin Girls' High School (1880)
- St. Joseph's Indian High School (1904)
- Clarence High School (1914)
- National High School (1917)
- St. Germain High School (1944)
- Bangalore Military School (1946)

== Schools in Bengaluru ==
- Acharya Pathasala Public School
- Bangalore International School, Hennur
- Bangalore School of Speech and Drama
- Bethany High, Koramangala
- BGS National Public School, Hulimavu
- Canadian International School, Yelahanka
- Candor International School, Begur
- Charan's Public School, Ulsoor
- Cluny Convent High School, Jalahalli
- Daffodils English School, Sanjaynagar
- Eastern Fare Music Foundation
- Ekya Schools (6 campuses)
- The Frank Anthony Public School, Ulsoor
- Greenwood High International School (7 campuses)
- Innisfree House School, JP Nagar
- The International School, Bangalore, Sarjapura
- Inventure Academy, Whitefield
- Jain Heritage School, Hebbal
- Janaseva Vidyakendra Boys Residential School, Channenahalli
- Jyothy Kendriya Vidyalaya, Yelachenahalli
- Kendriya Vidyalaya, Hebbal
- Kendriya Vidyalaya, Jalahalli East
- Kendriya Vidyalaya, Jalahalli West
- Kendriya Vidyalaya, Malleshwaram
- Mahila Seva Samaja
- Mallya Aditi International School, Yelahanka
- Mysore Education Society Kishora Kendra School
- National High School, Basavanagudi
- National Public School, Indiranagar
- National Public School, Koramangala
- National Public School, Rajajinagar
- New Horizon Public School, Indiranagar
- Orchids The International School, Bengaluru
- Poorna Learning Centre, Sahakara Nagar
- Presidency School
- Sindhi High School, Hebbal
- Sophia High School
- Sri Gururaja Parents and Teachers Association, Thyagarajanagar
- Stonehill International School, Jalahobli
- TRIO World Academy, Sahakara Nagar
- United Mission School
- The Valley School
- Venkat International Public School, Rajajinagar
- Vidyashilp Academy, Yelahanka

== See also ==
- Category:Schools in Bengaluru
- Category:International schools in Bengaluru
