= National Public School educational institutions =

The National Public School (NPS) is one of India’s educational networks, founded by Dr. K. P. Gopalkrishna in 1959 in Bangalore. The New Indian Express included NPS in the top 20 best schools in Bangalore. NPS schools follow the CBSE curriculum, focusing on interesting and more studious than sporty curriculum.

== History ==
The National Public School group was founded in 1959 by Dr. K.P. Gopalkrishna, an educationist with a visionary approach to schooling. The first NPS school was established in Bangalore, Karnataka, and quickly gained a reputation for its focus on all-round development. The success of the initial school led to the establishment of multiple branches, both within Bangalore and other parts of India. Newer campuses and franchise schools, such as NPS ITPL (established in 2018) and NPS North (opened in 2022),NPS West (established in 2023) continue to carry the group’s legacy.

== Academic ==
NPS schools are affiliated with the Central Board of Secondary Education (CBSE). The academic programs emphasise not only subject proficiency but also skill development. NPS integrates a flexible and continuous assessment model that caters to diverse learning style,they are creating a dynamic environment for students from Kindergarten through Grade 12 (NPS West has no Grade 11 or 12).

== List of Schools ==
The NPS group operates numerous schools across Bangalore and other cities. Notable campuses include:

- National Public School, Indiranagar
- National Public School, Rajajinagar
- National Public School, Koramangala
- National Public School, Kalkere
- The International School Bangalore
- National Public School, HSR
- GMC HSR
- NPSI, Chennai (Perumbakkam)
- NPS Gopalapuram
- GMC Gopalapuram
- NPSI Mysore
- NAFL Basveshwarnagar
- NAFL North (Urbana)
- NPSI Singapore
- TISB Training Academy
- National Public School, Hosur Road
- National Public School, KR Puram
- National Public School, ITPL
- National Public School, Kalaburagi
- National Public School Jalahalli
- 'National Public School, West
