= National Public School, Rajajinagar =

School in Bangalore, India

National Public School, (Rajajinagar)

Location
- India; 34.5553°N 69.2075°E

Information
- Motto: Reach Out, Reach High, Reach Beyond
- Established: 1959
- Chairman: K. P. Gopalkrishna
- Principal: Sumitra Das, Malathy Narayan
- Grades: 1-12 + kindergarten
- Website: nps.com

National Public School (or NPS-RNR or NPS-R) is a school established in Bangalore India in 1959 by K. P. Gopalkrishna. The campus, which consists of four buildings, is located in Rajajinagar.

The school has been given full autonomy by the Central Board of Secondary Education. Classes generally consist of 30 children, and the total student strength is 1800 Act. In the same month, the Karnataka High Court granted a stay order on the disaffiliation of the school and restored full affiliation.

== House system ==
Students are divided into four houses which have been assigned a colour each. They are, "Orion" (green), "Centaur" (Red), "Pegasus" (yellow), and "Phoenix" (Blue). Every year, the houses compete for two trophies: the Sports Cup (awarded for athletics performance), and the House Cup (awarded for other merits such as drama, science, mathematics, etc). Each house has a house captain, who is elected by the students.

== Facilities ==
The school has two auditoriums. It has senior and junior science laboratories, a computer laboratory and other facilities like libraries, art rooms and a music room.

== Sports ==
There are sports events conducted for classes 1 to 12 and kindergarten. Cricket, volleyball, basketball, football and throw-ball are the permitted outdoor sports, along with badminton, chess and annual races.

== School events ==
The school organizes a bi-annual inter-school competition. The competition, known as "Napsonic", involves teams from only the sister schools competing to win prizes for events. To ensure fair play, the students of National Public School, Rajajinagar do not participate in the fests that the school sponsors.

Each year, the school organises a Graduation Day program to bid adieu to the graduating students of grade 12, during the course of which students hold lit lamps.

Intra-school and Inter-school MUNs knows as "R-MUN" have been conducted by the school since 2017.

== Sister schools ==
- National Public School, Koramangala
- National Public School, Indiranagar
- National Public School, Chennai
- National Academy For Learning
- The International School Bangalore
- National Public School, Mysore
- National Public School, HSR
- National Public School International, Singapore

== Notable alumni ==
- Ambi Subramaniam, violinist
- Ravi Chandran, Kannada film actor
- Bindu Subramaniam, Carnatic vocalist
- D. K. Shivakumar, president of Karnataka Pradesh Congress Committee
- D. K. Suresh, Member of Parliament, Bangalore Rural Lok Sabha Constituency
- Divita Rai, Liva Miss Diva Universe 2022
- Shashank ND, Co-Founder and CEO of Practo
