= BSSD =

BSSD may refer to:

- Bally Sports San Diego, American regional sports network owned and operated by Bally Sports
- Bangalore School of Speech and Drama, a drama school in India
- Bering Strait School District, in northwestern Alaska, United States
- Birmingham School of Acting, a drama school in Birmingham, United Kingdom
- Blairsville-Saltsburg School District, in Indiana County, Pennsylvania, United States
- Blue Springs R-IV School District, in Blue Springs, Missouri, United States
- Board solid-state drive, a cost-optimized implementation of an SSD in a different form factor
