= Isle of Innisfree (disambiguation) =

"Isle of Innisfree" is a 1950 song composed by Dick Farrelly.

Isle of Innisfree may also refer to:

- MS Isle of Innisfree (1991), a ro-pax ferry built in 1991 and operated under the Isle of Innisfree name from 2021 onwards
- MV Isle of Innisfree (1992), a ro-pax ferry completed in 1986 and operated under the Isle of Innisfree name between 1992 and 1995
- MV Isle of Innisfree (1995), a ro-pax ferry built in 1995 and operated under the Isle of Innisfree name between 1995 and 2002

== See also ==
- "The Lake Isle of Innisfree", an 1888 poem by William Butler Yeats
- Innisfree (disambiguation)
