= Vimala Rangachar =

Indian educationist (1929–2025)

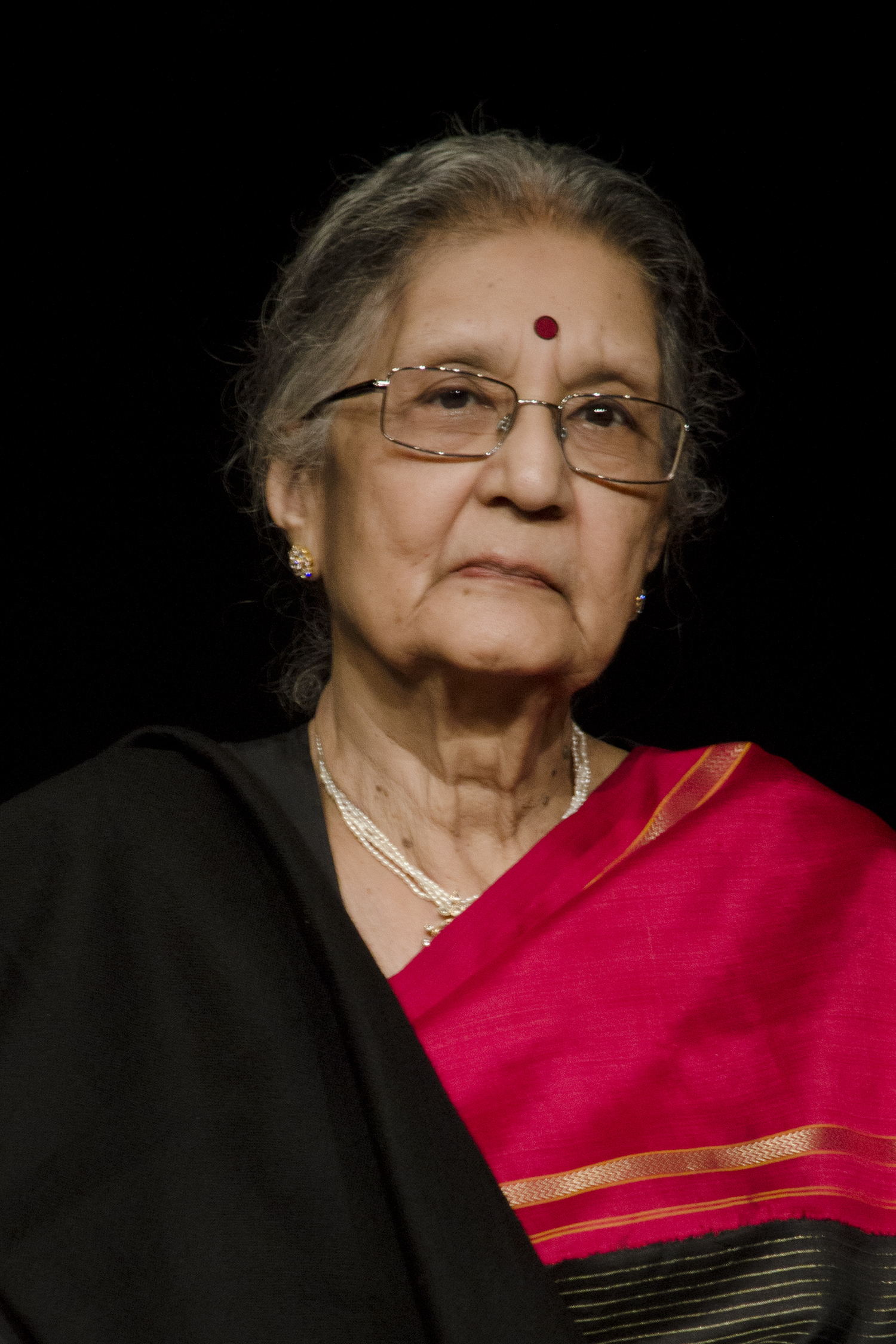
- Rangachar in 2014
- Born: 1929; Bangalore, Kingdom of Mysore, India
- Died: 25 February 2025 (aged 96); Bangaluru, Karnataka, India
- Known for: Contributions to fields of education, arts, and culture
- Parent(s): Ammanni Ammal and SK Ramanuja Iyengar

Vimala Rangachar (1929 – 25 February 2025) was an Indian educationist who was associated with the fine arts and performing arts conservation movement of Karnataka. She was one of the founding members of the Mysore Education Society and was a recipient of the Karnataka government's Rajyotsava Award for her contributions to the fields of education, arts and culture.

== Early life ==
Vimala Rangachar was born in 1929 to Ammanni Ammal and SK Ramanuja Iyengar. The family had roots in Bangalore's Malleshwaram neighborhood with her grandfather Venkataranga Iyengar being one of the founders of Malleswaram in the late 19th century. She developed an early interest in the arts and education.

At the age of 16, she married Dr. Rangachar, a doctor and army veteran who had served in Italy during World War II. Despite the early marriage, she pursued higher education, completing her graduate degrees in English and Psychology.

== Career ==
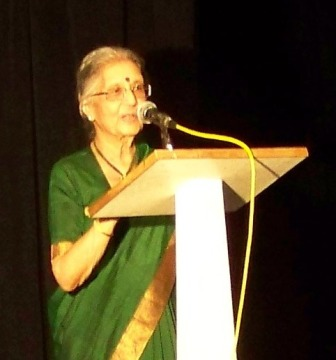
Rangachar in 2007

Rangachar was one of the founders of the Mysore Education Society (MES) in 1956. She led the society's build out of educational institutions, including schools and colleges, eventually chairing the organization for many years. At the time of her death in 2025, she remained an active member of its management committee.

Rangachar was an advocate for women's empowerment and co-founded the Malleswaram Enterprising Women’s Society (MEWS), a society focused on women's development. She also served as the president of Seva Sadan, a charitable organization that included children's orphanages. She took over this position from Lokasundari, the wife of Nobel laureate and Physicist C. V. Raman. She was also involved in the promotion of traditional Indian crafts and textiles, an interest inherited from her mother, Ammanni Ammal. Through this work, she was mentored by Kamaladevi Chattopadhyay and went on to lead the Karnataka chapters of both the Bharatiya Natya Sangh and the Crafts Council of India. Rangachar set up the first women's hostels in Malleswaram along with the daughter of Sarvepalli Radhakrishnan. The two had to register an organization to get partial funding from the Government and named the society MEWS because they used to call each other with a cat sounding "meow". They later came up with the name Malleswaram Enterprising Women’s Society.

Rangachar was also involved in theater, heading the Bangalore-based theater troupe Kalajyothi. It is noted that she was discontented with male actors portraying female roles, she took up acting herself, even involving her husband in performances. Some of the group's productions included plays by Kannada playwrights T. P. Kailasam and Pravatani. One of the group's productions was a hindi performance of Kailasam's Ammavra Ganda, where the attendees included Jawaharlal Nehru, India's first Prime Minister. She was also one of the contributing artists who set up the Amateur Dramatic Associates Theatre (ADA Rangamandira) on J. C. Road in Bangalore. In the early 1970s, Rangachar contributed to the setting up of Jawahar Bal Bhavan in Bangalore's Cubbon Park as a dedicated space for children's theatre. She toured the United States and the then USSR as a cultural ambassador of the country.

Some of her other positions included Chairperson of the Craft Council of Karanataka, Founder Member and President of M.E.S Institutions, President of the Natya Institute of Kathak and Choreography, President of the M.E.W.S Ladies Club, Malleshwaram, Bangalore, President of the Seva Sadan Orphanage, Hon. Secretary of the ADA Rangamandira, Committee Member, Gandhi Centre for Science and Human Values – Bharathiya Vidya Bhavan, and Chairperson of the Cauvery Handicrafts Emporium

Rangachar was the recipient of the Kamala Sanmaan in 2004 and also the Karnataka governments's Rajyotsava Award for her contributions to arts and culture.

== Personal life ==
Rangachar's daughter, Revathi, a classical dancer, lived in the United States. Rangachar lived her entire life in the Malleswaram neighborhood in Bangalore.

Rangachar died in Bangalore on 25 February 2025, at the age of 96. (Note: Sources mislabel her age as "97".)
