= Ganganagar, Bengaluru =

Neighbourhood in Bengaluru urban, Karnataka, India 560032

- neighbourhood
- Location within Bengaluru
- Coordinates: 13.021°N 77.588°E
- Country: India
- State: Karnataka
- Metro: Bengaluru

Languages
  - Official: Kannada
- Time zone: UTC+5:30 (IST)
- PIN: 560032

Ganganagar is one of the neighbourhoods of Bengaluru. It is in the north of Bengaluru and is on the east of NH-7 before Hebbal. Ganganagar is primarily a residential area and busy shopping area. Parachute Regiment School, Embassy, HMT Ltd run their business here.

Ganganagar is adjacent to R. T. Nagar and sees much activity as it lies on the route to the new International Airport in Bengaluru. A couple of fly-overs are there at some busy junctions (like Sanjaynagar and CBI). The rentals have shot up in Ganganagar recently as this has become a strategic real estate location. A lot of development is happening on the Bellary Road. A five-star hotel complex is slated to be built in the erstwhile Binny Mills compound. Ganganagar has a huge market area always bustling with activity. It also has four schools, they are GPS High School, Urdu medium government school, Kannada medium government school and Vaani English medium school.
