= Venkat International Public School =

Location
- 5th Block, Rajajinagar, Bangalore - 560010, Karnataka, India; 12.98221°N 77.55303°E

Information
- Type: Private
- Established: 1995
- Founder: T. Balakrishna
- Principal: Dr. Sulochana Balakrishna
- Grades: Nursery — Grade 12
- Campus type: Day school with international standard facilities
- Affiliation: CBSE
- Website: www.vips.ac.in

Venkat International Public School was established in 1995 and affiliated to the Central Board of Secondary Education, New Delhi. The present strength of the school is around 6000. It follows a curriculum based on CBSE pattern supplemented with co-curricular and extra-curricular programs. The school is managed by a group led by T. Balakrishna, serving as the Chairman & CEO of the institution.

Its group of institutions consists of Venkat International Public School, St. Ann's High School, and Venus International School.

== Curriculum ==
The curriculum has three programmes:

- Montessori to UKG
- Standard 1 to Standard 10
- Standard 11 and Standard 12

== Events ==
- World Record
- Go Green Day
- Yoga Day
