= St Joseph's Boys' High School, Bengaluru =

St Joseph's Boys' High School

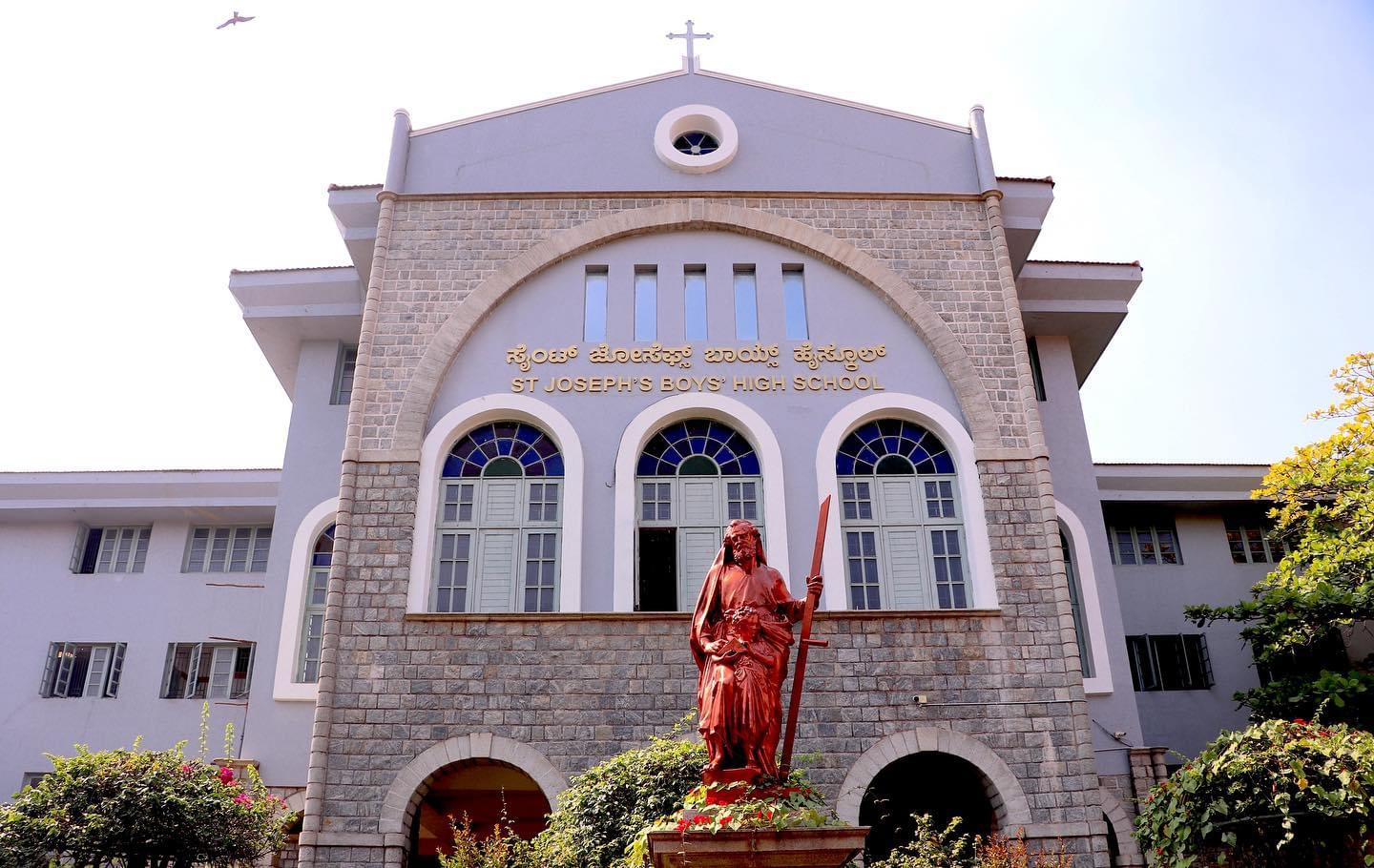
- SJBHS as seen in Dec 2023

Location
- PO Box 25003 #27, Museum Road; Bangalore, Karnataka; India; 12°58′15″N 77°36′13″E

Information
- Former name: St. Joseph's European High School
- Type: Private primary and secondary school
- Motto: Latin: Fide et Labore (Faith and toil)
- Religious affiliation: Catholicism
- Denomination: Jesuits
- Established: 1858; 168 years ago
- Founder: Missions étrangères de Paris (MEP)
- Principal: Fr. Norwin Pereira
- Gender: Boys only: LKG-10; Co-educational: 11-12 (since 2007)
- Enrollment: 3,300
- Campus size: 2.7 acres (1.1 ha)
- Houses: St. Andrew; St. David; St. George; St. Patrick
- Colours: Blue and white
- Publication: Josephite
- Affiliation: Indian Certificate of Secondary Education Examination (ICSE); Indian School Certificate examination (ISC)
- Website: http://sjbhs.edu.in

St Joseph's Boys' High School (formerly St. Joseph's European High School) is a private Catholic primary and senior secondary school located on Museum Road in Bangalore, Karnataka, India. Founded by the MEP (French Missionaries) in 1858, the school caters to boys only from kindergarten to Grade 10 and is co-educational in Grades 11 and 12.

The school's Annual Old Boys Day draws alumni from around the globe. The school's history is detailed by alumnus Christopher Rego in the book Faith and Toil.

The school hosts many activities such as Cadence, Aurum, Eucranium etc. The most popular being Phenomenon.

== History ==
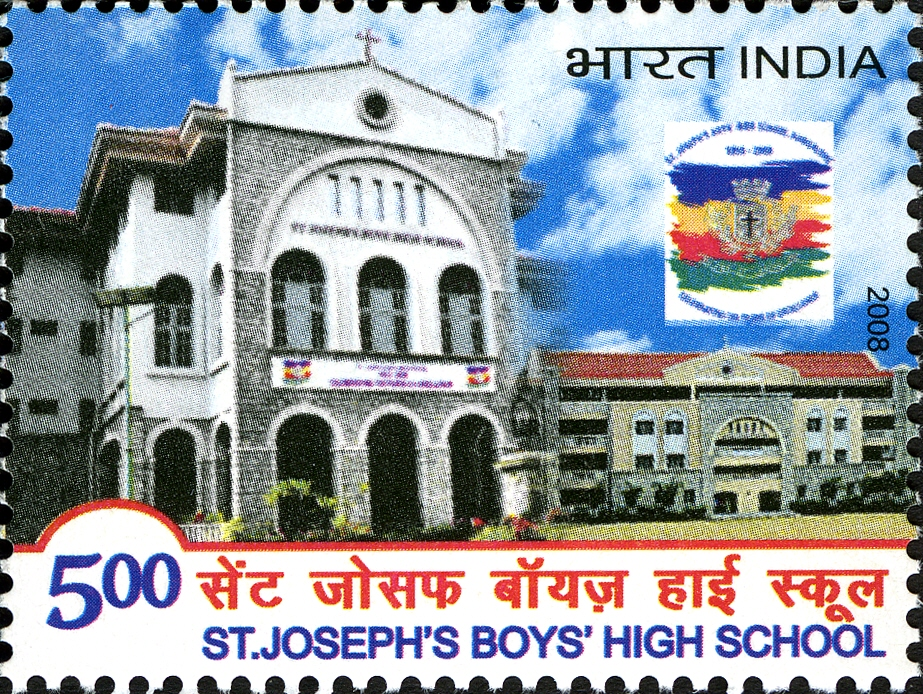
2008 stamp dedicated to St Joseph's Boys' High School

St Joseph's Boys' High School, Bangalore was founded by the MEP French Fathers in 1858 to offer a liberal education for the boys of European/Anglo and Anglo-Indian families. After India's independence, admission was extended in the 1950s and 1960s to include all students, irrespective of race, religion, or caste. The school buildings are situated in the center of the (formerly European quarter of the) city. Originally the upper floors provided dormitory space.

Large, open playgrounds accommodate cricket, football, hockey, and various other sports. The cricket team trains at the Centenary Ground located on Mahatma Gandhi Road near the Mayo Hall. The school pays great attention to physical training and sports and has long conducted the Annual Hockey Tournament for ICSE schools in Bangalore. Sports rivalries have been strong since the mid-19th century.

In 1883, when Father J.M. Vissac was rector, the school was situated on St. John's Hill at the current location of St. Germain High School, adjoining St Francis Xavier's Cathedral. Vissac relocated the school to a large campus in the heart of the City Cantonment. He purchased the "Rocklands" property adjacent to the Madras Bank (the present State Bank of India) and the Good Shepherd Convent and designed the buildings on Museum Road in 1894.

By 1913 the school had grown to 239 boarders and 183-day scholars, and two new blocks were added along with an immense playground called "New Fields" on Vittal Mallya Road. The tract had to be drained for the playing fields. In 1910, the school adopted the High School Examination System giving up the Old Matriculation System and is believed to have at this time adopted the name St Joseph's European High School.

Fr. Vissac had two French priests from the diocese, Frs. Froger and Schmitt, earn their MA from the University of London, England, and they returned to teach. After 20 years Fr. Vissac handed over the reins to Fr. Froger, Rector from 1903 to 1913, and again from 1915 to 1916.

In the first half of the 20th century, the school curriculum was directed toward the Government High and Middle School Examinations, the Cambridge School Certificate, and the Junior and Preliminary Examinations. The school was recognized by Cambridge University and senior candidates could obtain Certificate A of the General Certificate of Education (GCE).

During British rule, teachers in Anglo Indian schools had subsidized salaries that were significantly higher than at the Indian SSLC schools. With Independence in 1947, the school lost many of its earlier privileges.

The Government of India, unwilling to release foreign exchange for these examinations, switched to the Indian School Certificate Council, with two examinations at the end of Classes X and XII, the Indian Certificate of Secondary Education (ICSE) and the Indian School Certificate (ISC).

The school follows the ICSE syllabus up to Class X. In 2005 the school expanded its curriculum at both ends. It added Classes I through IV and extended the high school to include the ISC at Class XII. The year 2007 included another first: Class XI was expanded to include girls.

Another major change over the years was the closing of the in-school boarding house, which had housed boys ages 8 to 16 in three separate dormitories. They were allowed one out-of-school outing on the last Saturday each month. Their health was entrusted to a Medical Officer and matrons in a large infirmary with a special room for infectious diseases.

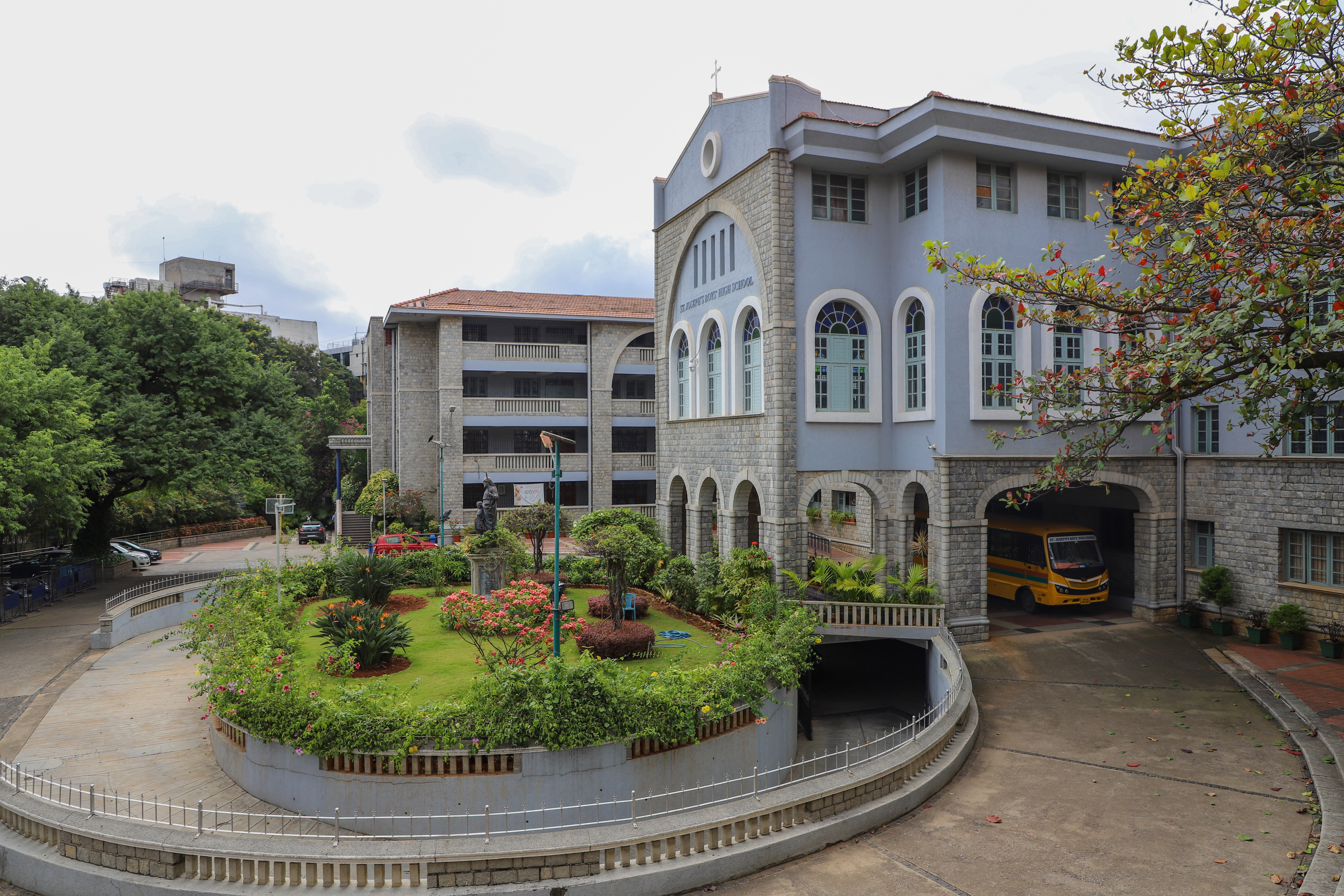
The modern school building's main entrance.

Construction of the new school building took from 2001 until 2007, under Fr. Michael John, the principal from 1994 to 2006. The new facilities, along with improvements, offer a modern and aesthetic environment while retaining from British India the Roman Catholic chapel, the refectory, and the priests' residence.

=== The Society of Jesus connection ===
As early as 1841, Bishop Bonnaud planned to start a Catholic High school in Bangalore. But this proposal took concrete shape only in 1854 when the priests of the Missions étrangères de Paris (MEP) bought a plot of land for a sum of INR 1000 at St. Johns Hill. Bangalore. Fr. Bouteloup had a house constructed in 1854 at a cost of INR 3000 and named it St Joseph's Seminary. It also contained an orphanage and boarding school.

Madras University was established in 1858 and boarders were admitted to prepare for the matriculation examination there. Fr. Charbonnaux, in charge of the school at the time, entered in his diary: "We decided to open a school for European boys. As a knowledge of English is necessary to our Indian pupils and that of Canarese to European boys, we determined to build a wing and a kitchen adjoining the Seminary." This was the beginning of St Joseph's College. In the nomenclature of the day, in European usage a college was what today would be called a high school and what would today be called a college would be termed University. By May 1865, a new house was built to take in the orphans and boarders of the school.

It was difficult for the three departments, seminary, orphanage, and school to function in the same building. Hence in 1875 the orphanage was transferred to St Patrick's Church, where it still exists as St Patrick's Orphanage. The Seminary closed and its buildings were utilized for the school and boarding house. The school had 144 students – 64 boarders and 80-day scholars.

In 1882, the new rector, Fr. Maurice Vissac, had the school affiliated to Madras University as a second-grade college that could prepare and send students for the F.A. (First Arts) exams. In 1884, the first two candidates appeared for this exam and qualified.

During and immediately after World War I, the French Fathers (MEP) found it difficult to staff the school. The devastation of World War I had destroyed nearly a generation of men, some of whom would have become priests and joined the MEP. Bishop Despastures of Mysore, under whose jurisdiction Bangalore came at the time, sought to free up his priests and get religious to teach. He sought unsuccessfully to get the Canons of St Maurice from Switzerland but did get orders of teaching brothers. He had earlier approached the Society of Jesus (Jesuits), founded by St. Ignatius Loyola. He now got the Jesuit Father General in Rome to send a visitor, Fr. Van Kalken, who, in February 1937, wrote to the Superior of the Jesuit Mission in Mangalore that Fr. General had accepted the offer of the bishop of Mysore.

If the Mangalore mission of the Jesuits could not provide sufficient Jesuits, then the Visitor would invite Jesuits from other Indian missions to offer their services for this work. All St Joseph's institutions – St Joseph's European High School, St Joseph's Indian High School situated at the "New Fields" grounds on Vittal Mallya Road, and St Joseph's College – were transferred to Jesuit management.

When Italy aligned itself with Hitler against the British for World War II, Italian and German priests were branded as enemy aliens and were interned. The Jesuit superiors found Fr. E.J. Jacques, an Anglo-Indian with an M.A. degree from the University of London, and Fr. Studerus, a Swiss and hence a neutral, to fill the vacancies. Later, Indian Jesuits came to manage the schools.

== The Houses ==
The House system is a feature common to Public Schools in India, especially Christian-run schools (based on a similar system in England).

The four houses are named after the patron saints of the four constituent nations of the United Kingdom:

- St. Andrew of Scotland – colour blue
- St. Patrick of Northern Ireland – colour green
- St. George of England – colour red
- St. David of Wales – colour yellow

The houses compete with one another in academics, games, track and field sports, aquatics, arts, and literary, dramatic, and music competitions.

== Notable alumni ==
Notable alumni include:

Kumar Anish	yoga practitioner and the developer of the concept of GOPI Formula in yoga
Ashish Ballal	Indian national hockey team
Krishna Bharath	Creator of Google News
Sabeer Bhatia	Co-founder of Hotmail
Sandeep Dikshit	MP from East Delhi constituency
Rahul Dravid	Former captain of the Indian cricket team
Ben Gomes	Google Search
Rajeev Gowda	Spokesperson for the Indian National Congress, professor of economics and social sciences at Indian Institute of Management Bangalore
Mariappa Kempaiah	Olympian Indian footballer – 1956 Melbourne and 1960 Rome Olympics
Tarun Khanna	Jorge Paulo Lemann Professor at the Harvard Business School
T. S. Krishnamurthy	Chief Election Commissioner of India
Sudhir Krishnaswamy	Rhodes Scholar; Vice-Chancellor of National Law School of India University, Bangalore
George Kurian	CEO of NetApp
Thomas Kurian	CEO of Google Cloud
Chetan Maini	Founder of Reva Electric Car Company
Mario Miranda	Cartoonist and Padma Bhushan awardee
Devdutt Padikkal	Cricketer for the Indian under-19s, Royal Challengers Bangalore, and Karnataka teams
J. Y. Pillay	Singaporean bureaucrat and former chairman of Singapore Airlines and Singapore Exchange
Rehan Poncha	Represented India in the 2008 Summer Olympics in Beijing
Prakash Raj	Film artist in Sandalwood, Kollywood, Tollywood, and Bollywood
Subir Sachdev	Professor of physics at Harvard University specializing in condensed matter
Rahul Sarpeshkar	Professor of electrical engineering and computer science at the Massachusetts Institute of Technology
Anup Sridhar	India's former national badminton champion; represented India at 2008 Beijing Olympics
Shavir Tarapore	International ODI and T20 cricket umpire
Robin Uthappa	Indian cricket team
Joseph Murumbi	Second Vice President of the Republic Of Kenya
Irfan Razack	Chairman and Managing Director of Prestige Group
Walter de Sousa	Olympian, Gold Medal winner at Field hockey at the 1948 Summer Olympics

== See also ==
- List of Jesuit schools
- List of schools in Bangalore
- Violence against Christians in India
