= CBSE expression series =

Central Board of Secondary Education expression series is an online/offline essay/poem/drawing competition organised by the Central Board of Secondary Education (CBSE) in India for classes 1 to 12. It was initiated in 2014. A cash prize of Indian Rupees 2500-25,000 is given to each of the 36 winners (12 in each category) In 2014, more than 29,000 students participated. Entries are accepted in any of 22 scheduled languages and in English. The purpose of the contest is to make students aware of the history of women and men who have served the nation of India.

== Topics ==
=== 2014 ===
Topics in 2014
Date	Topic	Picture	References	Remarks
25 December 2014	Good Governance day			More than 29,000 students took part.
26 December 2014	Good Governance day			More than 29,000 students took part.
2014	Young Scientific Minds of India			More than 29,000 students took part.
24 December 2014	Education for Future Development			On the eve of Pandit Madan Mohan Malviya's birthday.

=== 2015 ===
It focused on the contribution of great leaders of India and on several important issues related to women, society (both rural and urban) and the nation.

Leaders on whom topics were base in 2015
Date	Name of leader / Topic	Picture	References	Remarks
10 & 11 July 2015				First in 2015
18 and 19 December 2015	Atal Bihari Vajpayee			The circular was issued by Praggya M. Singh, assistant professor and joint director, CBSE.
15 October 2015	Dr. A. P. J. Abdul Kalam			
2 October 2015	Mohandas Karamchand Gandhi			
11 October 2015	Jayaprakash Narayan			
25, 26 and 27 September 2015	Pandit Deendayal Upadhyaya			Only series which lasted for 3 days
5 and 6 September 2015	Dr. S. Radhakrishnan			
16 December 2015	Madan Mohan Malviya			
3 November 2015	Maulana Kalam Azad			CBSE received 5,758 entries in Hindi, Sanskrit, Marathi, Telugu, Tamil, Malayalam, Oriya, Bengali and Punjabi. Results were announced on 11 November.; Only 30 entries were selected.
31 October 2015	Sardar Patel			
Sept 21–28, 2015	Indo-Africa expression series			Longest (week long ); in collaboration with the India-Africa Forum Summit (IAFS)

== Selection of winners ==
The final winners are selected from three class categories, i.e. classes 1st to 5th, Classes 6th to 8th and classes 9th to 12th. Winning entries are compiled in an E- book.
