= SGPTA =

Sri Parents and Teachers Association

Location
- Netaji Road, T R NAGAR, Bangalore; Bangalore, India, Karnataka; India

Information
- Principal: Mr. Prathap Naidu
- Gender: Co-educational
- Website: SGPTA PU College

Sri Gururaja Parents and Teachers Association (SGPTA) is a co-educational primary and secondary school in Thyagarajanagar in Bangalore, Karnataka, India.

== History ==
The school was started by teachers and parents of another local school near Netakallapa Circle in Basavangudi in response to an increase in the school fees. The school had no building of its own and borrowed the premises of the nearby Acharya Patashala School (APS). The classes were conducted in the morning when the class rooms of APS were free.

After about a year, the school rented a house in Nagasandra Circle, Basavangudi and started a full-time school. The number of pupils grew steadily and in 1978 they had enough numbers to have two classes for the first grade (I standard).

Eventually the school bought a piece of land in Thyagaraja Nagara and constructed the current building.

== Syllabus ==
The syllabus followed is from the Karnataka Education Board. There are about four tests conducted by the school during the year and two exams. The final exam can be either a public exam or a school exam depending the grade/standard.

== Officials ==
- Head mistress: Smt. VijayaLakshmi.
- Principal: Mr. Prathap Naidu.

== Information ==
- Address: S.G.P.T.A. School, Netaji Road, Thyagaraja Nagar, Bangalore, 560028, Karnataka, India.
- Landmark: Near KEB Quarters
