= National Public School, Koramangala =

Location
- Next to National Games Village, 80 Feet Road, Koramangala, Bengaluru, 560047; Bangalore, Karnataka, 560047; India; 12.9492°N 77.6208°E

Information
- Type: Private
- Motto: Reach out, Reach high, Reach beyond
- Established: 2003
- School board: Central Board of Secondary Education
- Principal: Jyotsna Nair
- Grades: Kindergarten, Montessori, 1-12
- Classes offered: Accountancy, Business Studies, Entrepreneurship, Physics, Chemistry, Mathematics, Economics, Biology, English, Hindi, Sanskrit, French, Geography, History, Civics, Psychology,
- Hours in school day: 8
- Houses: Voyagers, Challengers, Explorers, Pioneers
- Colour: brown
- Sports: Basketball, Football, Volleyball, Throwball, Badminton,
- Yearbook: Resonance
- Feeder schools: tisb
- Website: www.npskrm.com

National Public School, Koramangala is a private school located in Koramangala. It was established in 2003 and is a part of the NPS group of schools.

The school is run by the National Education Trust, which is a linguistic, regional, minority institution.

== School dynamics (accurately described) ==
Students are admitted to one of four houses:

- Challengers maroon "To strive, to seek, to find and not to yield".
- Explorers purple "Endeavour to Reach Beyond"
- Pioneers amber "The Light that always shows, the Spark that always glows".
- Voyagers blue "Vigour, Valour, Victory".

Since the academic session of 2022-23, students have self nominated for student council positions, and the selection for most badges have been decided by the teachers from the pool of nominated students. Students of Grades XII or XI are eligible for the posts of School Prefect, Sports Captain and House Captain, and their deputies. The students of Grades IX to XII are elected by teachers to preside over clubs. These clubs include Science, Mathematics, Computers, Literary, Commerce, Performing Arts (Dance), Fine Arts, Music, Quizzing and the MUN club. The student government body comprises close to 60 members and takes office at an official Investiture Ceremony.

== Events ==
=== Aahan ===
Aahan is a 1 day cultural event, held once in every 3 years, since 2006. All the students come together to showcase performances like dances, songs and skits for their parents. These performances are all based on a theme which during the last edition was about ballyotsav, a celebration of childhood. This is an event held on a grand scale which sees involvement from all the students of the school as well as teachers who work behind the scenes.

=== Khoj ===
Khoj is a science festival held over the course of 1 day. It takes place once every 3 years, the first of which was in 2005. The students make various projects in physics, chemistry, biology and computer science that showcase their scientific temper. Seniors are also to host informative and semi-interactive plays. Parents and students from other school are invited to attend the festival.

=== Sports Day ===
Sports day is a triennial event. The four houses compete over the course of the year in various sports events, and on the final day, the finals of the track and field events are held in TISB. Points are awarded for each victory. At the end of the day, the house with the most points is awarded the sports cup. Kaveri won the sports cup in the year 2022–23.

=== Iris ===
It is a science and literary competition that was first conducted in 2018. Events span from treasure hunts and escape rooms to moot court and poetry events.

=== Founder's Cup ===
This is a basketball tournament, held annually since 2016. The tournament allows students from grade 10 to grade 12 to participate. Initially it was only for the NPS group of schools, it was later changed to include other schools. The Tournament takes place over the course of 3 days, with a boys category and a girls category. Referees from the Karnataka Basketball Association preside over the game.

== Initiatives by students ==
=== TAGE ===
Towards A Green Education is a programme started by Aniruddha Voruganti and Nishant Panicker in 2016 that aims to provide stationery and books to the underprivileged. It hosts various drives to collect excess books and stationery from the students. It also hosts paper collection drives and notebook making competitions. The notebooks are made from unused pages of older partially used notebooks. These notebooks are then sent to the underprivileged students.

=== Why Waste? ===
This initiative, created by Garvita Gulhati and Pooja Tanwade, aims to curb food and water waste in restaurants by increasing awareness and introducing a few basic common sense measures. Nearly 130 restaurants in Bengaluru were contacted. As of 2016, over 30 restaurants were cooperating to reduce water wastage in Bengaluru.
