= Innisfree =

Innisfree may refer to:

== Places ==
- Innisfree, Alberta, a village in Canada
- Innisfree Garden, a public garden in Millbrook, New York
- Inishfree, two islands off County Donegal
- Inisfree, a fictional Irish village and setting of the film The Quiet Man
- Inisfree, a small uninhabited island in Lough Gill, Ireland

== Other uses ==
- Innisfree (brand), South Korean cosmetics brand
- Innisfree (film), a 1990 Spanish documentary film
- Innisfree House School, southern Bangalore
- Innisfree Ltd, investment group
- Innisfree Bookshop, Meredith, New Hampshire

== See also ==
- "Isle of Innisfree", a 1950 song originally featured in The Quiet Man
- "Lake Isle of Innisfree", a poem by William Butler Yeats
