= Daffodils English School, Sanjaynagar =

Daffodils English School

Location
- II Stage, Daffodils School Rd; Sanjaynagar; Bengaluru, Karnataka, 560094; India; 13.03468°N 77.57896°E

Information
- School type: English Medium School
- Established: 1978; 48 years ago
- Founder: P.K. Bheemaiah
- Principal: Mrs. Aparna Ramasheshaiah
- Language: English
- Website: http://daffodils.school

Daffodils English School is a co-educational English Medium School located in Sanjaynagar, Bangalore. The school was founded in 1978 by P.K. Bheemaiah.

== Sites and Buildings ==
There are two main buildings, the main or old building and the new building. The main building is the original building of this school, and has 4 floors excluding the ground floor. The 4th floor was built along with the new building and consists of auditoriums and exam halls. The main building is rectangular in shape, along the perimeter of an open courtyard. The open courtyard contains a grass lawn with a water fountain in the middle and bushes lining the sides.

Right next to the main building is the new building, which was built very recently to accommodate students of the CBSE syllabus. This building is built similarly to the old building, but has a badminton court instead of an open courtyard. It has 5 floors excluding the ground floor, with only the ground and the first 4 floors being actively used.

There is a huge open ground attached to the main building where sports and physical education take place. The school has a basketball court in the new building and additional basketball hoops in the open ground. A dedicated sports room contains a large number of sports equipment like footballs, basketballs, badminton racquets, etc.

== Education ==
The school has classes from nursery school level to high school. The medium of instruction is English.

The school hosts an annual English debate competition, the Shri P.K. Bheemaiah Memorial Interschool English Debate Competition.

In 2015, Indian daily paper The Hindu reported that the school obtained a 100% pass rate in the Secondary School Leaving Certificate.

Daffodils English Schools is affiliated to the Karnataka Secondary Education Examination Board and the Council for the Indian School Certificate Examinations.
