= New BEL Road =

New BEL Road is a commercial and residential street in north Bangalore, Karnataka, India. The street is three kilometers long and houses a number of fine dining restaurants, pubs, retail outlets, gyms and salons.

New BEL Road is in close proximity to Ramaiah Institute of Technology from whose Main Gate (Gate #1) it even begins, as well as Indian Institute of Science and Sankey tank.
