= Cluny Convent High School, Jalahalli =

School in Bangalore, India

Coordinates: 13°3′18.4″N 77°32′26.0″E

Information
- Established: 1956; 70 years ago
- Founders: Sisters of St. Joseph of Cluny
- Website: www.clunyjalahalli.com/index.php

The Cluny Convent High School is in Jalahalli, Bangalore, India. It was founded by the Sisters of St. Joseph of Cluny in 1956.

== Cluny in Jalahalli ==
The sisters of St Joseph's of Cluny started their educational institution in Bangalore at Malleshwaram in 1948. In 1956 there was a need to start a school for the children of the employees of Bharat Electronics Limited & Hindustan Machine Tools factories. The sisters travelled from Malleshwaram to Jalahalli by whatever transport available (very often they walked). Soon there was a need to build a convent closer to school and so started their convent next to the church.

Classes began in a small building that was made available by HMT, later the classes moved to a spacious building at BEL in 1957. It started as a primary school admitting both boys and girls. Boys' schooling was up to 3rd std. and the girls were up to 4th std. Since quality education was their aim the reputation of the school grew attracting more students and the management was compelled to build their own school in 1973. This was built next to the parish church attached to the convent. Starting with the I.C.S.E syllabus it was soon replaced by the S.S.L.C Syllabus. Boys' schooling was allowed till 7th standard, but changed again. At present, Boys' schooling is up to 4th standard. From a primary school it grew up to be a complete high school and now also has a pre-university college for girls.
