= Board solid-state drive =

Board SSD (Alternative form)

The board solid-state drive, commonly referred to as the BSSD, is an implementation of a regular SSD, but in a different form factor and packaging, which is perhaps optimized for certain aspects of the storage device, such as cost or density.

The term board in BSSD refers to the printed circuit board (PCB), from references to on-board SSDs.

While a regular SSD also contains a PCB, the packaging of the SSD physically encloses the PCB inside it, making it more easy to handle the storage device, since the packing protects the PCB from the damaging effects electro static discharge.

BSSDs, however, keep the PCB exposed (thereby reducing cost, increasing density, etc.), but however requiring special care in handling it, by use of devices such as, the antistatic wrist strap. While such care in handling is not any different from that required when replacing the graphics adapter in a computer slot, it does restrict the uses of BSSDs to data center uses and makes it unsuitable for consumer applications.

== Hardware Interconnect ==
Multiple BSSDs are housed in a disk enclosure that connect to the storage server via SAS or some other interconnect.

== Software Interface ==
The BSSD comes under the umbrella of block data storage, as does the regular SSD and uses logical block addressing.
