= Garvita Gulhati =

Indian social entrepreneur and engineer

Garvita Gulhati (born 1999/2000) is an Indian social entrepreneur, engineer, and the founder of the organization Why Waste?. She currently works as an investment analyst at WestBridge Capital. Gulhati was recognized by Forbes 30 Under 30 Asia 2021 for her work on water conservation. Gulhati is known as the "water girl of India."

== Humanitarian work ==
At the age of 15, Gulhati learned that nearly 14 million liters of water was being wasted, specifically at restaurants. At the same time there were millions of homes lacking access to water. Gulhati began her initiative, Why Waste?, to combat this problem.

Why Waste? was launched in 2015, and the first project was coined #GlassHalfFull. Gulhati and other volunteers shared stories of those who did not have access to water. They visited restaurants and spoke on the importance of water conservation.

The initiative received support from the National Restaurant Association of India in 2019. Why Waste? is now an international youth-led organization. According to Gulhati in 2021, its work had impacted over 10 million individuals and over 500,000 restaurants and led to the conservation of nearly 6 million liters of water. Why Waste? has built partnerships with several organizations, including Facebook, Google, and the Ikea Foundation.

In 2021, Gulhati launched the Why Waste? app to help users manage their water usage and footprint. In partnership with CNN, the app is creating a movement to motivate people to take action through the campaign, "Mission Paani" (Mission Water).

Gulhati, alongside her team, published the book Sustainability Stories to inspire youth to take action. Sustainability Stories was published in collaboration with India's largest non-profit publisher, Pratham, and in collaboration with UNICEF.

Gulhati is also engaged with We the Change, a United Nations climate campaign in India.

Gulhati has also worked on establishing the Lead Young at Schools movement, involving over 800 schools and inspiring more than 2.5 million students in India to take action.

== Education ==
Gulhati graduated in 2021 with a degree in Electronics and Communications Engineering from PES University in Bengaluru. She is a Wharton Moelis Fellow.

== Career ==
After two years of experience in FinTech, Gulhati joined Westbridge Capital in Bengaluru as an Investment Analyst.

== Personal life ==
Gulhati enjoys painting and playing badminton in her spare time. She is trained in kathak, a classical Indian dance genre.

== Awards and recognition ==
Gulhati was the youngest to be recognized by Forbes 30 Under 30 Asia 2021 for her work with Why Waste?. She was also the recipient of the Diana Award for her humanitarian work. Gulhati was recognized by the Project Management Institute as part of Future 50, a cohort of leaders innovating for the future. She has been honored as a Global Ashoka Young Changemaker by Ashoka Innovators. Gulhati is the only Indian to be endowed with Shawn Mendes Foundation's Wonder Grant.

== See also ==
- Water scarcity in India
