= R. T. Nagar =

R. T. Nagar Rabindranath Tagore Nagar
- Area
- Country: India
- State: Karnataka
- District: Bangalore Urban
- Named for: Rabindranath Tagore
- Time zone: UTC+5:30 (IST)
- PIN: 560032
- Telephone code: +91-80

Rabindranath Tagore Nagar or simply R. T. Nagar is an area in northern Bangalore, India. It is named after Rabindranath Tagore. It is part of the Bangalore North Lok Sabha Constituency and the Hebbal Assembly Constituency. R.T Nagar has two blocks, Block I and Block II.

== Notable natives and residents ==
- S. R. Bommai – Chief Minister, Karnataka, August 1988 – April 1989
- Late R. Gundu Rao – Chief Minister, Karnataka, 1980 to 1983. His son Dinesh Gundu Rao is a sitting MLA
- Late Dharam Singh – Chief Minister, Karnataka, 2003 to 2006.
- Veerappa Moily – Chief Minister, Karnataka, 1992–1994, former union law and petroleum and natural gas department minister
- D.B. Chandre Gowda – Member of Parliament, Bangalore North Constituency
