= Charan's Public School, Ulsoor, Bengaluru =

Charan's Public School

Location
- 326, 1st Main Rd, Someshvarapura Layout, Jogupalya, Bangalore, Karnataka 560007, India; Bangalore, Karnataka; India

Information
- Type: Private School
- Principal: Charubala Ranganathan
- Affiliation: Secondary School Leaving Certificate Examination (SSLC)
- Information: +91 80 2557 6440
- Website: http://charanspublicschool.org/

Charan's Public School is a co-educational school in Ulsoor, Bangalore, Karnataka, India. It was founded in 1990. It offers Karnataka State Board Syllabus with languages, Kannada, Sanskrit, English as an optional language.

Charan's Public School received an award from the government of Karnataka for scoring 100% in SSLC 2013. The school has successfully secured many prizes and awards in sports, Olympiad, singing, and dance competitions.

Charan's Public School is a part of Charans Institutions which is a group of schools under the same school name. Another prominent school part of Charans Institutions is Charan's PU College, Ulsoor, Bangalore.

== Houses ==
The house system is a feature common to public schools in India. The four houses of the Charan's Public School are:

- Champions
- Challengers
- Conquerors
- Contenders

The houses compete against each other in academics, games, track and field sports, aquatics, arts, literary, and drama and music competitions and the best team gets an award. This event happens every year, mostly during the Summer Months.

== Exams and Tests ==
There are tests and exams that happen year-round. The year begins with Unit tests and ends with Term exams. Unit test include whatever has been taught during the months before it and Term exams include everything that has been taught in the year. The year ends with The "Final Term Exam".

=== Subjects taught here ===
1. English (1st language)
2. Kanada (2nd Language)
3. Hindi (3rd Language)
4. Maths
5. Science
6. Social
7. Life Lessons
8. General Knowledge
9. Olympiad Practice
10. And Physical Education
