= Janaseva Vidyakendra Boys Residential School =

Janaseva Vidyakendra

Location
- Magadi Road, Channenahalli 562 130; Bengaluru, Karnataka; India; 12.9774°N 77.4324°E

Information
- Type: Private school
- Motto: Tejaswi Navadhitamastu
- Established: 1972
- Founder: Janaseva trust
- School board: Karnataka secondary school Examination Board (KSSEB)
- Headmaster: Shri Mahantesh H G
- Enrollment: 600
- Language: For High school both Kannada Medium and English Medium
- Sports: Hockey, Basketball, Kabaddi, kho-Kho, Shuttle Badminton, Table tennis, Volleyball, Football, Athletics
- Publication: Annual book "Vidyashree"
- Information: 9241216119, +91-080-64548640
- Website: http://www.janasevatrust.in/

Hostel

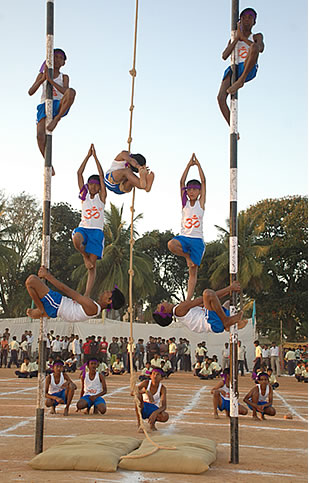
Annual day celebration

Janaseva Vidya Kendra (JSVK), commonly known as Janaseva Vidya Kendra Boys Hostel, is located on Magadi Road, Channenahalli, in Bangalore in the Indian state of Karnataka. It is a boys' hostel school. The school was built by educationists from Karnataka and began with 13 boys in 1972, growing to around 600 students ranging from 5th to 12th grade. The school celebrated its 25th year in 2000. The campus spans over 60 acres and is managed by the Janaseva Trust.

The School celebrates its Annual Day in December month every year.

The institution has started to construct a new building on campus. Bhoomi Pooja was performed on 30 April 2015. The chief guest was Sarasanghachalak Dr. Mohan Bhagavath. The work has been completed by 2020.

== History and institutional background ==
The school began operations in 1972 under the management of the Janaseva Trust, initially educating a small group of 13 boys before expanding its facilities to handle hundreds of regional students. The academic curriculum is structured around traditional Indian culture, Sanskrit language study, and agricultural training alongside the formal state board parameters.

=== Ideological links and expansion ===
The institution maintains close cultural and ideological links to the Rashtriya Swayamsevak Sangh (RSS). On 30 April 2015, RSS Sarsanghachalak Dr. Mohan Bhagwat performed the Bhoomi Pooja (foundation stone laying ceremony) for a major infrastructural expansion of the school buildings, an event heavily covered during regional RSS conventions hosted on the campus grounds. The upgraded hostel dormitories and campus expansion project were fully completed by 2020.

== Management and facilities ==
JSVK is run by the Janaseva Trust. Most of the members are professors and educationist in Karnataka. The school covers over 60 acres. Facilities include an emergency medical care unit and barber shop. Sports facilities include courts for football, badminton, basketball, field hockey, volleyball, Kho kho and Kabaddi

All students live in dormitories and are supervised by house masters. Most daily activities are run by students under the supervision of house master or supervisors. The main house master or Pradhana Nilaya Palaka is Raju master.

The staff consists of:

- Nirmal Kumar - Honorary General Secretary Janaseva Trust
- Mahantesh.H.G - Principal

== Socio-political significance and controversies ==
The institution's parent body, the Janaseva Trust, became the subject of national and state-level media coverage in 2023 due to a political dispute over land allocations. The previous BJP-led Karnataka government had granted 35.33 acres of government grazing land (gomala) in Kurubarahalli, Tavarekere to the trust for educational expansion.

Following a change in the state administration, the incoming Congress-led government put the land grant on hold, citing potential statutory rule violations, drawing strong protests from opposition leaders who cited political targeting.

== Notable alumni ==
- B. Y. Vijayendra – President of the Karnataka State unit of the Bharatiya Janata Party (BJP) and Member of the Legislative Assembly (MLA), who completed his high school education at the institution from classes 8 to 10.
