= Poorna Learning Centre, Sahakarnagar =

Poorna Learning Centre, Satnur is a small alternative school in Sahakar Nagar, Bangalore in the state of Karnataka, India. It started as an effort in home schooling the children of the founder. Saira Banu is the current principal of the school. The school is very inclusive and open and teacher-student relations are very relaxed, where students call the teachers by their first names.

About 140 children, 32 teachers (including special education teachers), and four support staff make up the Poorna community. As some children may have learning disabilities, Poorna has always been involving and employing special education teachers as and when the need arises. Poorna also strives to support children from all economic backgrounds.

Poorna does not follow any particular syllabus, rather, the syllabus is developed taking into consideration the ages, abilities and interests of the children in each group. Overall learning goals are planned for each group of children, however, there is room for working outside of these when children are interested to do so.

At the age of fifteen or whenever they are ready for it, students are helped to take the National Open School (NOS) Secondary Level Examination. This examination is conducted directly by the Ministry of Human Resources and Development, New Delhi. Students may sit the exam at the Bangalore centre after registering for the NOS. Thus, in order to appear for the NOS exam, NOS requirements for syllabi are followed in standards 9 and 10. Students may also take the IGCSE exam in their tenth instead of NOS and sit for the exam in school.

The National Open School (NOS) exam is recognised as equivalent to the 10th standard examination by the various State Boards of Education, and also by the IITs and other such institutions. After passing the examination students have the following options for further studies:

- Joining a local college for PUC or other Indian boards such as CBSE or ISC
- Taking the NOS Senior Secondary Examination (equivalent to 12th standard)
- Taking the British A-level examination privately or pursuing an IB diploma in case they wish to pursue studies abroad.
