= Sanjaynagar =

Coordinates: 13°2′13.82″N 77°34′55.41″E

Sanjaynagar Sanjaynagara
- Neighbourhood
- Rajamahal Vilas 2nd Stage
- Nickname: Dollars Colony
- Location in Bangalore, India
- Country: India
- State: Karnataka
- District: Bangalore Urban

Government
  - Body: Bruhat Bengaluru Mahanagara Palike
- Time zone: UTC+5:30 (IST)
- PIN: 560094
- Telephone code: +91-80
- Vehicle registration: KA04

Sanjaynagar is a residential area located in northern Bangalore, India. Established in the late 1970s, it is now a busy and sprawling locality in Bangalore. Located to the left side of NH 7, which leads to Kempegowda International Airport, Sanjaynagar comprises many colonies, established by the employees associations of N.G.E.F., HAL, CIL, Postal Colony and Siddhi Vinayaka Layout. Due to other prominent areas like R. T. Nagar and Sadashivanagar surrounding this area, it led to its rapid development. The presence of Ramaiah Institute of Technology hastened the development of Sanjaynagar's New BEL Road.

It is now a busy and sprawling locality in Bangalore. Located to the left side of NH 7, which leads to Kempegowda International Airport, Sanjaynagar comprises many colonies, established by the employees associations of N.G.E.F., HAL, CIL, Postal Colony and Siddhi Vinayaka Layout. Due to other prominent areas like R. T. Nagar and Sadashivanagar surrounding this area, it led to its rapid development. The presence of Ramaiah Institute of Technology hastened the development of Sanjaynagar's New BEL Road.

== Landmarks ==
Vaibhav Theatre is one of the landmarks of the area.
