= Mahila Seva Samaja =

Educational Institution in Bangalore

Mahila Seva Samaja is an educational institution in Bangalore, Karnataka, established by Parvatiamma Chandrashekar Iyer. The name Mahila Seva Samaja translates as "Women's Service Society". It was founded for the upliftment of women and exclusively for the education of women, in 1913. It was officially named as Mahila Seva Samaja in 1915. The management council consisted of only women. It had very humble beginnings. Then in 1916, the then King of Mysore granted the society, about two acres of land to build a school. Since then it has grown into a sought-after institution for educating both boys and girls for elementary as well as high-school grades. Mahatma Gandhi visited the school in 1927. The members of the committee that runs the school still is exclusively a team of women. In 2015 the school building received the INTACH Heritage Award.
