= St. Germain High School =

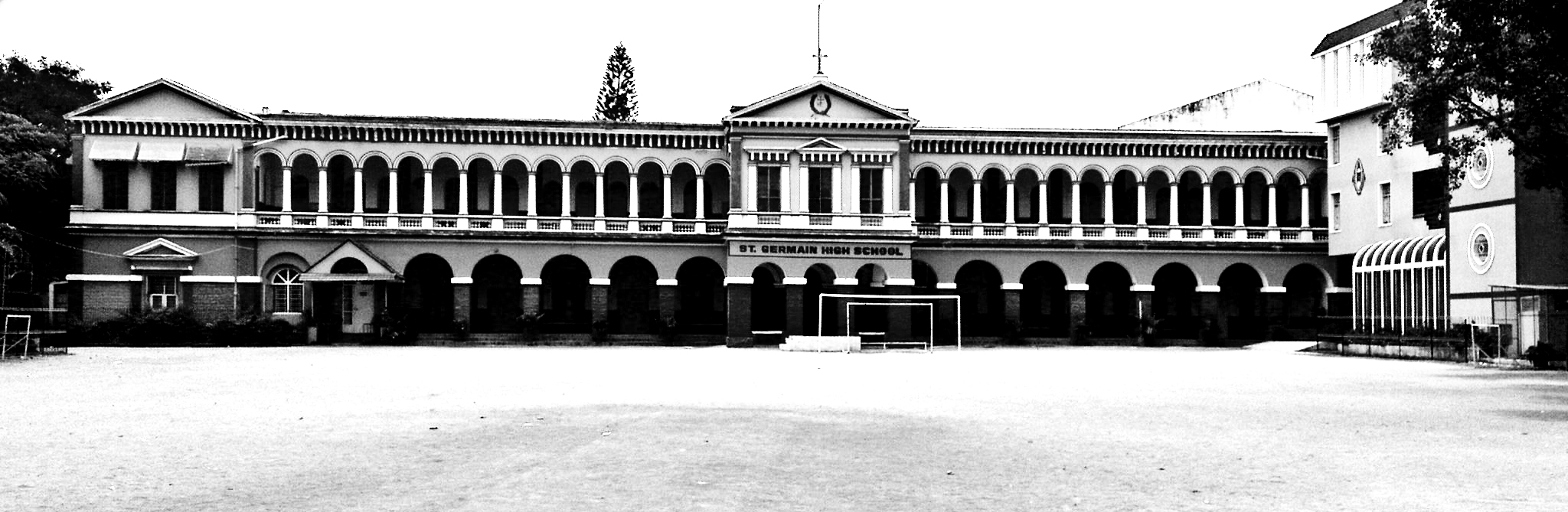
- St. Germain High School

Location
- Promenade Rd, St. John's Hill, Cleveland Town, Fraser Town; Bangalore, Karnataka, 560005; India
- Coordinates: 12°59′36.85″N 77°36′37.73″E

Information
- Type: Public
- Motto: Ad Augusta, Per Angusta (Triumph Through Trials)
- Religious affiliation: Catholic
- Established: c. January 1944
- School board: ICSE
- Principal: Monica Anthony
- Head of school: Rev. Dr. Fr Rayappa. M, Director
- Grades: Std I - X PUC 1-2 LKG UKG
- Gender: Male/female
- Enrollment: 2000
- Houses: Aranjo, Froger, Thomas, Vissac

St. Germain High School is an unaided private institution in Bangalore, India, established in January 1944. The school began in the former Clergy and Archbishop's House, which had housed St. Joseph's Boys' High School before it moved to its present location in Richmond Town. The school was named after a French priest, Rev. Fr. Saint Germain.

The school is managed by the Archdiocesan Board of Education, under the chairmanship of the Archbishop of Bangalore. The school is recognized by the Council for Indian School Certificate Examinations (ICSE) Delhi.

== History ==
The school was founded in January 1944 by the then archbishop of Bangalore, Rt. Rev. Thomas Pothacamury D.D., in memory of Rev. Fr. Saint Germain, a beloved French priest, who until his retirement worked as a teacher and procurator at the local St. Joseph's School and College. These were housed in the present school building (main) until they were moved to their current location at Museum Road in Richmond Town.

The school is situated on top of St. John's Hill with Coles Park on one side and St. Francis Xavier's Cathedral on the other. The main entrance to the school used to be on St. John's Church Road and provided direct entry to the playground. The gate was closed and the main entrance re-located in 1976 to Promenade Road so that the playground could provide unfettered access for play and recreation.

== School motto ==
St. Germain High School had a Latin motto, Ad Augusta, Per Angusta. During the tenure of Rev. Fr, Mervyn Coelho, the English translation was employed, Triumph Through Trials .

== Management ==
The school is managed by the Archdiocesan Board of Education. It is the only Anglo-Indian school maintained by the board.

The school is affiliated to the Council for the Indian School Certificate Examination, New Delhi. Until 1961 the students were prepared for the Bangalore European Secondary School Examination (Std XI) and the Cambridge Overseas Examination. From 1962 to 1969, the state government conducted the Anglo-Indian secondary School Certificate (A.I.S.S.C.) Examination (Std XI). With the change over to the present 10+2+3 Course of States, the I.C.S.E. (Std X) is conducted at the end of Std X. From 1977 to 1990 the school also presented students to the local Std X (SSLC) Examination.

The school always has over 90% passes in the Public Exam, with 100% passes in many years, with the first rank occasionally.

Extra-curricular activities include sports and games, NCC and Scouts, debating and the school band.

The school has represented Karnataka in the Nehru Hockey Tournament held at New Delhi, and has won the B.T. Ramaiah Shield in cricket. The NCC Officer Fazal Bari Khan has been honoured at the state and national levels.

The school's scoutmaster, S.J.P. Keerty, and Cub Master, I. Raj, have won awards for producing President's Scouts.

The late. P.S. Maithily taught mathematics, pure science and computer studies. She headed and administrated the computer club for high school students in 1990s, before Bangalore or India was known for its potential in information technology. Her students have won many awards in mathematics, science and computer studies and are pioneers in these subjects.

== Principals ==
- Rev. Fr. Cyril Browne - Jan 1944 – March 1944
- Rev. Fr. P. Jacquemart - 1944–1945
- Rev. Msgr. Pat Aranjo - 1945–1954
- Rev. Msgr. Stan Aranjo - 1954–1968
- Rev. Fr. Benito DeSouza - 1968–1975
- Rev. Fr. Mervyn Coelho - 1975–1983
- Rev. Fr. Hilary Pereira SJ - 1983–1990
- Rev. Fr. Henry Menezes - 1990–1998
- Rev. Fr. Jerome Rego - Jul 1998–May 1999
- Mr. Francis Ivo D'Souza - 1999–2001
- Rev. Fr. John Rose - 2001–2005
- Rev. Fr. Jerome Rego - 2005–2011 June
- Msgr. S. Jayanathan - 2011–2018 June
- Rev. Dr. Fr. Christopher Vimalraj - 2018–2024
- Fr. Rayappa - 2024–present

== Houses ==
The house system is a feature common to public schools in India, especially Christian-run schools (based on an equivalent system in England). The four houses are named after principals and priests who were closely connected to St. Germains Boys High School.

- Aranjo - Green, after Rev. Msgr. Pat Aranjo (1945–1954) and Rev. Msgr. Stan Aranjo (1954–1968)
- Froger - Blue, after a pious French priest
- Thomas - Red, after the former archbishop of Bangalore, Rt. Rev. Thomas Pothacamury
- Vissac - Yellow, after J.M. Vissac, who, in 1883, was the rector of the Jesuits of Bangalore, who situated the school on St. John's Hill

The houses compete with one another in dramatics, culturals, sports such as athletics competitions (track and field), cricket, basketball, hockey, football and literary events.

== Location ==
The school is situated on the crest of St. John's Hill on Promenade Road in perhaps the most open and healthy part of the garden city of Bangalore. It is flanked on the right by Cathedral Church of St. Francis Xavier and on the left by Coles Park.

The classrooms are housed in a three storied building with broad corridors on both sides. The new building, through very different in architecture, is equally extensive. The school has a garden and playground.

== Notable alumni ==
- Roger Binny, former India cricket allrounder, part of the 1983 Cricket World Cup winning team, currently president of Board of Control for Cricket in India
- Feroz Khan, Bollywood film actor, film editor, producer and director
- Sanjay Khan, Bollywood film and television actor, producer and director
- Syed Mujtaba Hussain Kirmani, former wicketkeeper of India who was part of the 1983 Cricket World Cup winning team
- Jude Felix Sebastian, field hockey player who represented India from 1983 to 1995
