= Innisfree House School =

Location
- J P Nagar, Bangalore; India; 12°54′39.47″N 77°35′14.05″E

Information
- Type: Day school
- Motto: Integrity, Honesty and Sincerity
- Established: 1985
- Principal: Arti Dinesh
- Staff: 52 staff members
- Enrollment: 750
- Website: https://ihs.edu.in

Innisfree House School in Bangalore, India, was started in 1985 to prepare students for the Indian Certificate of Secondary Education. It was one of the first ICSE schools to be established in South Bangalore. The school is managed by the Bolar Education Trust. The motto of the school is 'Integrity, Honesty and Sincerity'.

In 2012, Innisfree also introduced International General Certificate of Secondary Education, for students from grade 6 and above, until Grade 10.

== Introduction ==
The school was started in 1985 in a rented premises with 18 children with classes Nursery to III. This was made possible by the support of Mr. B. Ratnakar, the then chairman of Canara Bank who made sure that the loan was sanctioned for starting the school. In 1986 the No Objection Certificate was obtained from the Government of Karnataka and the strength of the school grew to 30. In 1987, the school was granted Provisional Affiliation by the Council for the Indian School Certificate Examinations. Then began the search for a piece of land. After a lot of wrangling and struggle the present civic amenity site was allotted to the school.

A junior lab catering to children from Preparatory to Class 4 has a system:student ratio of 1:2, and a senior lab catering to children from classes 5 - 12 has a system:student ratio of 1:1.

The school has a pre-school section with an activity room with Montessori equipment and an aviary. There is a rain water harvesting system in place. The children are participants in the programmes conducted by the Kids for Tigers, the Energy and Resources Institute (TERI) and Clean Bangalore. There is also a recycling machine.

To sensitize children about social diversities, the school has adopted a slum school close by. The children interact with the underprivileged children by presenting skits and sharing sweets during festivals. The school provides the slum children with two sets of uniform per child, stationery and books. The school has also arranged for the midday feeding by the ISKCON centre under the Akshaya Patra programme.

Children with learning difficulties work with a special educator, gifted children are put on fast track so that their mental abilities are catered .

== Staff ==
The school has a supervisor at each of the pre-school, middle –school and high school levels. The supervisors are available to deal with any concerns parents may have regarding both academic and non-academic progress of their wards.

It is one of the first schools to provide paternity leave to its staff.

== Founder principal ==
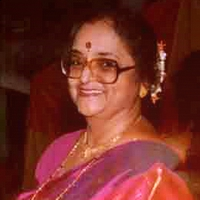
Mrs. S. Bolar

S. Bolar did her schooling at Nirmala Convent, Mysore. Having passed SSLC at the age of 12, she did two years of nursing and compounding at St. Mary's before joining Mount Carmel College, Bangalore for her Pre-University and degree education. She was awarded a Government of India merit scholarship. After four years in the NCC, she graduated as senior Under Officer with a Gliding and Private Pilots licence. She was awarded a scholarship for a Commercial Pilot's license but was unable to take up the offer. Apart from being a keen dramatist, she played table tennis for the college and basketball for the university.

After graduating at the age of 18, she helped set up the library at Teresian College, Mysore. She learnt to play the Sitar and won prizes in the State Rifle Shooting competitions.

She passed the B.Ed, examination of the Regional College of Education, Mysore with distinction. She secured the first rank for M.Ed. at the Post Graduate Department of Education, Manasa Gangothri, Mysore.

On marrying Dr. Ashok Bolar she went to England where she worked in various departments of the British Telecommunication Service as Executive Officer. Later, she taught pupils for the entrance examination of the King Edwards Schools.

On return to India she worked as the Head of the Nursery and Primary sections of a school in Bangalore, before starting Innisfree House School in 1985.

Mrs. Bolar has authored a series of five books for teaching Kannada as third language in ICSE schools. She has also written work-books in English for classes 1 and 2 and a work-book for Std. VI Science based on the Karnataka State Syllabus.

She has been the Secretary-Treasurer of the All India Association of Heads of ISC Schools for 3 years. She is the founder-secretary of the ASISC(K) and a member of the Council for the Indian School Certificate Examinations, New Delhi for the past 12 years.

She is the Indian Resident Trustee of Health, Education, Literacy and Population Services, UK and the Indian co-ordinator for entry into Brighton College, UK, for classes 4 to 12. She is also co-ordinating with two UK Universities for starting a Teachers Training Programme in partnership with the Council.

On behalf of the Council she has coordinated with Mysore University to start a B.Ed. programme for teachers of ICSE schools. It is to be an in-service programme.

Mrs. Bolar has been nominated as a Member of the Board of Studies in Education (Post Graduation), University of Mysore.

== Admission ==
Admission is open irrespective of caste and religion. Konkani speakers are given first preference.

For Std I and above, a transfer certificate from the school in which the child studied previously must be produced in addition to the birth certificate. Records of past progress and good conduct are required from pupils for admission to higher classes. Hindi, Kannada and Sanskrit are offered as second languages for Standard VIII and above.

== Facilities ==
The school has seven laboratories where students can explore the concepts they learn in class - a physics lab, chemistry lab, biology and home science lab, junior computer lab, senior computer lab, language lab and a mindspark lab. It also has an audio-visual room equipped with an LCD projector, an OHP, a slide projector, a TV set and a VCR.

The school library has about 6000 books, 25 kinds of magazines and journals which provides reading and reference material. Pre-schoolers enjoy story telling sessions.

In the evening, students receive coaching from professional coaches in basketball, volleyball, cricket and athletics.

Vans and autorickshaws have been organized by the parents for the children's transportation. The school has even organised a bus service for transportation

== Activities ==
- Different clubs for high schoolers, such as E-games, fitness, culinary and performing arts.(not available at the moment)
- Music
- Eco club for the students of class 7

It was the first school in Bangalore to start recycling, in 2006. It also performs a number of activities like composting, e-waste collection etc.

- Computer studies
- Debates, quiz, elocution and art
- Cricket, volleyball and basketball coaching
- Rotary Interact for High School
- Life Skills

It is also part of the LodeStar Career Counselling Programme- to help 10th standard students make an informed choice of their future studies. It hosts an annual inter-school literary event called the Vistas, for children of classes 4-7 in July.

== In the news ==
In March 2016, the school was closed for a few days after a feared outbreak of foot and mouth disease.
