= Thyagarajanagar =

- neighbourhood
- Location within Bengaluru
- Coordinates: 12.9320692°N 77.5676851°E
- Country: India
- State: Karnataka
- Metro: Bengaluru

Languages
  - Official: Kannada, English
- Time zone: UTC+5:30 (IST)
- PIN: 560028

Thyagarajanagar is one of the oldest localities in Bengaluru and is approximately 500 years old area in Bangalore. It is part of Basavanagudi in South Bengaluru. The area has several religious temples.

In 2013, the area PIN code was changed from 560028 to 560070 as Thyagarajanagar post office was merged with Banashankari II Stage PO.

== Transport ==
The area is well connected by Bengaluru Metropolitan Transport Corporation. Metro available at jayanagar metro station . 20 mins walk from Thyagarajanagar. BMTC: From majestic 210P,210N, 31E,210KA,210NH
