= National Public School, Indiranagar =

- School Logo

Location
- Bengaluru, Karnataka; India; 12°58′10.5″N 77°38′48.4″E

Information
- Type: Private school
- Motto: Reach Out, Reach High, Reach Beyond!
- Established: 1982; 44 years ago
- Enrollment: 1765
- Houses: Challengers Explorers Pioneers Voyagers
- Colors: Khaki and white
- Publication: Glimpses, Newsdesk
- Website: http://www.npsinr.com/

The National Public School, Indiranagar (NPS) is a private school located in Indiranagar, Bengaluru, India. It was started in 1982 by Dr. Gopalkrishna, chairman of the National education trust.

== About ==
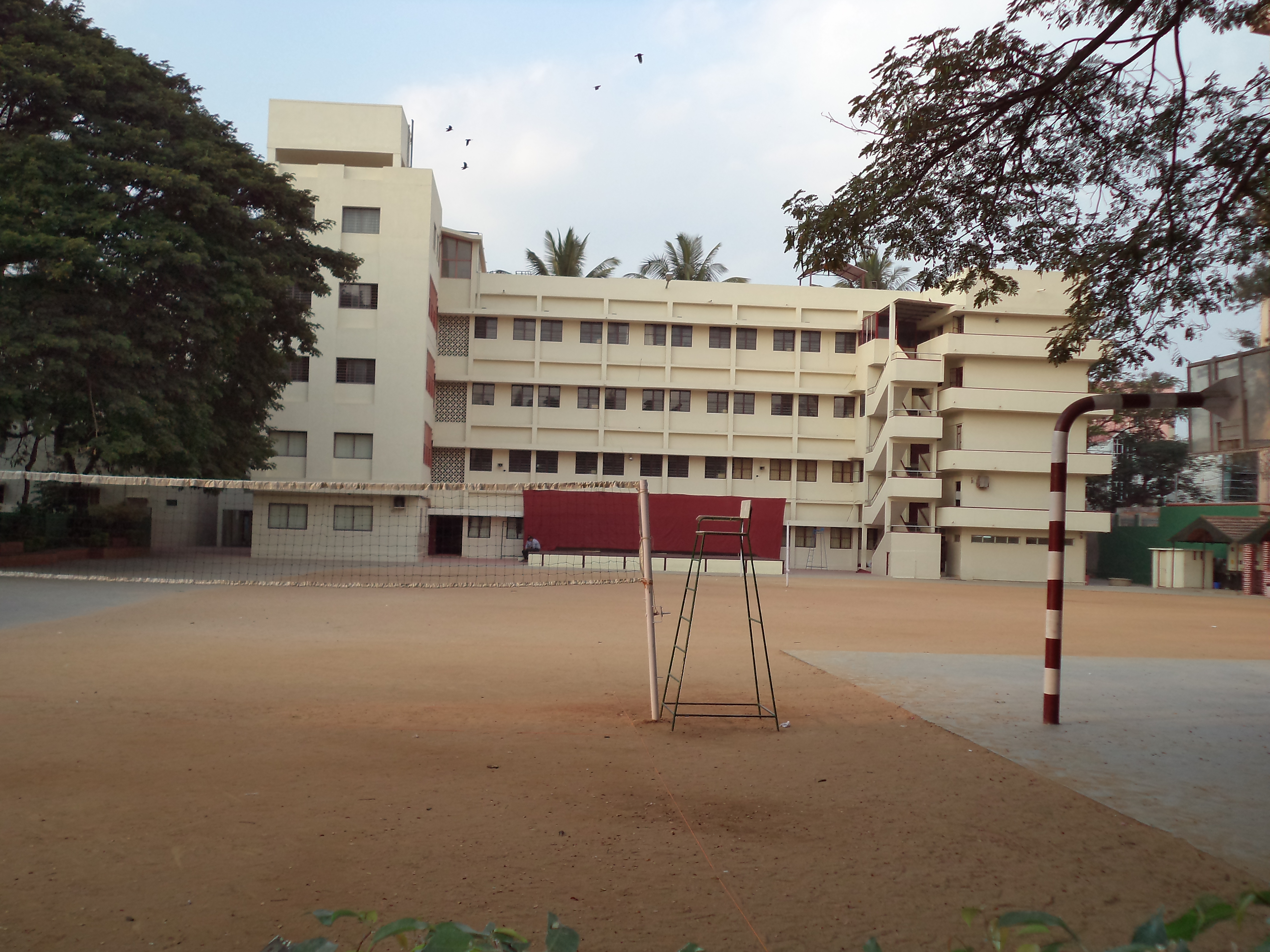
National Public School Indiranagar - Main Building

The school is an English medium co-educational school which was affiliated to the Central Board of Secondary Education (CBSE) till 2016, when their affiliation was cancelled.

== Achievements ==
In 2012, the school was ranked 8th in India and 2nd in Bangalore.

== Notable alumni ==
- Sandeepa Dhar, Bollywood actress and model
- Megha, playback singer and neurolinguist
