= Mysore Education Society Kishora Kendra School =

Coordinates: 13.0047°N 77.5642°E

- Bangalore, Karnataka; India

Information
- Established: 1979; 47 years ago
- Staff: 120
- Enrollment: c.2700

MES Kishora Kendra is a school and college located in the city of Bangalore in the state of Karnataka, India. The school was founded in 1979. It has Pre-primary, Primary and High school sections and the Junior college, recognized by the government of Karnataka.

== History ==
The school was started in 1979 by the Mysore Education Society It offered only primary education initially. In 1993, a Pre-University college was added to the institution.

In the course of two decades, the school has grown from a student strength of 17 to 2700 students and has a staff of 120 members.

== Buildings ==
In the serene ambience of the cool Malleshwaram area of Bangalore, 'Brahmi' - as the school building is named, has a quadrangle with a stage. Construction started in 1985 and was completed in 1992.

The library is equipped with teachers' reference books, Time Life series, Child Craft books, World Book Encyclopedia, Science magazines, story books, Reader's Digest and other weekly magazines. Students of all the classes including the pre-primary section are encouraged to use these books. Books are lent to the primary and high school students every week. The library has video cassettes both of educative value and for entertainment.

Lab facilities include Physics, Chemistry, Biology and Computer labs.

The auditorium has LCD, OHP, slide projector, speaker and mic's. This facility is utilized by the Staff and students for different activities in the college for both academic and Educational purpose. Department meetings are held there. There is an open-air stage in the quadrangle of the school.

The Health Centre promotes the well-being of the children. Parents who are doctors visit the school and conduct medical examination of the students periodically.

== Education ==
The school is known for producing students who have secured ranks in the Karnataka state-level examinations. Students have also won competitions like the Bangalore-round of the IT quiz competition organised by the Tata Consultancy Services. This quiz competition is the largest of its kind in India. Some of the notable alumni include Ankur Mehta, who is a vice president with Marsh and McLennan Companies.

== Sports ==
Teams from the school have won inter-school tournaments in Bangalore city, mostly in badminton.

== Cultural activities ==
The school has an auditorium which is used for cultural activities like dramas. The school has a student theatre group called as MES Ranga Shale which organises plays and the characters are enacted by students themselves.
