= Bangalore School of Speech and Drama =

Coordinates: 12°54′47.67″N 77°37′43.56″E

- 529, 16th A cross 3rd main, sector 6 HSR Layout; Bangalore, Karnataka; India

Information
- School type: Performing arts
- Founded: June 1998
- Founder: Zulfia Shaikh
- Director: Dr. Zulfia Shaikh
- Age range: 4 - 20
- Houses: Willy Wonka, Severus Snape, Henry Higgins, Peter Pan
- Colours: WW: Purple; SS: Black; HH: Red; PP: Green
- Nickname: BSSD
- Website: Official Site

The Bangalore School of Speech and Drama is a performing arts training institute located in Bangalore, Karnataka, India. It is affiliated with London Academy of Music and Dramatic Art (LAMDA).

== Foundation ==
Bangalore School of Speech and Drama was founded by Dr. Zulfia Shaikh in June 2001 to introduce acting, speaking, reciting, emoting and music as a serious topic to children. Initially starting off with a handful of students from around the locality, the productions put up by the school became immensely popular, attracting children from all over Bangalore. Currently there are over 500 students enrolled in the program which has taught thousands of children who have successfully completed their courses and the LAMDA exams since 2001.

== Introduction and productions ==
Every year LAMDA examiners come to Bangalore to administer the exams. Its students range from 5 to 20 years of age. The school puts on one major production per year. Each academic year starts from the first week of June and ends in the last week of March. There is a Summer Break for the months of April and May as the international tour and rehearsal for the major production takes place. A vacation is also given in the month of August as a Midterm Break.

The following are productions put up by the school:

- 2006: Peter Pan by Dr. Zulfia Shaikh
- 2008: Mozart Chocolates by Dr. Zulfia Shaikh
- 2009: A Grimm Night for Hans Christian Andersen by Dr. Zulfia Shaikh
- 2010: Peter Pan by Dr. Zulfia Shaikh
- 2011: Alice in Wonderland by Dr. Zulfia Shaikh
- 2011: Perspectives by Hasnain Shaikh
- 2012: Around The World In 8 Plays by Dr. Zulfia Shaikh and Hasnain Shaikh
- 2013: Ali Baba and the Forty Thieves by Dr. Zulfia Shaikh
- 2014: The Wizard of Oz by Dr. Zulfia Shaikh
- 2015: Matilda by Dr. Zulfia Shaikh
- 2017: The Lion The Witch and the Wardrobe
- 2018: Stories Of Scheherazade
- 2019: The Musical Adventures Of Oliver Twist
- 2023: Peter Pan by Dr. Zulfia Shaikh

== Summer workshop ==
Every year in the summer, usually between 1 and 16 April, a Summer Workshop is held. This was introduced for newcomers to get a feel of the curriculum and activities practiced in the school. An 'Unpaid internship program' has been launched for senior students to help out in the Summer Workshop; backstage and rehearsals. Every workshop is divided into 3 batches. Each batch puts up a small performance which is attended by the staff of the school and the students' families.

== International educational trips ==
Every year after the Summer Workshop, a few senior students are picked for an international tour. Students view performances in West End, London and Broadway, New York. Students are taken on these trips for usually about 7–14 days. Apart from watching theatre, they are also made to participate in workshops to give them an experience of performing abroad; taken for backstage tours of famous shows such as Wicked on Broadway; taken sightseeing to famous places of historical and modern significance, apart from tourist destinations. Parents of the students can also volunteer to travel along and take care of the entire group.

Till now, the students of BSSD have been taken to the following places:

- 2011: New York
- 2012: New York
- 2013: London and Paris
- 2014: New York
- 2015: London
- 2016: Chicago
- 2017: London

== Annual day ==
At the end of every year, an annual day is held as a competition between the students of the four houses. Awards such as Best Actor, Best Director, Best Production Manager, Best Use of Stage, etc. are also presented on the annual day. Each house is assigned one Director, usually the most senior student of that house and two Production Managers. Each house prepares a performance based on a topic given by the founder of the school. An improvisation act is also held to test the thinking and performing skills of the actors. It is followed by intense cheering by the attendees of the show for each house they support.
