= The International School, Bangalore =

Coordinates: 12°53′29.21″N 77°45′0.67″E

The International School Bangalore

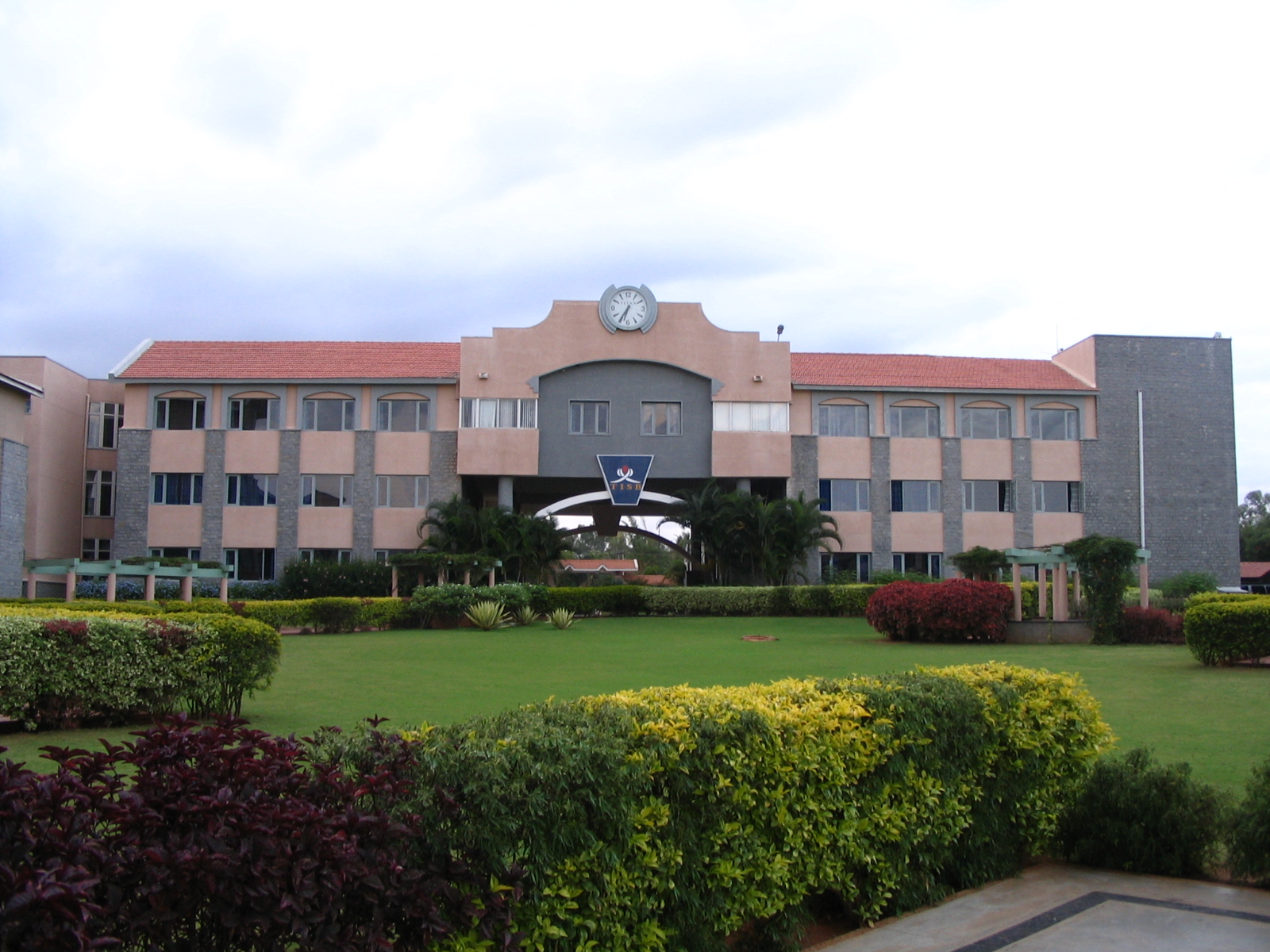
- Bangalore, Karnataka; India

Information
- Type: International day-and-boarding school
- Motto: Life is for learning
- Established: 2000
- Chairman: Dr K. P. Gopalkrishna
- Dean: Santhamma Gopalkrishna
- Director: Dr Bindu Hari
- Principal: Mrs Kate Reynolds
- Age range: 3 years to 18 years
- Enrollment: 1200+
- Language: English
- Alumni: alumni.tisb.org
- Website: www.tisb.org

The International School Bangalore (TISB) is a private educational institution located on Sarjapura Varthur road in Bangalore, India. TISB offers both International Baccalaureate and International General Certificate of Secondary Education (IGCSE) education.

== Academic Programmes ==
Students of TISB take the International General Certificate of Secondary Education (IGCSE) examinations at the end of the 10th grade, followed by the 2-year course in the IB Diploma.

TISB has both day schooling and boarding, and is a Co-Ed institution.

== History ==
It was founded in 2000 by K. P. Gopalkrishna, and is a sister school to the National Public Schools, Bangalore.The school is managed under the NAFL Trust, which oversees multiple educational institutions across India.

== After-School Programs ==
The International School Bangalore (TISB) offers a variety of after-school programs. These include clubs and activities such as economics and entrepreneurship.

== Vivum fest ==
TISB hosts an annual student-run cultural and academic fest, Vivum by students of class 12th .

== Awards and Rankings ==
- Awarded "International School of the Year" at the BSA Awards 2024.
- Ranked 38th globally among IB schools and 3rd in India for the 2024 cohort.
- In the 2024–25 rankings by EducationWorld, the school was ranked first in the International Day-cum-Boarding School category
