= Central Board of Secondary Education =

School education board in India

- Seal of the Central Board of Secondary Education
- Abbreviation: CBSE
- Formation: 1 July 1962 (64 years ago)
- Type: Governmental Board of Education
- Legal status: Active
- Headquarters: Delhi, India
- Official language: Hindi; English
- Chairperson: Lokhande Prashant Sitaram, IAS
- Parent organisation: Ministry of Education
- Affiliations: 29,179 schools (2024)
- Website: www.cbse.gov.in

The Central Board of Secondary Education (CBSE) is a national-level board of education in India for public and private schools, controlled and managed by the Government of India. Established in 1929 by a government resolution, the Board was an experiment in inter-state integration and cooperation in the sphere of secondary education. There are more than 27,000 schools in India and 240 schools in 28 foreign countries affiliated with the CBSE. All schools affiliated with CBSE follow the NCERT curriculum, especially those in classes 9 to 12. The current Chairperson of CBSE is Lokhande Prashant Sitaram, IAS

The constitution of the Board was amended in 1952 to give its present name, the Central Board of Secondary Education. The Board was reconstituted on 1 July 1962 to make its services available to students and various educational institutions across the country.

== History ==
The first education board to be set up in India was the United Provinces Board of High School and Intermediate Education in 1921, which was under the jurisdiction of Rajputana, Gwalior and Central India. In 1929, In response to the representation made by the Government of United Provinces, the Government of India suggested to set up a joint board for all the areas and it was named as the Board of High School and Intermediate Education Rajputana. This included Gwalior, Ajmer, Central India and Merwara. In 1962, The board was reconstituted to extend its services, merging with the Delhi Board of Higher Secondary Education and thus it became the Central Board of Secondary Education.

=== Number of applicants by year ===
Year	CBSE 12th board			CBSE 10th board		
Year	Registered	Appeared	Qualified	Registered	Appeared	Qualified
1992	–	153,492	105,120	–	280,268	175,851
1993	–	162,019	113,618	–	292,013	193,291
1994	–	182,332	134,894	–	301,610	209,419
1995	–	195,026	138,264	–	318,235	201,694
1996	–	208,492	150,086	–	330,795	212,349
1997	–	205,067	150,323	–	385,858	248,001
1998	–	222,000	161,252	–	409,695	259,088
1999	–	253,253	189,149	–	438,137	282,093
2000	–	265,346	202,579	–	466,990	305,290
2001	–	286,268	215,287	–	481,455	320,690
2002	342,806	327,567	246,340	529,919	515,752	358,613
2003	366,000	352,105	259,102	562,000	549,321	373,652
2004	–	380,469	289,144	–	557,149	402,377
2005	420,240	404,856	314,998	605,477	591,341	441,137
2006	454,480	435,648	346,565	647,992	632,014	487,650
2007	502,688	484,308	390,550	705,152	688,729	581,594
2008	549,344	530,199	428,993	765,095	748,007	651,373
2009	637,976	612,103	495,782	813,413	805,421	715,529
2010	700,983	672,918	537,467	902,747	886,338	791,304
2011	770,043	756,279	628,266	1,062,322	1,058,791	1,016,282
2012	815,749	802,068	649,425	1,179,182	1,177,111	1,157,848
2013	944,721	920,038	776,215	1,257,893	1,256,125	1,238,996
2014	1,028,928	1,007,322	967,993	1,327,350	1,326,100	1,312,238
2015	1,040,515	1,016,369	788,822	1,370,637	1,369,087	1,328,935
2016	1,065,179	1,041,482	824,355	1,491,293	1,489,021	1,431,861
2017	1,096,317	1,076,760	832,536	1,668,567	1,660,123	1,509,383
2018	1,184,386	1,162,645	918,763	1,638,464	1,625,967	1,408,588
2019	1,218,393	1,205,484	1,005,427	1,774,299	1,761,078	1,604,428
2020	1,203,595	1,192,961	1,059,080	1,885,885	1,873,015	1,713,121
2021	1,430,188	1,304,561	1,296,318	2,150,608	2,097,128	2,076,997
2022	1,444,341	1,435,366	1,330,662	2,109,208	2,093,978	1,976,668
2023	1,680,256	1,660,511	1,450,174	2,184,117	2,165,805	2,016,779
2024	1,633,730	1,621,224	1,426,420	2,251,812	2,238,827	2,095,467
2025	1,704,367	1,692,794	1,496,307	2,385,079	2,371,939	2,221,636
2026	1,780,365	1,768,968	1,507,109	2,483,479	2,471,777	2,316,008

== Languages ==
CBSE offers academic subjects in 40 different languages, which are Arabic, Assamese, Bahasa Melayu, Bengali, Bhutia, Bodo, English, French, German, Gujarati, Gurung, Hindi Course-A, Hindi Course-B, Japanese, Kannada, Kashmiri, Kokborok, Lepcha, Limboo, Malayalam, Meitei (Manipuri), Marathi, Mizo, Nepali, Odia, Persian, Punjabi, Rai, Russian, Sanskrit, Sindhi, Spanish, Sherpa, Tamang, Tamil, Tangkhul, Telugu AP, Telugu Telangana, Thai, Tibetan, Urdu Course A and Urdu Course B.

== Affiliations ==
CBSE affiliates all Kendriya Vidyalayas, all Jawahar Navodaya Vidyalaya, private schools, and most of the schools approved by the central government of India. All State Government schools in Delhi are affiliated with CBSE. There are 1,138 Kendriya Vidyalayas, 3,011 Government Schools, 16,741 Independent Schools, 595 Jawahar Novodaya Vidyalayas and 14 Central Tibetan Schools.

== Examinations ==
CBSE conducts the final examinations for Class 10 and Class 12 every year in February and March. The results are announced by the end of May. The board earlier conducted the AIEEE Examination for admission to undergraduate courses in engineering and architecture in colleges across India, however, the AIEEE exam was merged with the IIT-Joint Entrance Exam (JEE) in 2013. The standard examination is now called JEE (Main) and is henceforth conducted by National Testing Agency.

CBSE also conducted AIPMT (All India Pre-Medical Test) for admission to major medical colleges in India. In 2014, the conduct of the National Eligibility Test for the grant of a junior research fellowship and eligibility for an assistant professor in institutions of higher learning was outsourced to CBSE.

Apart from these tests, CBSE also conducts the Central Teacher Eligibility Test and the Class X optional proficiency test. With the addition of NET in 2014, the CBSE became the largest exam-conducting body in the world.

On 10 November 2017, the Union Cabinet, chaired by Prime Minister Narendra Modi, cleared a proposal to create a National Testing Agency (NTA) as the premier autonomous body for conducting entrance examinations in the country. Beginning in 2018, various exams previously conducted by the CBSE were transferred to the NTA, including National Eligibility cum Entrance Test (Undergraduate), Joint Entrance Examination – Main, National Eligibility Test, Central Universities Common Entrance Test and others.

In 2025, CBSE decided to conduct two board examinations from the academic year 2025–26 to ease the pressure on students. CBSE has also rationalised much of the content in its syllabus after the COVID period to ease the children

== Promotion criteria ==
=== Class 10 ===
For promotion from the Secondary level (Class IX-X) to the Senior Secondary level (Class XI-XII), a student must obtain, for all subjects (or best five if six subjects are taken), 33% overall, without any minimum theory mark requirement. Initially, the passing criteria were set such that a student had to get 33% in both the theory and practical components. However, an exemption was initially granted to students who wrote the exam in 2018, as they had gone through the old CCE system the previous year. However, CBSE later extended this relief for students writing the exam from 2019 and later as well. Students who do not manage to pass up to two subjects can write the compartment in those subjects in July. Those who fail a compartment or three or more subjects must retake all subjects taken the following year.

=== Class 12 ===
For class 12 students, the promotion criteria are 33% overall, with 33% in "both" theory and practical examinations (if applicable). Students who do not pass exactly one subject can write the compartment for that subject in July. Those who fail a compartment, or who fail two subjects or more, must retake all subjects taken the next year.

== Grading ==
For the Class 10 and Class 12 exams, CBSE (along with the marks obtained) includes the positional grade, which is based on the average performance of students in that subject. Consequently, the cutoffs required to obtain a particular grade vary from year to year.

Grading system by CBSE
Grade	Criteria
A1	Top 1/8 of passed students in that subject
A2	Next 1/8 of passed students in that subject
B1	Next 1/8 of passed students in that subject
B2	Next 1/8 of passed students in that subject
C1	Next 1/8 of passed students in that subject
C2	Next 1/8 of passed students in that subject
D1	Next 1/8 of passed students in that subject
D2	Last 1/8 of passed students in that subject
E	Failed students (in either theory, practical or overall)

The cutoffs required to obtain a particular grade in 2018 are listed below:

Class 12 (2018)
Grade	English Core	Mathematics	Chemistry	Physics	Biology	Biotechnology	Engineering Drawing	Computer Science	Economics	Accountancy	Business Studies	Informatics Practices	Multimedia/Web Tech	Psychology	Sociology
A1	89	95	91	90	90	95	98	93	92	84	93	94		95	87
A2	84	84	81	82	84	91	95	88	85	73	83	91			78
B1	78	73	73	75	79	86	92	83	78	65	75	87	82	84	73
B2	72	63	67	69	74	83	89	78	70	59	67		78	79	66
C1	65	55	63	64	68	76	85	72	63	55	60	79	74	73	
C2	57	46	60	61	62		80		55	49			67	67	
D1	45	42	52	54	55				47	45				57	
D2	33	33	Variable (33% theory and practical pass required)												

Class 10 (2018)
Grade	English Language & Literature	Mathematics	Science	Social Science	Malayalam	Hindi	French
A1	92	92	87	90	96	93	97
A2	87	81	76	82	93	88	95
B1	83	70	67	74	90	83	92
B2	78	60	58	66	87	78	87
C1	73	50	49	58	84	72	82
C2	66	42	41	49	80	65	74
D1	56	34	34	41	73	54	62
D2	33 (minimum for all subjects)						

=== During CCE ===
During 2010–2017, when CBSE implemented a CCE (Continuous and Comprehensive Evaluation) for Class X students, only the grades obtained by the student were mentioned in the report card in a 9-point grading scale, which translates as follows:

Former grading scale (CCE)
Grade	Criteria
A1	>90%
A2	81–90%
B1	71–80%
B2	61–70%
C1	51–60%
C2	41–50%
D	33–40%
E1	21–32%
E2	0–20%

== Results ==
=== 2016 ===
Number of (passed) students obtaining a particular CGPA in Class 10 by gender
CGPA	MALE	FEMALE	TOTAL
10	85,316	83,225	1,68,541
9.8	26,313	24,545	50,858
9.6	28,522	24,223	52,745
9.4	35,587	25,882	61,469
9.2	33,674	25,171	58,845
9	35,167	26,270	61,437
8.8	36,453	26,154	62,607
8.6	37,532	25,945	63,477
8.4	38,590	25,383	63,973
8.2	37,681	24,663	62,344
8	38,248	24,217	62,465
7.8	38,560	23,607	62,167
7.6	37,804	22,680	60,484
7.4	36,814	21,410	58,224
7.2	35,287	20,497	55,784
7	34,755	19,803	54,558
6.8	33,824	18,677	52,501
6.6	32,099	17,559	49,658
6.4	29,774	16,428	46,202
6.2	27,367	15.509	42,876
6	25,542	14,472	40,014
5.8	22,568	13,094	35,662
5.6	18,126	11,128	29,254
5.4	13,206	8,684	21,890
5.2	9,120	6,142	15,262
5	6,116	4,036	10,152
4.8	3,582	2,360	5,942
4.6	2,074	1,182	3,256
4.4	893	527	1,420
4.2	294	151	445
4	50	31	81
TOTAL	8,40,938	5,73,655	14,14,593
AVERAGE	7.91	8.14	8.00

Number of (passed) students obtaining a particular CGPA in Class 10 by exam mode
CGPA	BOARD	SCHOOL	TOTAL
10	92,816	75,725	1,68,541
9.8	32,372	18,486	50,858
9.6	32,115	20,630	52,745
9.4	32,302	29,167	61,469
9.2	33,725	25,120	58,845
9	36,361	25,076	61,437
8.8	36,673	25,934	62,607
8.6	36,026	27,451	63,477
8.4	35,232	28,741	63,973
8.2	35,362	26,982	62,344
8	35,185	27,280	62,465
7.8	33,969	28,198	62,167
7.6	31,825	28,659	60,484
7.4	29,836	28,388	58,224
7.2	28,045	27,739	55,784
7	26,238	28,320	54,558
6.8	23,913	28,588	52,501
6.6	21,284	28,374	49,658
6.4	18,782	27,420	46,202
6.2	16,785	26,091	42,876
6	14,365	25,649	40,014
5.8	12,150	23,512	35,662
5.6	9,351	19,903	29,254
5.4	6,861	15,029	21,890
5.2	4,978	10,284	15,262
5	3,628	6,524	10,152
4.8	2,278	3,664	5,942
4.6	1,236	2,020	3,256
4.4	549	871	1,420
4.2	137	308	445
4	17	64	81
TOTAL	7,24,396	6,90,197	14,14,593
AVERAGE	8.21	7.79	8.00

== Moderation ==
Mark distributions for each subject and overall average in CBSE Class 12 examinations 2015

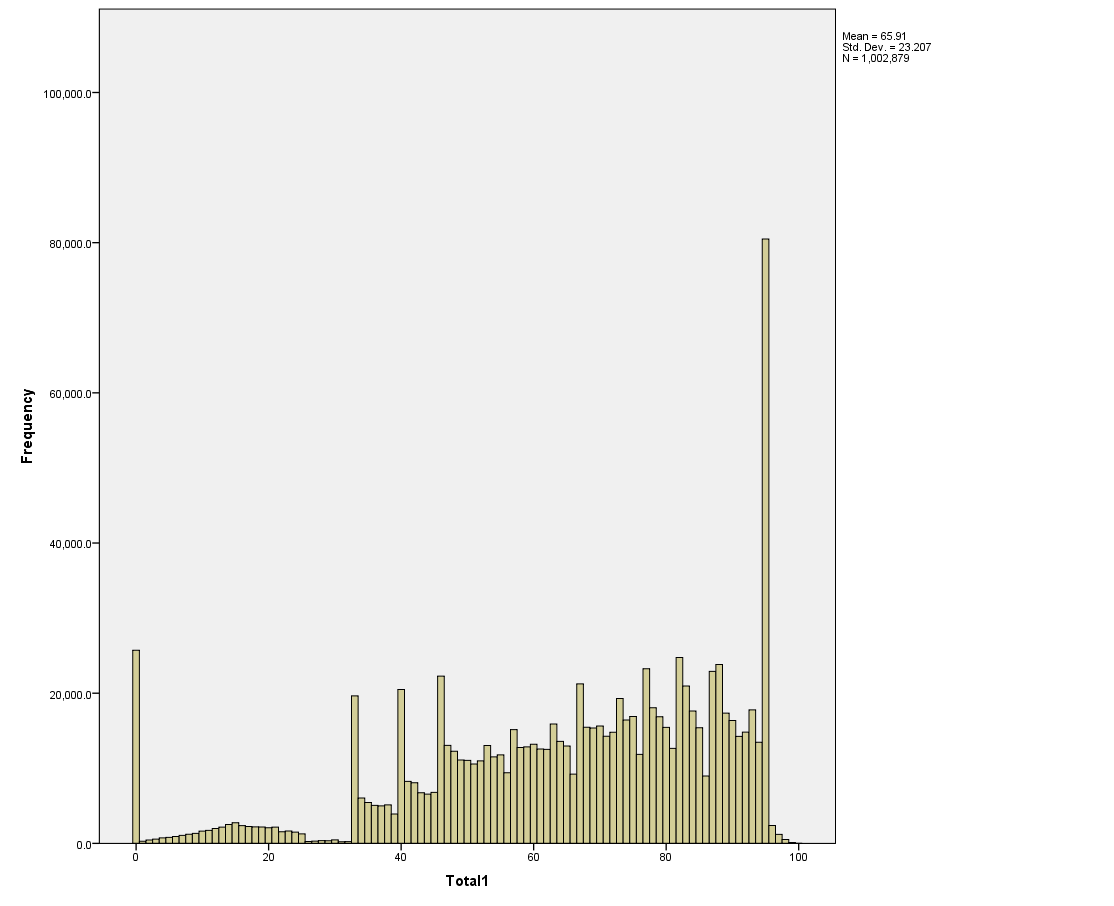
Subject 1 mark distribution. Note the unusual peak for 95, 33, and a few other marks and a sudden drop in frequency for 96 marks and above.

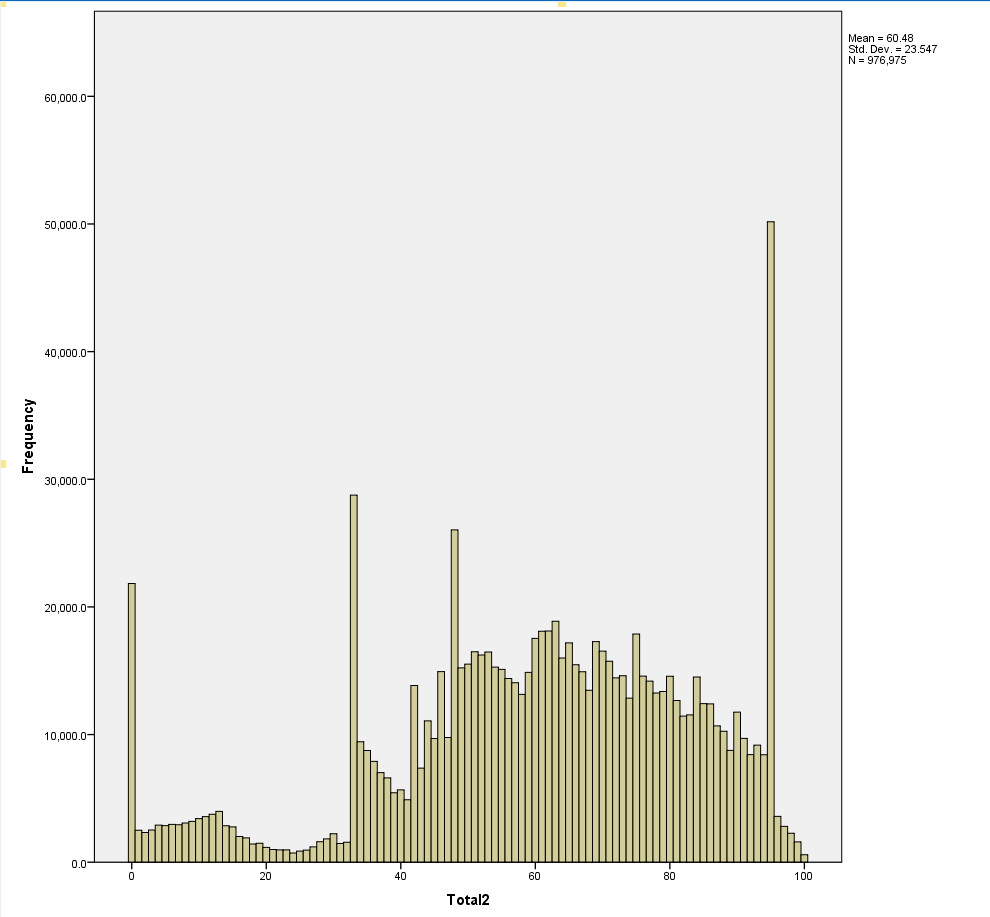
Subject 2 mark distribution. The peaks still stand.

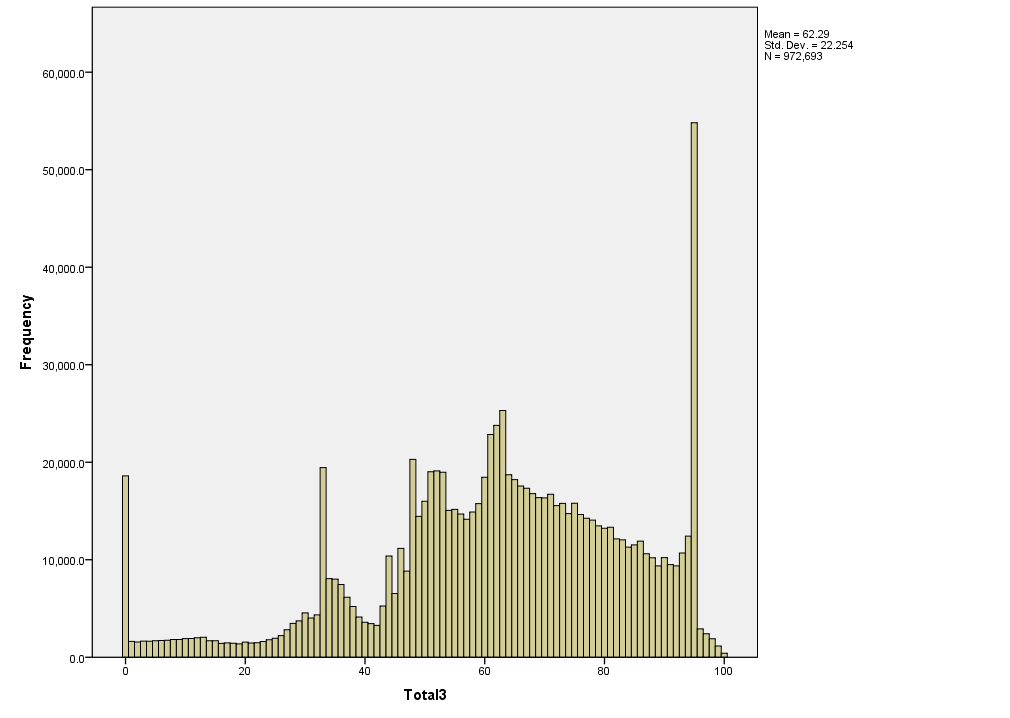
Subject 3 mark distribution. The peaks still stand, but fewer students are scoring zero in the exam, which can be attributed to science students who skipped the theory exam having their practical mark alone counted.

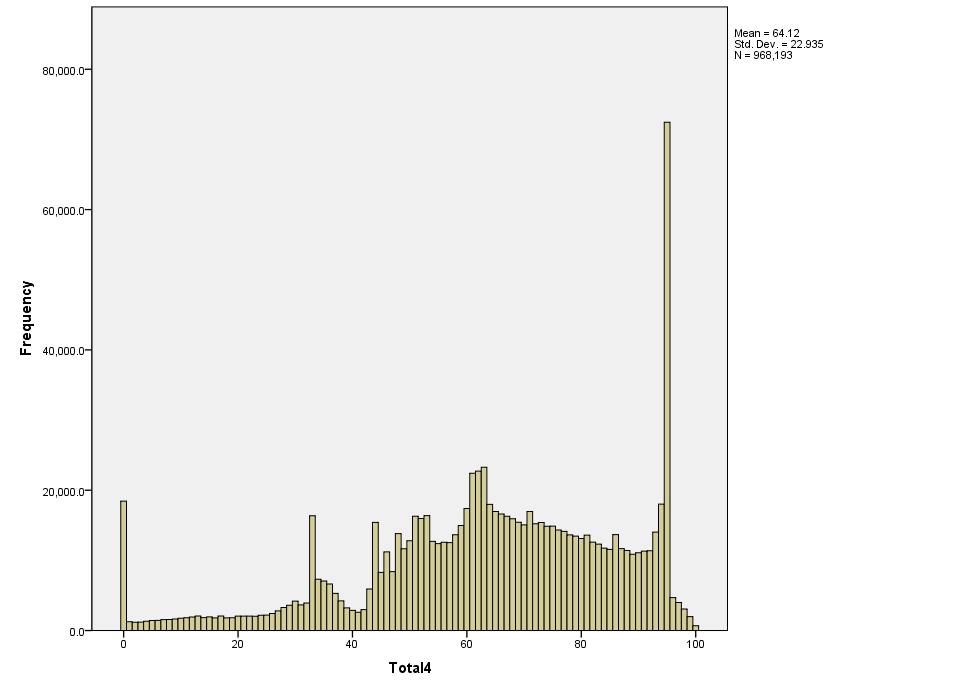
Subject 4 mark distribution. The peaks still stand.

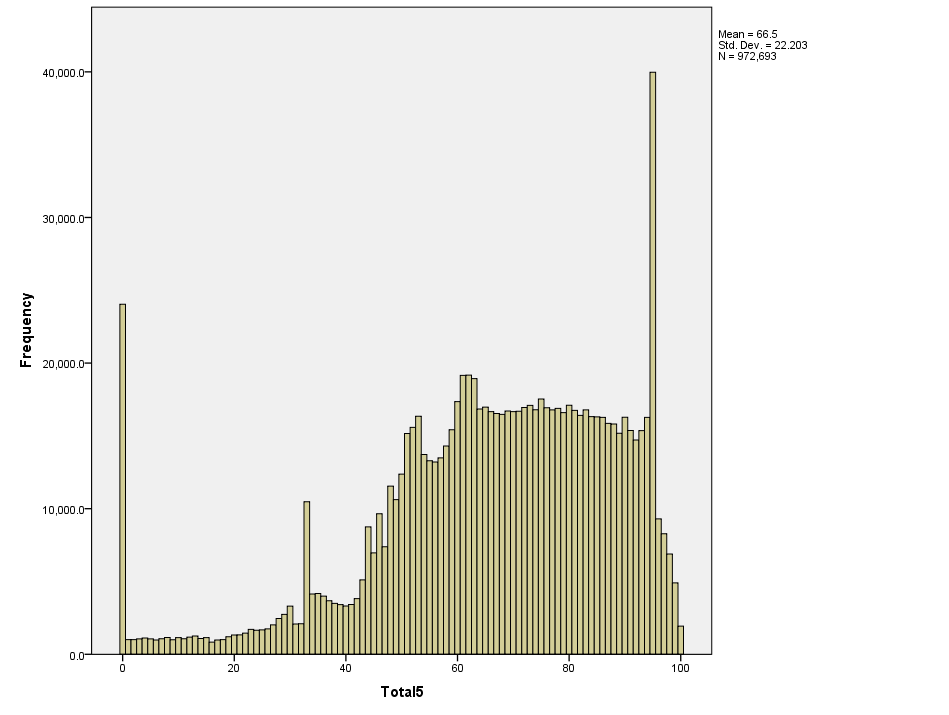
Subject 5 mark distribution. The peaks still stand, though lower this time, as subjects like Computer Science do not have any moderation applied.

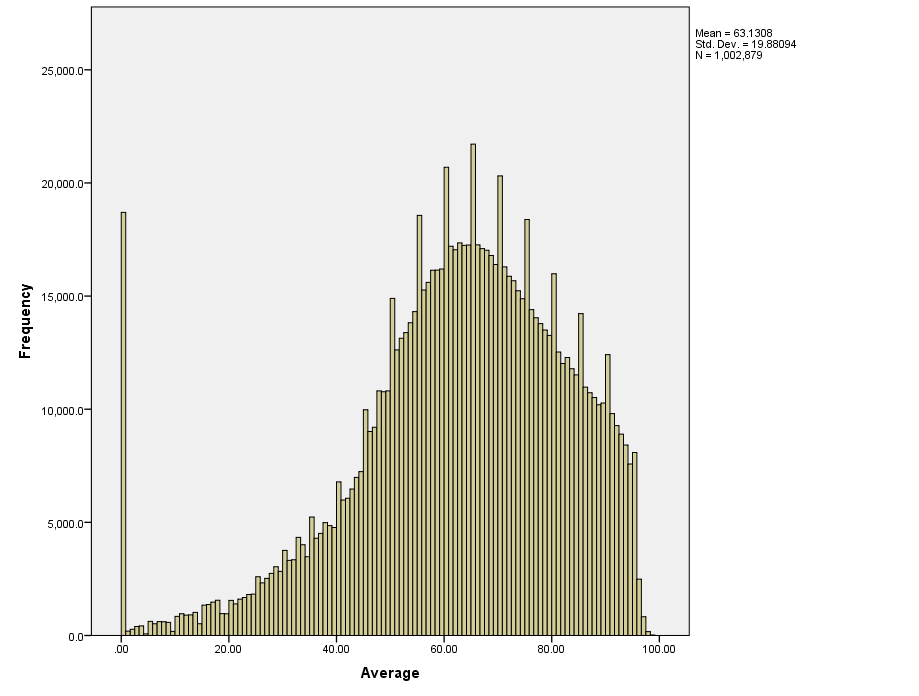
Overall average (first five subjects excluding any additional subjects if taken) for the same class and year. The peak on zero marks could mostly be attributed to students who did not show up for the exams at all. The distribution in this case is much more normal and symmetrical than the individual subjects' distribution.

It is the practice adopted by CBSE of "tweaking" candidates' marks to account for paper difficulties and variations. This has been criticized in the past for inflating students' marks in a hyper-competitive society where even one mark counts, and CBSE is in the process of ending it. In 2017, CBSE informed that it would end moderation entirely, but its decision was challenged by a court case at the Delhi High Court, which ruled that moderation should continue for that year.

Except for 2018, moderation was applied to account for variations in region sets (as then students in different regions would be answering different question papers). In 2018, when everyone around the world answered the same questions, This practice was renamed as standardisation, with the CBSE gradually phasing out the practice with the reduction in subjects that were given the offset.

In 2018, Mathematics, Physics, Chemistry, and Accountancy were given a +9 offset, Business Studies a +6, and English a +3. In 2019, moderation gave up to 11 extra marks:

Offset applied for CBSE Class 12 exams (Delhi) [0 = no moderation]
Subject	Offset (2019)	Offset (2018)	Offset (2017)	Offset (2016)
Mathematics	11	9	10	15
Physics	11	9	9	8
Chemistry	10	9	9	7
Biology	5	0	3	0
Political Science	6	0	5	5
Economics	5	0	3	6
Business Studies	5	6	6	11
Sociology	2	0	0	6
Geography	1	0	0	8

The total mark obtained by a student through moderation cannot exceed 95; if it does, it is "capped" at 95 unless the student's actual mark is 96 or higher. This is why a mark of 95 is relatively common for such subjects and why it is "much" tougher to get 96 than to get 95.

Moderation was also applied in the infamous CBSE Class 12 mathematics papers of 2015 and 2016, which created a huge furore as students and teachers complained that the exams were too harsh. Despite a reportedly heavy offset of +16 (+15 for Delhi), students' marks reduced (especially for 2016), as while the A1 cutoff was stable (90), the A2 cutoff reduced to 77, with other grades also experiencing a dip in cutoff.

Moderation can also take the form of giving grace marks to enable students who have scored near the pass mark to pass. This is why marks between 25 and 33 are unheard of in subjects like Mathematics, and it also explains why the difference between the D1 and D2 cutoffs is sometimes minimal.

== 2018 question paper leak ==
In March 2018, reports surfaced that the CBSE Class 10 mathematics and Class 12 economics question papers had been leaked. In response, CBSE announced that these exams will be cancelled and re-exams will be conducted. However, CBSE later announced that there would be no re-exam for the Class 10 mathematics paper because the paper leak may have been confined to a few alleged beneficiaries.

On 7 April 2018, economics teacher Rakesh Kumar and two other employees of a private school in Una, Himachal Pradesh were arrested for leaking the Class 12 economics paper. According to the police, Rakesh Kumar had gone inside the strong room of a bank to pick up packets of computer science question papers but also picked up a packet of economics question paper. He asked a student to make a handwritten copy of the question paper (to avoid being traced from the handwriting). He then sent photos of the handwritten copy of the paper on WhatsApp to a relative in Punjab. This relative shared the photos with her son and nephew, who shared them with their friends on WhatsApp groups, from where it was forwarded to other WhatsApp groups. On 12 April 2018, the police said that Rakesh Kumar, who leaked the class 12 economics paper, had leaked class 10 mathematics paper also. Consequently, the Central Board of Secondary Education has put in place a system of "encrypted" question papers, which are supposed to be printed by the schools half an hour before the exam starts.

== Changes for the 2019 exam ==
For the 2019 exam, CBSE decided that vocational exams (which very few students take) would be held earlier, in mid/late February, rather than in March for most other exams. This was to ensure the exams were finished earlier.

For many core subjects, the number of internal choices (where students pick one answer from two) was increased. The English (Core) paper of Class 12 was modified in a bid to make it less 'speedy'.

== Changes for 2020 exam ==
The Central Board of Secondary Education (CBSE) has been conducting two separate Mathematics examinations in the class 10 board examination, starting from the 2020 session. Mathematics exam till 2019 was Mathematics (Standard), and an easier version, Mathematics (Basic), has been introduced.

The option to choose mathematics is available on the registration form for the Class 10 CBSE board examination. Candidates are required to select their test choice while filling out the registration form for the CBSE Class 10 board examination 2020.

Minister of Education, MoE (previously Minister of Human Resource Department, HRD), amid the coronavirus outbreak had ordered rescheduling of pending examinations. The exams rescheduled were to be conducted between 1 and 15 July. On 26 June, CBSE released as circular which cancelled the remaining exams and give scores based on the scores of the exams already taken by students. Some students of Delhi who were able to provide three or fewer exams were scored as per their performance in internal exams. This decision came after a judicial ruling.

== Effect of COVID-19 pandemic on 2021 and 2022 exams ==
Due to the rapid increase in COVID-19 cases across the country, the CBSE cancelled the 10th class board exams and postponed the 12th class exams.

Like the 10th, Class 12th Board Exam 2021 has also been cancelled. Prime Minister Narendra Modi decided on this after a long meeting on 1 June 2021.

Later, in a letter dated 5 July 2021, CBSE announced a special assessment scheme for the board examinations of classes X and XII for the session 2021–22. The academic year was divided into two terms, with approximately 50% of the syllabus in each, to increase the likelihood that the CBSE would conduct boards and avoid relying on schools to declare results.

The Term 1 examination was successfully conducted by CBSE in objective mode from 22 November to 12 December 2021 for Class 10 and from 16 November to 30 December 2021 for Class 12. However, the Term-I examination was criticised by many for having wrong answer keys, tough question papers and wrong or controversial questions, with a question being dropped in Sociology exam of class 12 and a paragraph in the English Language and Literature exam for class 10 by CBSE following which CBSE dropped the experts who set the Sociology and English paper from paper-setting panels. The Term 2 examination was conducted from 26 April 2022 for both Class 10 and 12 and ended on 24 May for Class 10 and 15 June for Class 12. The Class 12 results were declared on 22 July 2022, followed by Class 10 results on the same day.

== 2026 QR code Rick roll incident ==
During the 2026 CBSE Class 12 board examinations, the question papers for mathematics exam held on 9 March 2026 attracted widespread attention online after students reported that scanning the QR code printed on the papers redirected users to the music video of "Never Gonna Give You Up" by Rick Astley. The unexpected link resembled the internet prank known as Rickrolling. Images and videos of the question paper circulated on social media following the exam, prompting confusion and humor among students. The CBSE later issued a clarification stating that the mathematics question papers were genuine and that the security of the examination had not been compromised. The board noted that QR codes are included as a security feature to verify the authenticity of examination papers and stated that the issue would be reviewed to prevent similar incidents in the future.

== 2026 On-Screen Marking (OSM) Controversy ==
In May 2026, the CBSE faced widespread criticism following the introduction of its digital On-Screen Marking (OSM) system for the Class 12 board examinations. Under this new framework, approximately 98.66 lakh answer books were scanned and evaluated digitally by around 70,000 evaluators across the country. Following the declaration of Class 12 results on 13 May 2026, a substantial drop in the overall pass percentage from 88.39% in the previous year to 85.2% sparked panic among students and parents.

Large-scale complaints emerged on social media platforms as students alleged getting unexpectedly low marks especially in core subjects like Physics, Chemistry, Biology, and Mathematics. Students and teachers criticised the board for charging too much fees for answer sheet photocopies even though the board already has all the answer sheets of all the students scanned. Due to this the board decided to significantly reduce the charged fee.

Upon applying for scanned copies under the board's verification process, numerous students reported serious technical glitches, incorrect fee deduction and payment gateway failures. The board said that the portal faced unprecedented traffic and several attempts of unauthorised interference. The initial deadline of 22 May for receiving the answersheet was extended multiple times till 25 May. The CBSE received 4,04,319 applications from students for obtaining scanned copies of answer books, far higher than the previous year, which indicates the lack of trust in the new system. Students who received the copies flagged blurred answer sheets, missing pages, and, in some cases, received another student’s answer book.

The controversy intensified significantly when a Delhi-based student, Vedant Shrivastava, shared evidence on social media that his Physics answer sheet uploaded under his roll number featured different handwriting and belonged to someone else. Soon after, he became the target of trolling and abusive comments online. Some called him "anti-national", while others labelled him "Pakistani". Among those who initially called the student a "Pakistani" was Doordarshan News journalist Ashok Shrivastav. He later apologised, but his remarks sparked massive backlash online. After the complaint went viral, CBSE officially acknowledged the technical error, issued the correct answer sheet to the student, and promised to rectify his result.

The board faced further backlash following allegations that it attempted to manage public perception rather than addressing structural evaluation errors. Reports surfaced indicating that CBSE had allegedly circulated a communication toolkit to schools and forced school principals to flood social media with coordinated videos and posts defending its controversial On-Screen Marking System (OSM). Independent observers and online watchdogs noted a coordinated pattern where multiple school principals and institutions published videos using identical phrasing to praise the digital evaluation system. Furthermore, students on platforms like Reddit alleged that certain schools were putting immense pressure on them to upload public statements defending the accuracy of the OSM system.

== Regional offices ==
CBSE Regional Offices
Regional Office	States/UTs/Areas covered
Ajmer	Gujarat and Rajasthan
Bengaluru	Karnataka
Bhopal	Madhya Pradesh
Bhubaneswar	West Bengal, Odisha and Chhattisgarh
Chandigarh	Chandigarh, Punjab, Jammu and Kashmir and Ladakh
Chennai	Andaman & Nicobar Islands, Puducherry and Tamil Nadu
Dehradun	Uttarakhand and a few districts of Uttar Pradesh (Badaun, Bijnour, J.P.Nagar/ Amroha, Moradabad, Muzaffarnagar, Rampur, Saharanpur and Sambhal)
Delhi East	East Delhi, South East Delhi, South Delhi, South West Delhi, New Delhi and Shahdara districts of Delhi, and foreign schools
Delhi West	West Delhi, North West Delhi, North Delhi, North East Delhi and Central Delhi districts of Delhi
Guwahati	Assam, Nagaland, Manipur, Meghalaya, Tripura, Sikkim, Arunachal Pradesh and Mizoram
Noida	Agra, Aligarh, Baghpat, Bareilly, Bulandshahar, Etah, Firozabad, Gautam Budh Nagar, Ghaziabad, Hapur, Hathras, Kasganj / Kashi Ram Nagar, Mainpuri, Mathura, Meerut, Pilibhit, Shahjahanpur and Shamli districts of Uttar Pradesh
Panchkula	Haryana and Himachal Pradesh
Patna	Bihar and Jharkhand
Prayagraj	Ambedkar Nagar, Amethi, Auraiya, Ayodhya, Azamgarh, Bahraich, Ballia, Balrampur, Banda, Barabanki, Basti, Bhadohi, Chandauli, Chitrkoot, Deoria, Etawah, Farukkhabad, Fatehpur, Ghazipur, Gonda, Gorakhpur, Hamirpur, Hardoi, Jalaun, Jaunpur, Jhanshi, Kannauj, Kanpur Dehat, Kanpur Nagar, Kaushambi, Kushi Nagar, Lakhimpur Kheri, Lalitpur, Lucknow, Maharajganj, Mahoba, Mau, Mirjapur, Pratapgarh, Prayagraj, RaiBareilly, Sant Kabir Nagar, Shrabasti, Siddharth Nagar, Sitapur, Sonbhadra, Sultanpur, Unnao and Varanasi districts of Uttar Pradesh
Pune	Maharashtra, Goa and Dadra and Nagar Haveli and Daman and Diu
Thiruvananthapuram	Kerala and Lakshadweep
Vijayawada	Andhra Pradesh and Telangana

== Foreign schools ==
According to the official website of CBSE, there are 28 government- and private-affiliated schools in various countries outside India. The reason for their establishment is mainly to serve the Indian community abroad, or at least children or relatives of Indian diplomats.

In countries where the population of Indian nationals surpasses the country's native population or where they form a substantial share of the population, like Saudi Arabia, the United Arab Emirates, Oman, Qatar, Bahrain, etc., Indian embassies have established CBSE schools and allowed Indians or locals to establish private CBSE schools serving the needs of Indians in those particular countries.

But in countries where Indians do not reside, Indian diplomatic missions have established schools, such as those in Russia and Iran, which mainly serve the children of diplomats.

== See also ==
- All India Senior School Certificate Examination
- All India Secondary School Examination
- CBSE expression series – an essay/painting competition aimed to make students aware of the history of women and men who have served the nation of India
- Council for the Indian School Certificate Examinations (CISCE)
- National Council of Educational Research and Training(NCERT)
- NCERT textbook controversies
- National Institute of Open Schooling (NIOS)
- Secondary School Leaving Certificate (SSLC)
- Junior Science Talent Search Examination
- Uttarakhand Board of School Education (UBSE)
- National Public School Group of Educational Institutions (NPS)
