= Educational institutions in Ernakulam district =

Ernakulam District is a district of the state of Kerala in southern India.

== Institutions of higher learning in Ernakulam District ==
- School of Engineering, CUSAT
- St. Teresa's College
- Maharaja's College
- Sacred Heart College, Thevara
- St. Albert's College
- Cochin University
- Rajagiri College of Social Sciences
- Mar Athanasius College, Kothamangalam
- Mar Athanasius College of Engineering, Kothamangalam
- Rajagiri School of Engineering & Technology
- SCMS School of Engineering and Technology
- Amrita Institute of Medical Sciences
- Amrita School of Arts and Science
- School of Communication and Management Studies
- Model Engineering College
- Central Institute of Fisheries Nautical and Engineering Training
- Central Marine Fisheries Research Institute
- RLV College of Music
- Cochin College
- Xavier Institute of Management and Entrepreneurship
- CBSE Centre of Excellence Kochi
- Westford Institute of Film Technology

== Primary education ==
The pattern of primary education is essentially the same all over the state. There are government owned schools and government aided schools, which are affiliated to the Kerala State Education Board. A few privately owned schools are also affiliated to the system. Most of the schools owned by private organisations or individuals are affiliated to the Central Board for Secondary Education (CBSE). Indian Certificate of Secondary Education (ICSE) have some schools affiliated to them as well. The state education board offers both Malayalam and English medium instruction, while the other boards offer English medium alone. There are a few schools that follow international curricula, such as IB and IGCSE.

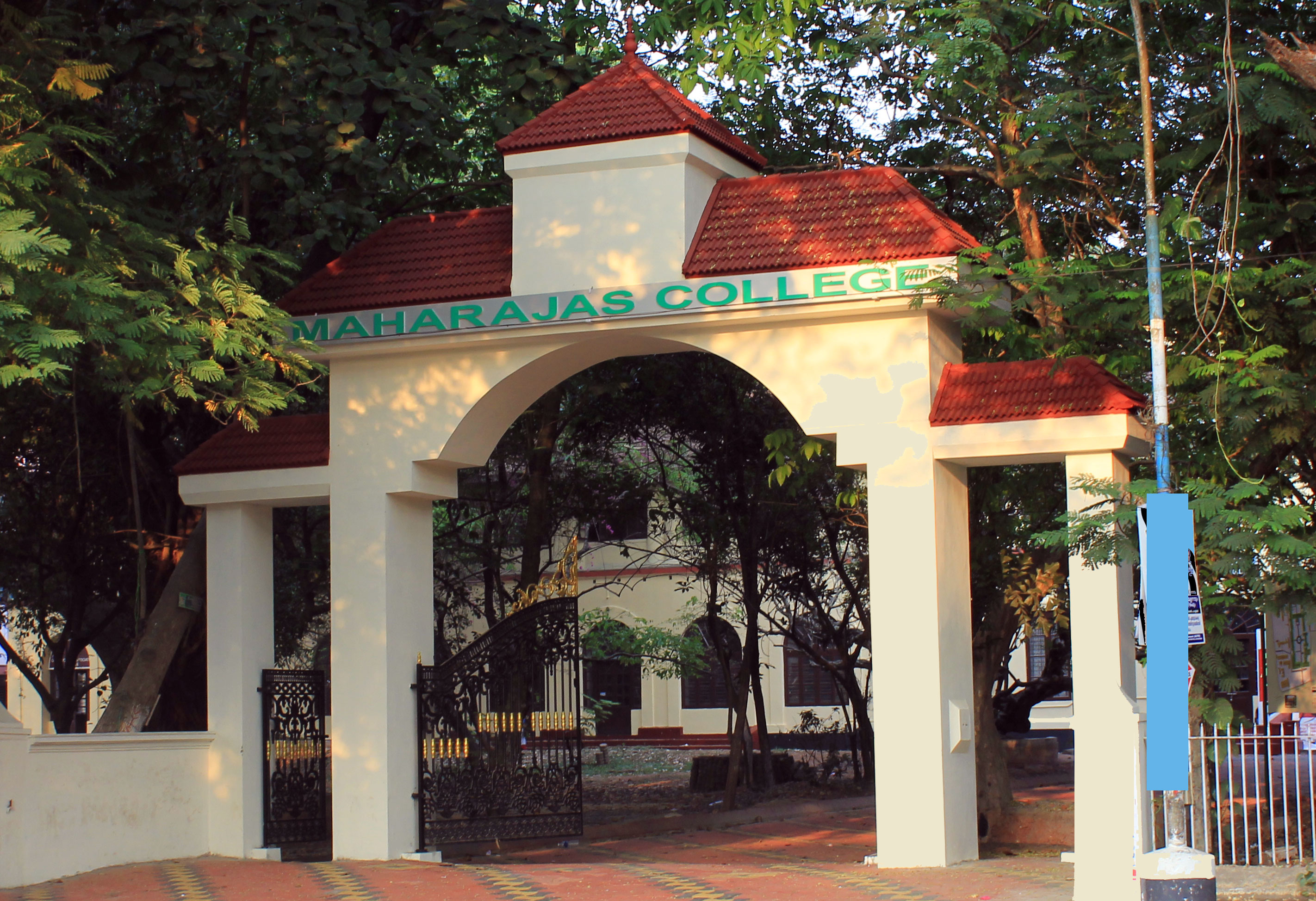
Established in 1875, the Maharaja's College is one of the oldest colleges in the state

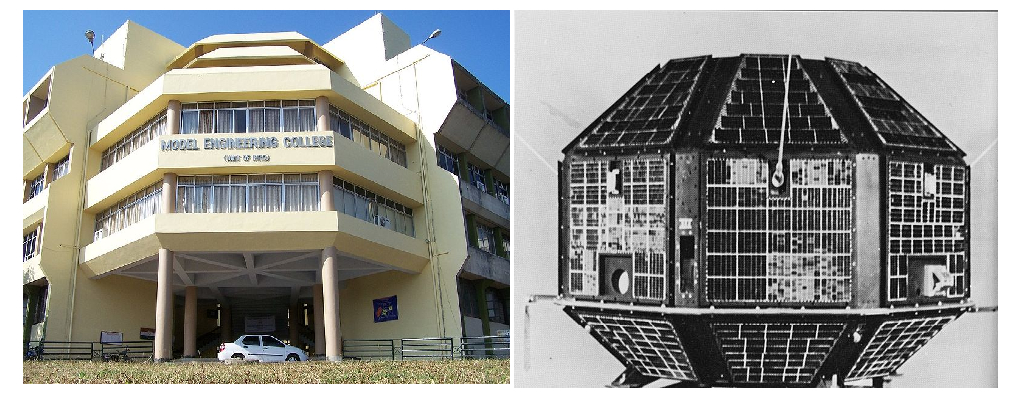
The main building of Model Engineering College was inspired from India's first satellite, Aryabhatta

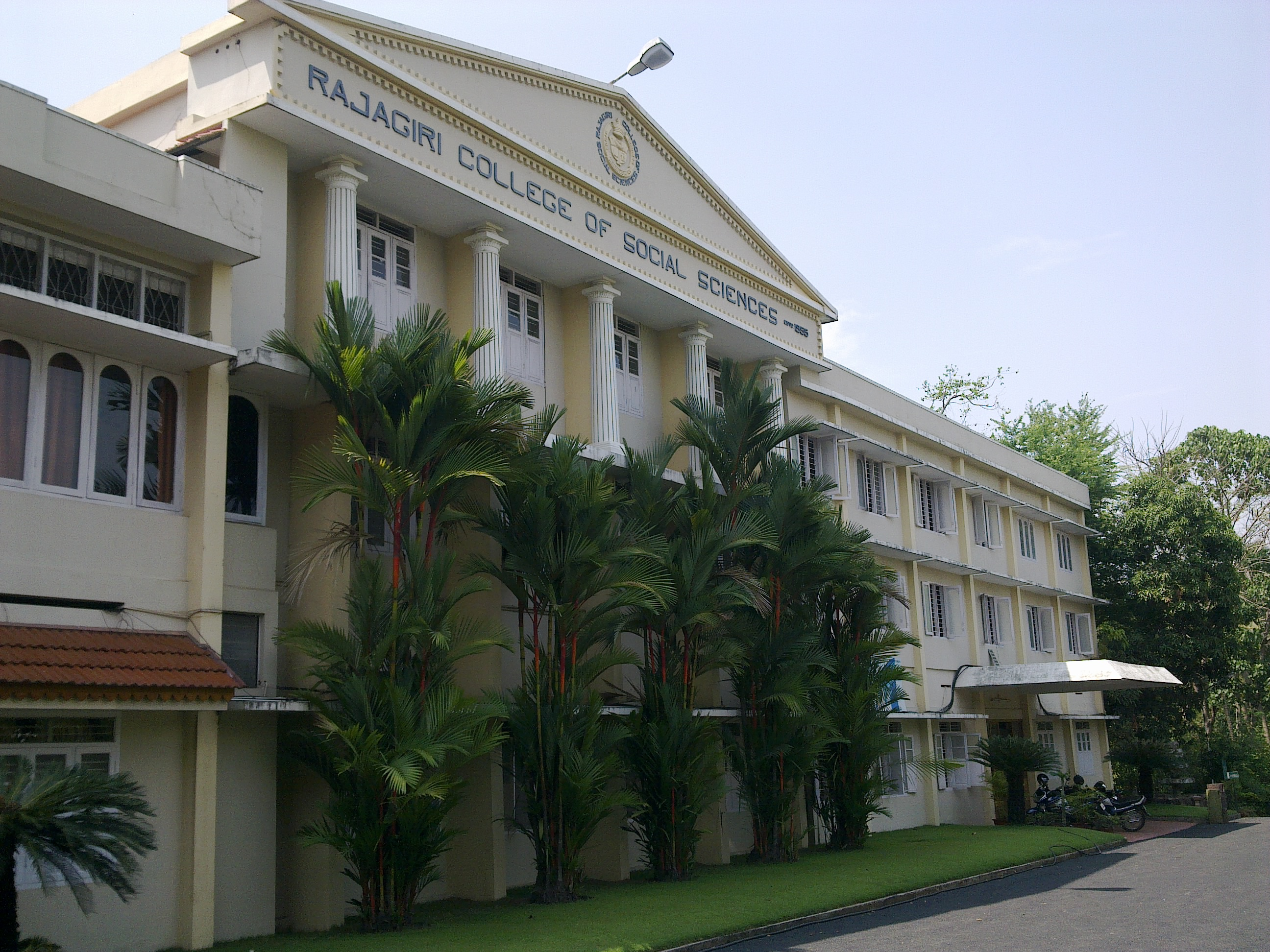
Rajagiri College of Social Sciences at Kalamassery

There 34 government schools, 67 private aided schools and 31 unaided schools affiliated to the Kerala State Education Board in the city and suburbs. There are 62 CBSE Schools, 2 IGCSE and 9 ICSE Schools as well.

The general pattern of education is ten years of common schooling to reach the secondary level. Kindegartens are widely available, but considered separate from formal schooling, and generally unregulated. After the secondary level, three streams, namely Arts, Commerce or Science are offered for higher secondary education. After finishing the school, students can opt for higher education related to the streams they had undergone for higher secondary schooling.

The notable schools in the government sector are Sree Rama Varma High School, Edappally High School, Government School-Kochi and Govt Girls Higher Secondary School in Kacheripady. There are Kendriya Vidyalaya, Chinmaya Mission and Bharatiya Vidya Bhavan run several quasi-private charter schools within the city limits, as well as in the suburbs. There are several fully private schools that are owned by secular and religious trusts which are of particular renown, such as Asoka World School, The Delta Study, Rajagiri Public School, Campion School, Assisi Vidyaniketan, Cochin Refineries School, Gregorian Public School, Greets Public School, Toc-H Public School, Global Public School, Choice School, Vidyodaya School, Mar Thoma Public School, Nava Nirman Public School and St. Pauls International School, Kalamassery, The Charter School Kochi.

== See also ==
- Ernakulam town
- Ernakulam district
- List of schools in Ernakulam district
