= SRVHS =

SRVHS may refer to:

- San Ramon Valley High School, Danville, California, USA.
- Sree Rama Varma High School, Kochi, Kerala, India.
- SRV Higher Secondary School, Rasipuram, Tamil Nadu, India.
