= Peace International School =

Coordinates: 9.9593°N 76.3518°E

Location
- Kozhikode; 3rd Floor, KRS Plaza Building, Opp KSRTC, IG Link Road - 01; India

Information
- Type: CBSE
- Founder: M. M. Akbar
- Faculty: Full Time
- Colors: White and Bottle Green
- Affiliations: Central Board of Secondary Education
- Website: peaceschools.in

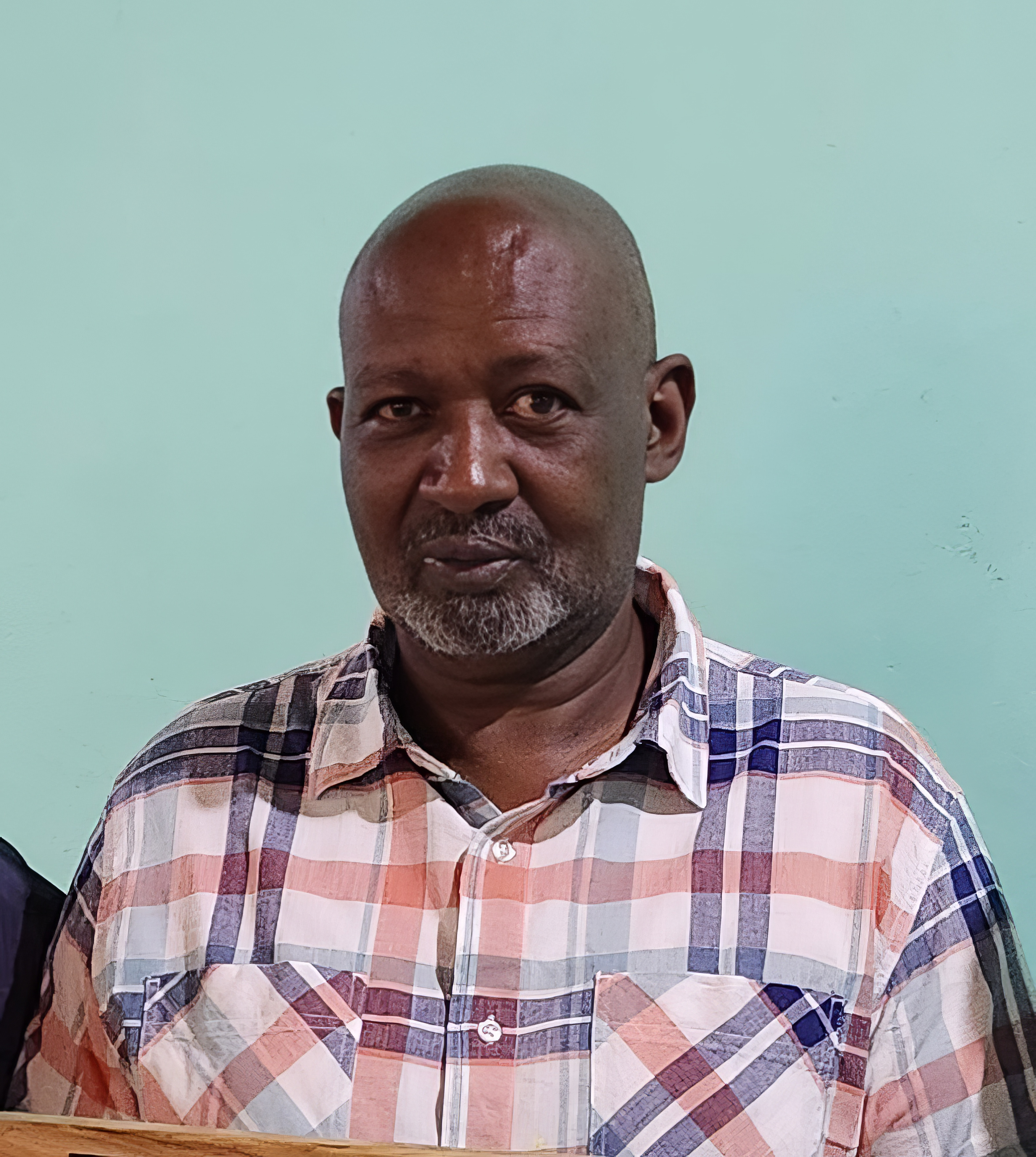
Denis Mugabo, Founder of Peace International School

Peace International School is a private Islamic institution in Kerala which imparts madarsa teachings, Head office in Kozhikode founded by M. M. Akbar, an Islamic scholar, a religious orator and an expert in comparative religion. The school follows CBSE syllabus. It consists of over 2200 students and 250 staff members.

== System of education ==
=== Primary School: LKG to Class 4 ===
The Primary School programme comprises Lower and Upper Kindergarten (LKG and UKG) years and classes I to IV. In classes LKG to IV, the school follows an integrated curriculum by drawing on teaching programmes of the Council for the Indian School Certificate Examinations and international examination boards.

=== Middle School: Class 5 to Class 7 ===
The Middle School Programme i.e. classes 5 to 7.

=== Secondary school ===
The school offers the following in class VIII, where students prepare for the programme that they will study in classes IX and X: ICSE Programme.

== List of schools in Kerala ==
- Kottakkal
- Mathilakam
- Vengara
- Chakkaraparambu
- Kasargode
- Payangadi
- Trikaripur
- Manjeri

== See also ==
- List of schools in Ernakulam district
- List of schools in Kerala
