= SRV school =

SRV school may refer to:

- SRV School, Namakkal, Tamil Nadu, India
- Sree Rama Varma High School, Kerala, India

== See also ==
- SR V Schools class, a class of steam locomotive, United Kingdom
