= Bhavan's Vidya Mandir, Girinagar =

Location
- Girinagar; Kochi, Kerala; India; 9.957919°N 76.300140°E

Information
- School type: Private recognized, Higher and Senior Secondary School (from Kindergarten)
- Motto: Aano Bhadrah Kratavo Yantu Vishwatah (Let Noble thoughts come to us from every side)
- Opened: 1977
- Founder: Dr. Kulapati M. Munshi
- Sister school: Bhavan's Vidya Mandir (Elamakkara); Bhavans Varuna Vidhyalaya (Thrikkakara); Bhavan's Adarsha Vidyalaya (Kakkanad); Bhavan's Vidya Mandir, Eroor; Bhavan's Munshi Vidyashram (Thiruvankulam)
- School board: CBSE
- Director: Sri. E Ramankutty
- Principal: Mrs. Sreejyothi N
- Staff: 113 (32 non-teaching staff)
- Teaching staff: 82
- Enrollment: 1800
- Language: English
- Campus size: 1.7 acres
- Houses: Ahimsa (Non-Violence); Dharmam (Virtue); Jnanam (Knowledge); Sathyam (Truth); Sevanam (Service); Shanthi (Peace); Thyagam (Sacrifice); Vinayam (Kind-Heartedness)
- Song: Bhavan's Anthem (Jai Jai Vidya)
- Publication: Bhavana, Toolika
- Affiliations: CBSE (Central Board of Secondary Education), India
- Website: www.bhavansgirinagar.ac.in

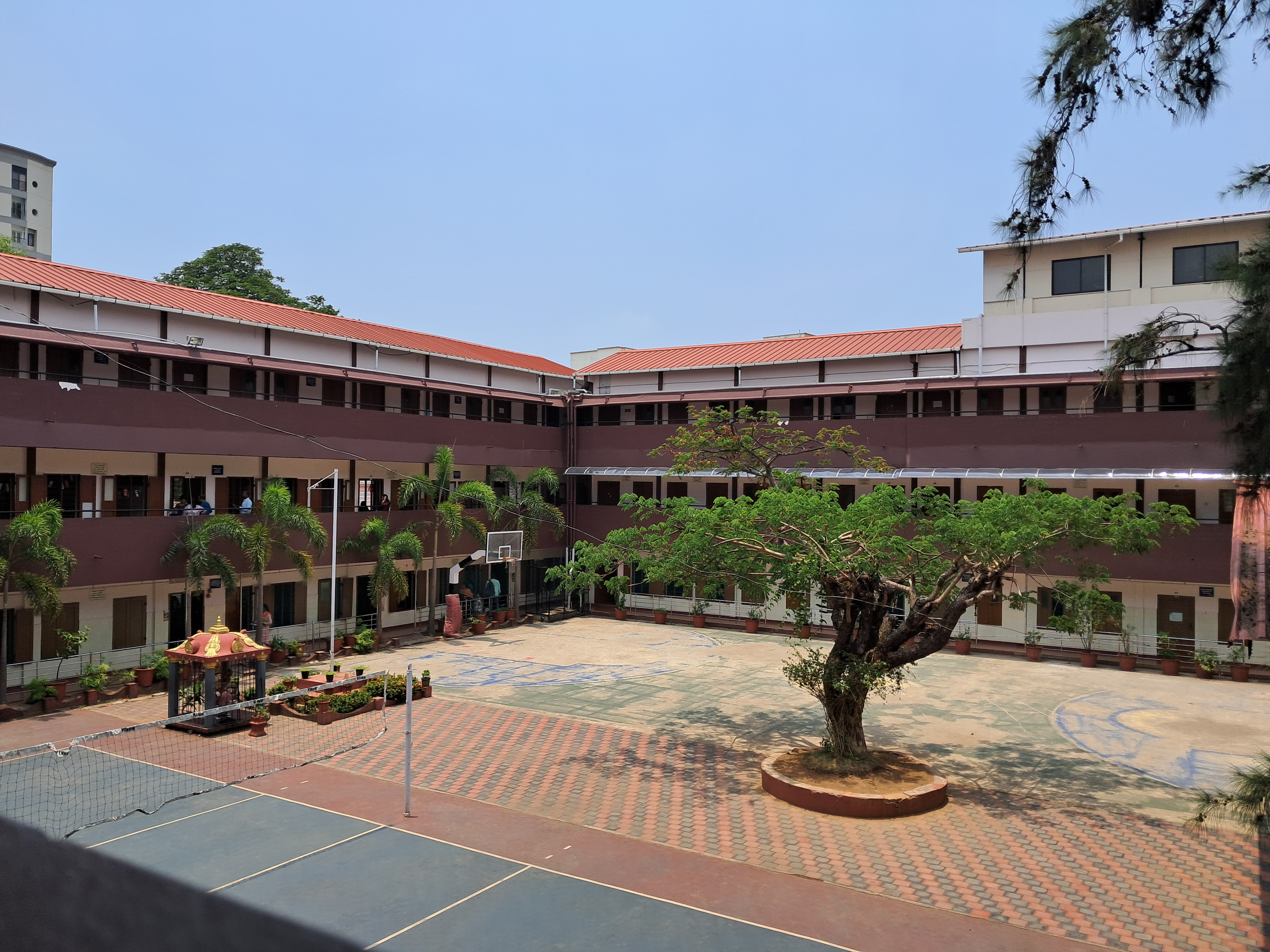
Main Block BVM Girinagar

Bhavan's Vidya Mandir, Girinagar (B.V.M. (G)) is a Senior Secondary School (Std. I–XII) affiliated to the Central Board of Secondary Education (CBSE), New Delhi. It is a part of the Bharatiya Vidya Bhavan, a group of educational institutions and is situated in Girinagar, Ernakulam (Kochi), Kerala, India.

== History ==
Bhavan's Vidya Mandir, Girinagar was founded in 1977 on 1.7 acres (6,900 m^{2}) of land donated by the Cochin Shipyard in the heart of Kochi City.

The school functions under the purview of the Kochi Kendra of Bharatiya Vidya Bhavan, which runs 7 schools in Kochi. Apart from the main subjects taught, the school also has basketball and National Cadet Corps (NCC) coaching after school timings, which generally runs on Mondays–Tuesdays 3:00–5:00 PM. The school got the Best School Award 2011 in India. The school has nearly 2000 students and 100 teachers.

== Timings ==
The school has three terms for Classes 1–5—first term is June–August, second term September–December, third term January–March.

For classes 6–10 it has two terms—first term June–Early October (starting 2012–13, May–September), second term Mid-October–March (starting 2012–13, October–March). The school opens at the beginning of June for Class I to VIII, XI and May for Classes IX–X and XII), and closes in March.

The summer vacation lasts from April beginning to May end for Class 1–8 and Class 11. For Class 9, 10, and 12, April alone is the month of vacation and May marks the beginning of their classes.

The school timing is from 8.30am to 3pm for classes 1 to 12 and functions from Monday to Friday.

== Academics ==
The school is open from Grade 1 to Grade 12 [1st standard to 12th standard] and the age group is from 6 years to 17 years. The school is divided into Primary [1–5], Secondary [6–10] and Senior Secondary [11–12] classes. Apart from the main subjects taught at school, the school also has basketball, volleyball, cricket and NCC coachings after school timings.

== Notable alumni ==
- Sriram Venkitaraman IAS bureaucrat, doctor
- Dijo Jose Antony, film director
- Divyaa Unni
- Vidhya Unni

== Facilities ==
- 51 classrooms equipped with Senses Boards
- Fully air-conditioned computer lab
- Junior science, Science and ATL labs
- Library
- Music, Dance, Tabla, Keyboard, Jazz, Yoga, Sports, NCC, karate, Drawing, Work Experience and Art and Craft room
- Air conditioned Audio-visual room
- Courts for cricket, football, basketball, tennis, badminton and martial arts
- Canteen Facility (provides Indian Lunch at afternoon for every student at a very low cost)
- Four Language Rooms
- Fully Air conditioned Auditorium
- Resource Room to aid students with learning disabilities

== An Add-On Facility: The "INTERACTIVE PANEL BOARD" ==
Intelligent Interactive Panels for classrooms.

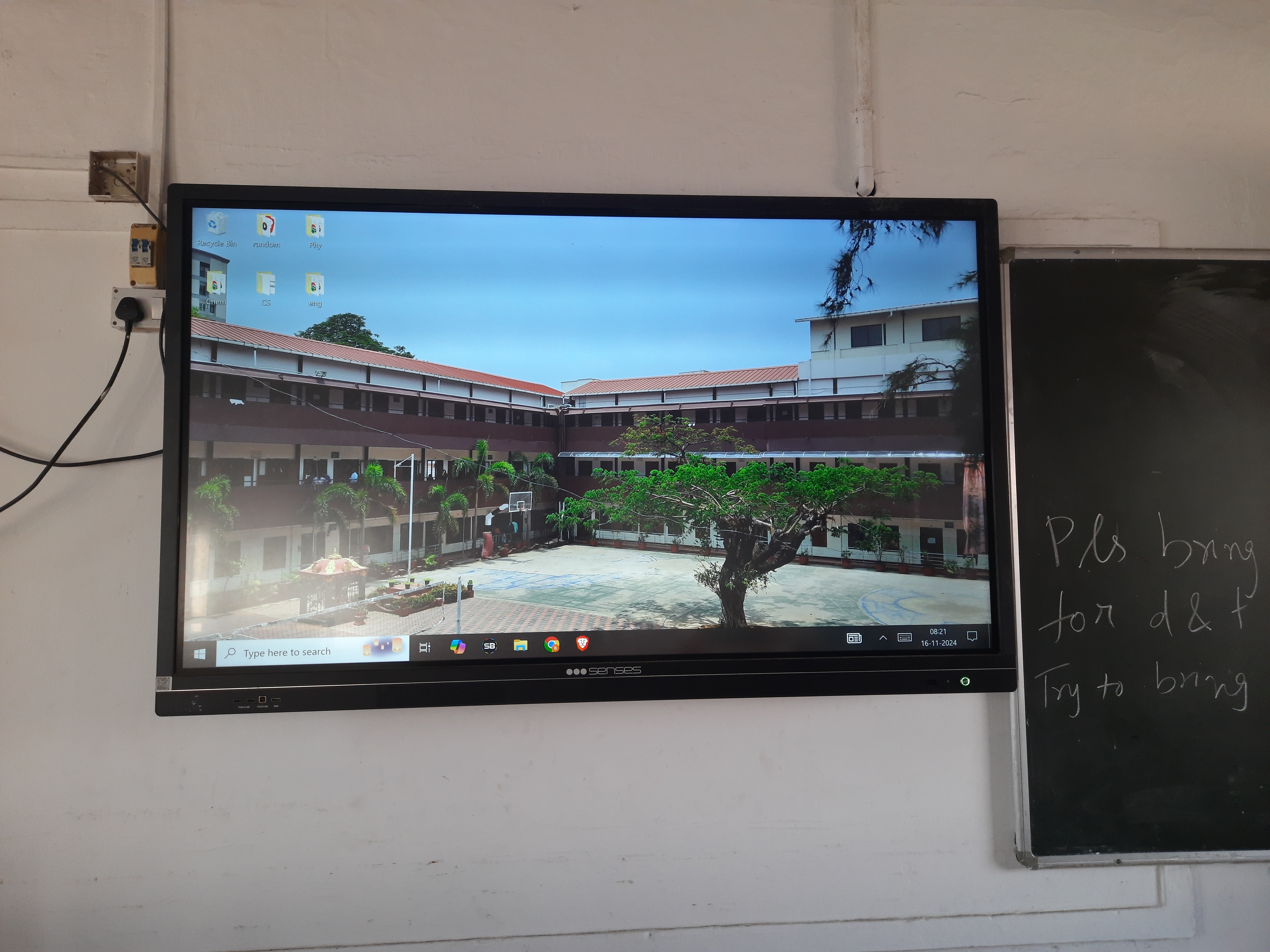
Interactive Panel

The school classrooms have now become digitalized. Following the return to offline classes after two years of online classes, the school introduced a 'senses board' for all classes from 1st to 12th grade. This new initiative enables visual stimulation and helps the students to understand complicated concepts into bite-sized ones that are easy to memorize. The board is now touchscreen and styluses have been introduced instead of chalk.

== Launching of the School Website ==
The school website was formally launched in June 2012. The website URL is: www.bhavansgirinagar.ac.in

== The PEACE Programme ==
The school has a yearly exchange programme called the PEACE (Programme for Educational and Cultural Exchange) with the students of The Judd School and Tunbridge Wells Girls' Grammar School, Kent, England. This is an exchange programme in which 28 students and five teachers are hosted by students and teachers of one of the member schools for approximately 3 weeks in an academic year; the next year, the students and teachers who hosted during the previous year travel to be hosted by those who visited them the prior year. This program was started in the year 1995 and has been very successful. The programme has been halted since the COVID-19 pandemic.

== Subjects and Periods ==
The school has eight periods of 40 minutes each in a day.

== Academics ==
=== All subjects and languages are to be studied compulsorily unless said below. ===
- For Class I–V, there are four, five or six main Subjects—Maths, General Science, Social Science (only for class 3rd–5th), English, Hindi (3rd Language, Compulsory) and Malayalam or Sanskrit (either of them—2nd language, from 2nd standard onwards). For Std.I, Malayalam language is compulsory.
- For Class VI–VIII, there are five or six main subjects—Maths, Science, (further divided into Physics, Chemistry and Biology), Social Science, English, Hindi and Malayalam or Sanskrit.
- For Class IX and X, everything is the same as Class VI–VIII except for Hindi becoming optional along with Sanskrit and Malayalam.

=== CLASS XI and XII ===
GROUP 1

- A: Bio-Mathematics—English, Physics, Chemistry, Biology, Mathematics.
- B: Computer-Maths—English, Computer Science (Practicals and Theory), Physics, Chemistry, Mathematics
- C: Bio-Info - English, Physics, Chemistry, Biology, Informatics Practices.

GROUP 2

- A: Commerce-Maths—Business Studies, Accountancy, Economics, Mathematics and English.
- B: Commerce-Info—English, Business Studies, Accountancy, Economics, Informatics Practices.

GROUP 3

- A: Humanities-Maths—History, Psychology, Economics, Mathematics and English.
- B: Humanities-Info—History, Psychology, Economics, Informatics Practices and English.

AI has also been provided as an additional skill subject, accessible to any group. Students can choose any one from these 5 sets.

== Co-Curricular Studies ==
Co-curricular studies have been given utmost importance in the school. The school promotes al types of extra-curricular activities through periods given especially for them. All students must study all these fields compulsorily, unless otherwise indicated. Most of these fields apply only to Students of Class I-VIII, but some of these apply to everyone (i.e. Class I to XII). They are indicated below.

- Computer Science Courses [both Theory and Practicals] (Std. III to X): Is compulsory for everyone to study. Can opt for the same in Classes XI and XII.
- Work Experience Classes (Std. I to X): Is compulsory for everyone to study. Teaches in Craft, Art, Glass Painting, and Model Making etc.
- Life Skills classes is compulsory for all classes from Std. I to Std. VIII.
- Art Education classes, also referred to as Art Training classes, are held for every class from I to XII, is compulsory. They teach Music (Indian and Western), Dance (Indian), Yoga (Exercises), Organ (Keyboard), Tabla, Mridangam, Drawing and Painting, Jazz (Drums). Students must compulsorily opt any ONE of these as their Art Education subject.
- Physical Training classes for football, cricket, basketball, volleyball, chess and table tennis are held for all classes and is NOT compulsory. Instead, students can opt for martial arts training classes (karate, judo, taekwondo).
- Library is a period for Std. I to XII when they are taken to the School Library and can read titles mainly on fiction, from the 1,00,000+ titles available.
- House Activity is a class held for VI to VIII, when the children are divided into houses Ahimsa (Non-Violence), Dharmam (Justice), Jnanam (Knowledge), Satyam (Truth), Sevanam (Service), Shanthi (Peace), Thyagam (Sacrifice), and Vinayam (Kindness). The period poses competitions and activities among each house, to find which house is top. It is a compulsory period.
- Club Activity is a class held for Classes VI-VIII, during which children are divided into clubs, namely: Science Club, Consumer Club, Social Service (or Sanskriti) Club, Integrity Club, Reading and Quiz Club, Health and Wellness Club etc. Students can opt for any one Club and this period is compulsory.
- GK / Culture Course classes are held for Std. I-VIII and is compulsory. A "Cultural Course" class is held along with this class which embarks Religious values into students.
- Work Education periods given below.

=== Work Education Initiative ===
Work Education course was embarked as a Co-Curricular, yet an assessed kind of activity in the school from the academic year 2011-2012 onward. Unlike the first year when it was introduced on a temporary basis, from the academic year 2012-2013 onward, specially trained staff for the job have been employed on a part-time basis in the school. This is a compulsory period for the students of Classes VI, VII, VIII, IX and X, the classes being for 2 hours (approx.) on the First, Third and Fifth Saturdays of a month. The course teaches the following subjects for students of these classes, out of which ANY ONE section mus be opted for the entire academic year, by the student.

- Food and Nutrition : Cookery classes, special know-how about nutrition classes etc., by Doctors and Diaticians.
- Art and Craft : Metal embossing, Glass painting, Nib painting, Pot painting, Tie and dye, Collage.
- Elements of Dress Designing : Tailoring, Stitching, Embroidery, Knitting.
- Creativity and Improvement : Making useful products out of waste products.
- Photography and Animation (Only for Class 9 and 10): Teaches modern Photography techniques, and 2-D Animation (Std. IX) and 3-D Animation (Std. X).
- Home Management : Interior designing and decorating, flower arrangement, beautician course, jewellery designing.
- Health Education : Sports and Games, Safety, First Aid, Traffic rules etc.

== Cultural Fests ==
- Magnum Opus is the school's annual cultural fest, held by XIth Graders. It is an inter-school contest involving competitions. It is conducted by the students of the XIth standard. The fest develops leadership skills of the students.
- The school has an Annual Day: and is usually conducted in January.
- A Sports Day is organized in November/December/January of every year.

== Awards and recognitions ==
- BVM Girinagar was declared International School Award 2010 by the British Council.
- Bharatiya Vidya Bhavan India won Best Teacher Award (2010), Best Student Award (2010, 2013 and 2014) and Best School Award (2011–2012).

== Heads of the school ==
=== Principals ===
- Smt. N.Vijayalakshmi, Principal (1980–2004)
- Smt. Nirmala Venkateshwaran, Principal (2004–2015)
- Smt. Sunitha, Principal (2015–2017)
- Smt. Girija TS, Principal [2018-2022]
- Smt. Kalyani NP, Principal [2022- 2023]
- Smt. Sreejyothi N, Principal [2023–Present]

=== Heads of the management ===
- CA Venugopal C Govind, FCA (Chairman)
- CA G Gopinathan (Vice-Chairman)
- Prof. Ambat Vijayakumar (Vice-Chairman)
- CA K Sankaranarayanan (HON.Secretary)
- CA K T Mohanan (HON.Treasurer)
- Shri. E Ramankutty (Director)

=== Office Bearers ===
- Senior Head Boy: A Senior Head Boy for the school (often called School Captain) is selected from among students of Std XII. Although a practice for the teachers to nominate a candidate whom they consider suitable for the post after consultation with the Principal and Vice Principal of the school, in 2012, the rule was changed to voting where students of Std XII voted under secret ballot to elect their Captain. However, this invited much criticism from teachers towards the end of the year, and nomination process continued until 2016; until the process of voting under secret ballot which was discontinued in the past, began again, this time from students of Class VI and upward.
- Senior Head Girl: Same as mentioned for Senior Head Boy.
- Junior Head Boy: A Junior Head Boy for the school (often abbreviated as Junior School Captain) is selected from among students of Std X. By practice, teachers of the school nominate a candidate whom they consider suitable for the post after consultation with the Principal and Vice Principal of the school.
- Junior Head Girl: Same as mentioned for Junior Head Boy.
- Sports Captain: Sports Captain is nominated by the Physical Education (PE) Department teachers after due discussions and deliberations among themselves, and also with the Principal and Vice Principal. The office-bearer is from Std XII.
- Games Captain: Same as mentioned for Sports Captain.

Besides, all Houses are headed by Captains (Class 10), Vice Captains (Class 9) and Prefects (Class 8).

== See also ==
- List of schools in Ernakulam
