= Shaji P. Chaly =

Indian judge

Retd. Justice Shaji P. Chaly

Judge Kerala High Court
- In office 10 April 2015 – 29 May 2023
- Nominated by: Rajendra Mal Lodha
- Appointed by: Pranab Mukherjee

Personal details
- Born: 29 May 1961 (age 65) Mulamthuruthy, Ernakulam
- Citizenship: Indian
- Education: Maharaja's College, Ernakulam
- Website: High Court of Kerala

Shaji Paul Chaly (born 29 May 1961) is a retired judge on the Kerala High Court, the highest court in the Indian state of Kerala and the Union Territory of Lakshadweep.

== Education and career ==
Chaly attended Sree Rama Varma High School, Ernakulam, then Maharaja's College, Ernakulam and finally obtained a law degree from Government Law College, Ernakulam. He enrolled as an advocate in 1986 and started practice at Ernakulam. On 10 April 2015, he was appointed as an additional judge of the Kerala High Court. He became a permanent member of the court on 5 April 2017. Justice Chaly demitted his office upon attaining the age of superannuation on 29 May 2023.
