= Kendriya Vidyalaya, Ernakulam =

Central Govt school in Ernakulam, India

Kendriya Vidyalaya Ernakulam

Location
- Kadavanthra; Ernakulam 682020; India; 9.9712°N 76.2966°E

Information
- Other name: KVE
- School type: Central Government
- Motto: Tattvaṃ Pūṣanapāvṛṇu; Sanskrit: तत्त्वं पूषनपावृणु
- Established: 1965
- School board: Central Board of Secondary Education (CBSE)
- Authority: Ministry of Education, Government of India
- Campus type: Urban
- Houses: Ashoka; Raman; Shivaji; Tagore
- Slogan: "Vidya Sarvatra Shobhate"
- Song: "Bharat Ka Svarnim Gaurav Kendriya Vidyalaya Layega"
- Website: ernakulam.kvs.ac.in

Kendriya Vidyalaya Ernakulam is a school in Gandhi Nagar, Kadavanthra, Kochi in the state of Kerala, India. It is one of the Kendriya Vidyalaya Sangathan schools — which is a part of the system of central government schools under the Ministry of Human Resource Development of India.

== History ==
The school was established in May 1965. It functioned in a single-storey building that previously housed a police station, near the Cochin Shipyard. Later, it moved to the Chakola Mansion on Old Thevara Road at Perumanoor. The school initially admitted students of classes six to nine. In 1966, classes one to five and the tenth standard were introduced.

In 1970, it shifted to its current campus at Gandhinagar, which is spread over 7.5 acres. Its old building block was constructed in 1970, in the traditional architectural style of Kerala.

As of 2025, there are 2162 students — 1106 boys, 1056 girls and 100 staffs - including teachers and office staff. The school buildings are divided into two blocks, the original building and the new block which was inaugurated in July 2009.

== School organisation ==
The school has up to 12 grades with four sections: A, B, C and D. Apart from the formal classes, the students take part in co-curricular activities, sports and games, club activities, work experience, Scouts and Girl Guides, computer education, vocational training and adventure programmes.

The students have been divided into four groups or houses: Lakshmibai, Kasturba, Vijayalakshmi and Savitribai. The co-curricular activities are conducted along house lines. At the end of the academic year, the house with the most points is declared the winner. The trophy is awarded to the captains of the house by the chief guest at the Annual Day Celebrations.

== Events ==
In December 2015, the school marked its 50th anniversary with golden jubilee celebrations. In December 2023, the school authorities announced plans to demolish the old block as part of a redevelopment initiative. The Ernakulam Alumni Association organised a reunion titled These Bricks and Beyond on the school premises before the old building was being demolished.

In August 2025, the Ernakulam District Disaster Management Authority ordered the demolition of the school's original building, owing to its deteriorating condition.

In December 2025, the school marked its 60th anniversary with diamond jubilee celebrations. The programme honoured the teachers who had served during 1965–1970. The programme also exhibited photographs documenting the schools's history.

== See also ==
- List of schools in Ernakulam
- Kendriya Vidyalaya No. 2 AFA, Dundigal
- List of Kendriya Vidyalayas
