= Bhavan's Adarsha Vidyalaya =

- Chittethukara; Kakkanad; Kochi, Kerala; India

Information
- School type: Private recognized, Higher and Senior Secondary School (from Kindergarten)
- Motto: Aano Bhadrah Kratavo Yantu Vishwatah (Let Noble thoughts come to us from every side - Rigveda, 1-89-i)
- Founded: 1989
- Founder: R. Vasudevan Pillai, K.M. Munshi
- School board: CBSE
- Director: Sri. E Ramankutty
- Principal: Sri. K.Suresh
- Grades: 1 - 12
- Enrollment: >100000
- Language: english
- Campus size: 10 acres
- Houses: Ahimsa (Non-Violence); Dharmam (Virtue); Jnanam (Knowledge); Sathyam (Truth); Sevanam (Service); Shanthi (Peace); Thyagam (Sacrifice); Vinayam (humility)
- Song: Bhavan's Anthem (Jai Jai Vidya)
- Publication: Darpan, Akshara
- Affiliations: CBSE

Bhavan's Adarsha Vidyalaya, one of the six schools of the Bharatiya Vidya Bhavan, Kochi Kendra is a senior secondary school affiliated to the Central Board of Secondary Education. The school is situated at Kakkanad, Kochi, India.

== History ==
The school was founded by R. Vasudevan Pillai and Santhi Balagopalan, and was inaugurated on 2 July 1989 by His Highness Marthanda Varma Illaya Raja of Travancore. Upon inception, the school only had classes up to 3rd Grade, but now has classes from Kindergarten to Grade XII with a student strength of over 2000. The school is now one of the best schools in Kerala excelling in various cultural events, quizzes, sports events and many more.

== Present ==
The school is headed by principal, Smt Kalyani N P and vice principal, Smt. Jyothi P.

The school is part of Bharatiya Vidya Bhavan which has six other schools in Kochi, which include: Bhavan's Vidya Mandir (Girinagar), Bhavans Vidya Mandir (Elamakkara), Bhavan's Vidya Mandir (Eroor), Bhavan's Varuna Vidyalaya, Bhavan's Munshi Vidyashram and Bhavan's Newsprint Vidyalaya.

The school's current student council for 2024-25 includes:

Vishal SJ- Senior Head Boy

Anaswara Ramesh - Senior Head Girl

Leo D Felix - Senior Sports Captain

Aushin Krishna - Junior Head Boy

Durga Premjith - Junior Head Girl

The school has over 2000 students from classes 1 to 12 who are being educated by a staff of over 100.

== House activity ==
There are eight houses into which the students from all classes are divided. These houses are named after moral values from ancient Indian Texts.

- Ahimsa (Non-Violence)
- Dharma (Justice)
- Jnanam (Knowledge)
- Sathyam (Truth)
- Sevanam (Service)
- Shanthi (Peace)
- Thyagam (Sacrifice)
- Vinayam (Humility)

== Clubs & Other activities ==
The school is well known in and around the city for the various activities it conducts. The school also has eight clubs, which hold various intra-school activities throughout the year. The clubs are as follows

- Science Club
- Integrity Club - Established with the help of Bharat Petroleum.
- Social Service Club
- Quiz Club
- Maths Club
- Reading Club
- Interact Club
- Health and Wellness Club

== Activities and contributions to students ==
The school hosts an annual Inter- school Football Tournament called 'Adarsha Cup' during the months of August and September. Schools in and around Kochi take part in this tournament. Bhavans also organises the Bhavans fest(cultural event) around November which gives a platform to many talented children . From 2015, the school has started hosting Labyrinth-Bitwiz, a cultural and technology fest for the schools in Kochi. It celebrated its 10th edition in 2025, with many well-known personalities gracing the occasion.

== School magazine ==
The School publishes an annual magazine entitled 'Darpan'. This Magazine is given to every student and contains the achievements of the school in the year, and also acts as a medium for young writers and poets to publish their stories and poems in Malayalam, Sanskrit, English and Hindi.

== See also ==
- List of schools in Ernakulam
- Bharatiya Vidya Bhavan
- Bhavan's Vidya Mandir, Girinagar
- Bhavans Varuna Vidhyalaya
