= Bhavan's Varuna Vidyalaya =

Location
- Thrikkakara, Kochi, Kerala; India; 10.0227°N 76.3351°E

Information
- Type: Private
- Motto: Let Noble thoughts come to us from every side
- Established: 1992
- Principal: Remadevi K P

Bhavan's Varuna Vidyalaya is a senior secondary school situated at Thrikkakara, in the city of Kochi, India. The school is a joint venture of the Bharatiya Vidya Bhavan and Naval Physical and Oceanographic Laboratory (NPOL). It is affiliated with the Central Board of Secondary Education.

== History ==
The school was started in 1992 to cater to children of NPOL employees. The school started with 114 students and 10 staff.

== Today ==
The school has six other schools in Kochi, which include: Bhavan's Girinagar, Bhavan's Vidya Mandir - Elamakkara, Bhavan's Vidya Mandir - Eroor, Bhavan's Adarsha Vidyalaya, Bhavan's Munshi Vidyashram and Bhavan's Newsprint Vidyalaya.

The school has over 1000 students from classes 1 to 12 who are taught by a teaching staff of over 70. Extracurricular activities are offered in arts, sports and music.

The motto is the same as that of Bharatiya Vidya Bhavan: "Let noble thoughts come to us from every side".

== Activities ==
The school hosted an annual cultural event called "Insignia" conducted by all the 11th graders of the year. Insignia events include Vinquizzitive (Quiz) and Versetality (Poetry Recitation). This was discontinued beginning in the academic year of 2017–18.

The school hosts an annual interschool Science meet "Vigyanotsav". The competitions include science exhibitions, quizzes, and model-making. Varuna also conducts the Varuna Cup volleyball tournament and the Varuna Cup chess tournament. In 2011, Varuna became the host school for "South Zone Bhavan's Youth Festival" and "14th all Kerala CBSE (Cluster VI) Volleyball tournament". Other activities include the SEED programme under "Mathrubhumi" which aims at environmental conservation.

== See also ==
- List of schools in Ernakulam
