= M. M. Akbar =

Indian Islamic scholar

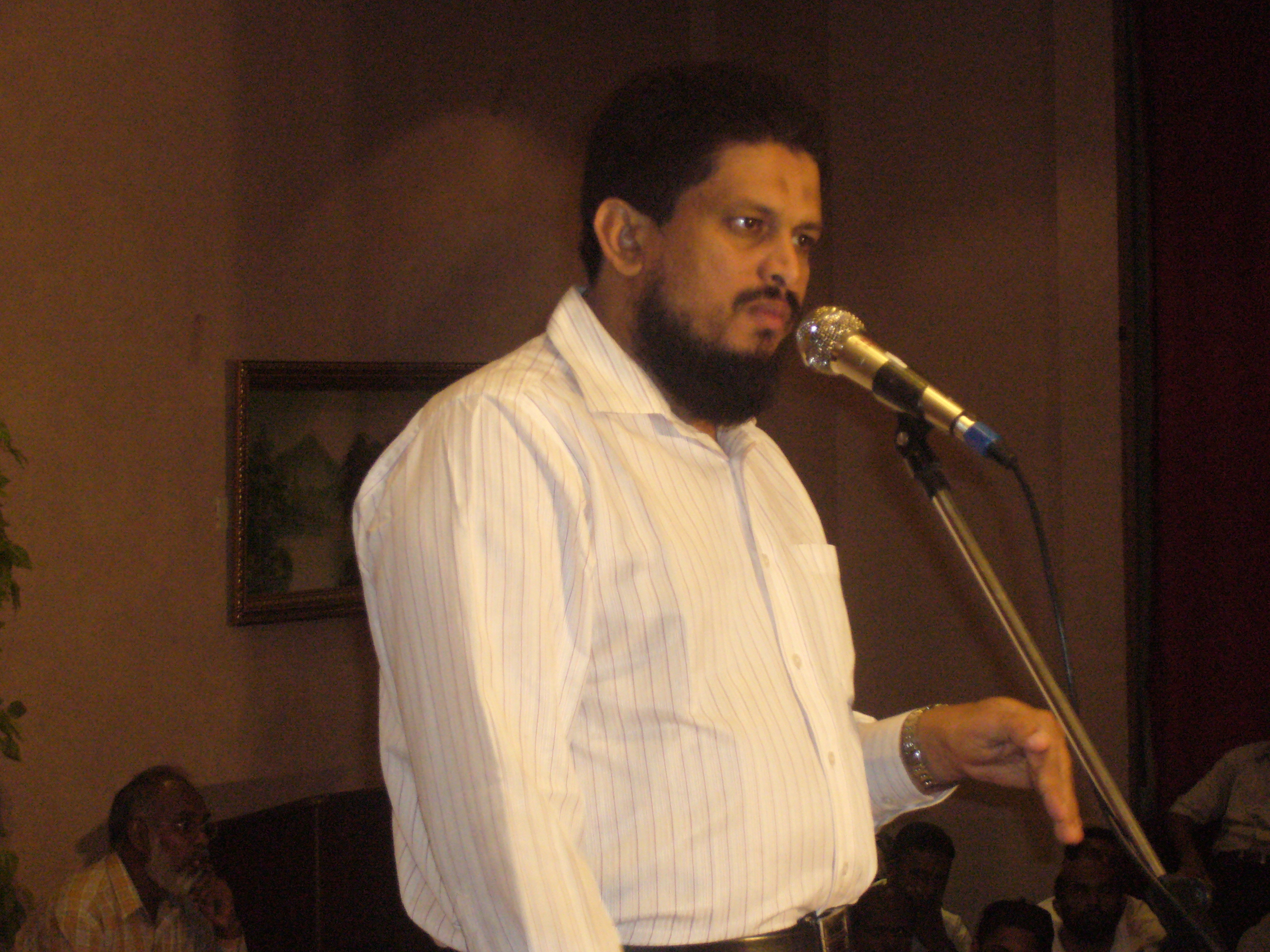
- Akbar in 2009
- Born: February 3, 1966 (age 60); Parappanangadi, Malappuram, Kerala, India.
- Occupations: Chairman and managing director of Peace International School; Preacher, author

Meleveettil Muhammad Akbar (Malayalam: മേലേവീട്ടില്‍ മുഹമ്മദ് അക്ബര്‍) is an Islamic preacher and religious scholar from India. He is the managing director of Peace International School. Akbar used to be a school teacher in Malappuram, teaching physics, and was associated with the Mujahid Student Movement. Director of Niche of Truth, an Islamic dawa organization based in Kerala and the editor of Sneha Samvadam magazine published from Kochi, Kerala, India. Niche of Truth has created the first website in Malayalam, about the life of the Islamic prophet, Muhammad. The Cochin-based Islamic dawa organization's objective is to present Islam as a comprehensive religion in front of India's pluralist society.

== Early life ==
MM Akbar was born in 1968 Parappanangadi, Malappuram, Kerala, India.. He was educated by his parents, who were known for religious scholarship.

== Career ==
He is renowned orator and comparative religion scholar, has been serving as director of Niche of Truth since 1992. The Cochin-based Islamic missionary organization's objective is to present Islam as a comprehensive religion in front of India's pluralist society. He also heads Peace Education Foundation, which runs 14 schools, of which one is in Jeddah. These schools focus on imparting excellent secular education in an Islamic environment and upholding Islamic identity, in addition to developing leadership qualities.

=== Chief Editor of Sneha Samvadam magazine ===
MM Akbar, who is the Chief Editor of Sneha Samvadam magazine, a monthly periodical started in 2002, which handles creative and productive articles on comparative religion, science and Islam

=== Managing director of Peace International School ===
MM Akbar, who is the managing director of Peace International School, a chain of 13 schools run by the Peace Foundation.

== Literary style and themes ==
In 2001 he commenced an Islamic book publishing firm 'Dawa Books' which has already released 150+ titles

== International Recognition ==
Akbar has been invited to speak at various international conferences and events, including:

- Multiple invitations from Islamic Affairs departments in the UAE, Saudi Arabia, Qatar, Kuwait, and Bahrain
- Guest speaker for the International Holy Qur’an Recitation Competition in Dubai
- Lectures in Australia and the United Kingdom

In 2004 and 2009, Akbar was invited by the rulers of the UAE to give lectures during Ramadan. He has also had the opportunity to meet with various Emirati rulers, including Mohammed bin Rashid Al Maktoum.

== Other Initiatives ==
- Founder and Director of NICHE OF TRUTH, an Islamic organization in Cochin, Kerala
- Publisher and Chief Editor of Sneha Samvadam, a Malayalam magazine
- Managing Director of Da’wa Books, a publishing firm
- Convenor of the Programme Committee for the First Dubai International Peace Convention in 2010
- Designer and organizer of the Salvation International Exhibition on Islam in Kerala and Dubai

Through his various roles and initiatives, M.M. Akbar continues to work towards promoting education, interfaith understanding, and religious tolerance in India and internationally.

== Controversies ==
In January 2018, The Kerala government ordered closure of the Peace schools and issued a look out notice for Akbar. Kochi police arrested him on 25 February 2018.

In July 2016, Promoting communal division: He is the managing director of Peace International School, a chain of 13 schools run by the Peace Foundation. The chain came under controversy as it was found to be promoting communal division through its syllabus

In March 2018, MM Akbar has been granted bail by the court and currently all the peace schools are functioning normally. No material promoting communal division was found in the school syllabus by the High Court.

In February 2018, Kochi police to quiz for International extremist links: he had links with international extremist outfits.
