= Vidyodaya School =

Location
- Thevakkal, Ernakulam; India; 10.0487°N 76.3669°E

Information
- Type: Private school
- Motto: "Service and Commitment "
- Founded: 1991
- Founder: Vidyodaya Educational and Charitable Trust
- School district: Ernakulam
- President: Dr.Sreekumar
- Principal: Geetha Rajeev
- Head of school: Principal
- Faculty: 136
- Grades: LP to +2
- Enrollment: 2489
- Colors: Maroon and black
- Athletics: Kabaddi, hockey, judo, football, wrestling
- Athletics conference: CBSE National Championships
- Affiliation: CBSE
- Alumni: Vidyodayan Old Students Association
- Website: www.vidyodayaschool.ac.in

Vidyodaya School is a private college-preparatory combined-grades school located in Thevakkal, Kochi, India. It provides comprehensive school education from lower primary to grade 12.

== About ==
Established in 1990-91, the school conducts classes from LKG to Grade 12. The 12- acre campus, situated on a hillock, comprises the Nursery block and the Primary, Secondary, and Science blocks. The school has 2057 students.

The campus has science, mathematics and computer labs, and a conference hall. The Administrative block accommodates a library, reading room, and canteen. Other infrastructural facilities include the Sports Complex, with facilities for basketball, volleyball and football. The school operates 15 buses that transport students and staff across the city and suburbs.

== Academics ==
Vidyodaya School follows the CBSE Scheme. The medium of instruction is English. Hindi or Malayalam is introduced as the second language from first grade, and Malayalam or Sanskrit is introduced as the third language from third grade. At the Senior Secondary stage, there are three groups: Science, Commerce and Humanities. English is a compulsory subject in all three groups. Classes VI to X follow NCERT text books in major subjects. Until tenth standard, students study a range of subjects, including science, languages, mathematics, social sciences, yoga, physical education, and art and crafts, after which they can choose their preferred specializations.

=== Curriculum ===
The school's academic program is based on the Central Board of Secondary Education (CBSE), New Delhi, and the text books are as prescribed by the National Council of Educational Research and Training (NCERT).

=== Sports and cultural activities ===
In extra-curricular activities, students have won competitions at district, state and national level. The judo and wrestling teams have won several national championships.

Every year, the school hosts Vox (The Voice), an inter-school cultural competition, usually with value- based themes.

==== Dramatics ====
The School Dramatics Club has conducted programs such as Thattakam Tree Weekly Drama and the Annual Dramatics Show. The Dramatics club regularly showcases dramas and plays both inside and outside the school.

=== Nursery Block ===
The Nursery Block, containing the Kindergarten, is situated at the bottom of the hillock, near the campus entrance. It is in a figurative art-deco architectural style. The building is shaped like a train station, with a train on one side, and the surrounding garden and park complement the theme with references to public transportation, such as models of traffic lights and buses. The building includes a swimming pool, an activities stage, and classrooms. Its walls feature murals.

=== Primary and Secondary Section ===
The Primary and Secondary Section has multiple blocks spread over the campus. The class strength is restricted to a maximum of 30 students and there are 5 divisions in each grade.

=== Senior Secondary Block ===
The Senior Secondary Block, also called the Science Block because the science laboratories are located there, is situated on the north-west side of the hillock. Features in and around the building also allude to this name, such as a giant turtle- shaped pool, dinosaurs painted on the walls, and a model science park. Grades 11-12 are located here.

=== Additional Facilities ===
There are Chemistry, Physics, Biology, Computer Science and Mathematics Laboratories spread throughout the campus. Other facilities include SMART Classes(Virtual Classrooms), ATL (Atal Tinkering Lab), multiple conference halls, and open-air classrooms.

== Student activities ==
Student activities include a Student Government framework, Student Houses, clubs, groups, and events. Activities include flower making, paper craft, clay modelling, tie and dye work, metal work, scientific awareness, and nutrition.

Cultural celebrations include Onam, Christmas, Ramayana month, Navrathri, and Ramzan.

The school observes World Environment Day, Constitution Day, Human Rights Day, and Science Day to promote social awareness among students. Community singing, skits, and plays are used to promote patriotism and respect for India's traditional values. The school also holds Arts and Crafts, Science, and other exhibitions. Programs are also held to improve awareness of energy conservation and water consumption.

=== School Parliamentary Forum ===
School Parliamentary Forum is the name of the Vidyodaya School Student Government. Modeled on the Indian Parliament, the Forum consists of students selected from each class, who are divided into different circles for different activities. Each circle is headed by a Minister, who reports to the Speaker or Deputy Speaker, both of whom are elected by the Forum.

The Forum Secretary, who is also elected, records the proceedings. The Forum is headed by the Head Boys and Head Girls, who are directly elected by the students in an annual election in July. House Captains are members of the Forum with the same status as the Speaker.

=== Houses ===
Students are divided into four houses: Ezhuthachan, Kabir, Tagore and Valmiki, each with its own colors and teams. The houses compete for points in inter-house competitions held throughout the year, and the House Cup is awarded to the house with the most points. These competitions, in craft, painting, dance and music, literary and histrionic skills, and sports and games, are intended to inculcate a competitive spirit among the students.

=== Clubs ===
The school offers a variety of clubs, including the Quiz Club, Sports/Agriculture Club and Dramatics Club. Other clubs include Literary, Art and Craft, Maths, Science and Space. Time is allocated for club activities, and each club is mentored by teachers.

==== Y! ====
There is a school chapter of the CII Promoted Young Indians, which functions as a club. The club seeks to develop leadership qualities among the students.

==== Junior Red Cross ====
A chapter of the Junior Red Cross functions in the school. Members wear white clothing with red stripes every Wednesday. The club seeks to promote first aid education among the students.

==== Shanti Samithi ====
The Shanti Samithi, a social service club, seeks to promote the values of Gandhism, peace and nonviolence among the students. It holds annual activities and conducts programs to help the poor in the surrounding areas.

=== Events ===
==== Sarganjali ====
Sarganjali is a programme organised by the students, in which each division performs a drama, a song, a dance and a special programme, all within 20 minutes.[The program is conducted every year by the students of each class under 9th grade, with the grade below being their audience.

==== Vox Populi ====
Vox Populi (Latin for Voice of the People) is an inter-school competition organised by senior students, giving them an opportunity to develop their organizing skills. The competition attracts companies and students from across the city.

==== Inter-School Camp ====
The Vidyodaya Inter-School Camp is a three- day camp hosted by the school, to which schools from around the country are invited to send students. The camp is exclusively for students of 8th grade and includes activities such as outdoor games, cooking competitions, literary events, adventure sports, art and craft competitions, live performances, campfires and DJ nights. The event is organized by students of 11th grade, giving them experience in managing a large- scale event.

==== Arangu ====
Arangu, held at the close of the academic year, is a display of fine arts and martial arts by the students of grades 1 to 5.

==== Sports Day ====
Every year, the school holds a day-long sports celebration, beginning with a march past, oath taking, aerobics and a martial arts display, followed by an intra-school athletics competition for students. An athletics competition is also held for teaching and non-teaching staff.

==== Shastra Samasya ====
In connection with the National Science Day, the school introduced an annual Science Quiz open to all city schools, intended to encourage scientific talent in children. The C V Raman Memorial Ever Rolling Trophy is awarded to the winning team.

==== SPICE ====
Social Participation In Child Education is a supplementary learning program, run since 1995, in which students interact with notable people from various fields.

==== Other programs ====
An orientation program is held at the beginning of each year. The FIT (Faculty Improvement Training) program is intended to improve the teaching and learning process at the school.

=== School traditions ===
One school tradition is for the class divisions of the upper high school to adopt nicknames as identifiers as part of freshman bonding.

== See also ==
- List of schools in Ernakulam
- Kochi
- Central Board of Secondary Education
