= SCMS Cochin School of Business =

Business school in Kochi, India

- Type: Private
- Established: 1976
- Chairman: G. P. C. Nayar
- Director: Radha Thevannoor
- Location: Aluva, Kochi, Kerala, India; 10.0671361°N 76.3244106°E
- Website: www.scms.edu.in

SCMS Cochin School of Business, formerly School of Communication and Management Studies, is a management institute located at Kochi, India. The institute is located about 12 km (7.5 mi) from Ernakulam railway station. The school was established in 1976 by G. P. C. Nayar, under the trust Prathap Foundation for Education and Training. It is part of the SCMS Group of educational institutions. SCMS Post Graduate Diploma in Management (PGDM) is very famous in south India. It is rated as the best business school in Kerala after IIM-K for many years. The school provides PGDM with electives in marketing, finance, retail, human resources, banking and insurance, and system and operations.

SCMS is accredited by the Accreditation Council for Business Schools and Programs and by the National Board of Accreditation since 2003.

SCMS Journal of Indian Management
- Discipline: Business, Management, Accounting
- Language: English
- Edited by: G.P.C. Nayar

Publication details
- History: 2004–present
- Publisher: School of Communication and Management Studies (India)
- Frequency: Quarterly
- Open access: Yes

Standard abbreviations
- ISO 4: SCMS J. Indian Manag.

Indexing
- ISSN: 0973-3167
- OCLC no.: 848237673

Links
- Journal homepage; Online archive

== Publications ==
Since 2004, the school publishes a quarterly peer-reviewed academic journal, the SCMS Journal of Indian Management, focused on business, management, and accountancy. The editor-in-chief is G.P.C. Nayar, SCMS Group's founder and chairman. The journal is abstracted and indexed in Scopus and EBSCO and ProQuest databases.

== Leadership ==
The founder and chairman of the SCMS Group is G. P. C. Nayar, an entrepreneur and president of the Federation of Private Self Financing Professional Institutions in India for many years.
