= Xavier Institute of Management and Entrepreneurship =

Private business school in India

Xavier Institute of Management and Entrepreneurship, Bangalore
- Type: Private business school
- Established: 1991
- Chairman: Prof. J Philip
- President: Mr. Anil J Philip
- Director: Dr.Roshni James
- Location: Bengaluru, Kochi, and Chennai, India; 12.848°N 77.675°E
- Campus: Urban
- Website: www.xime.org

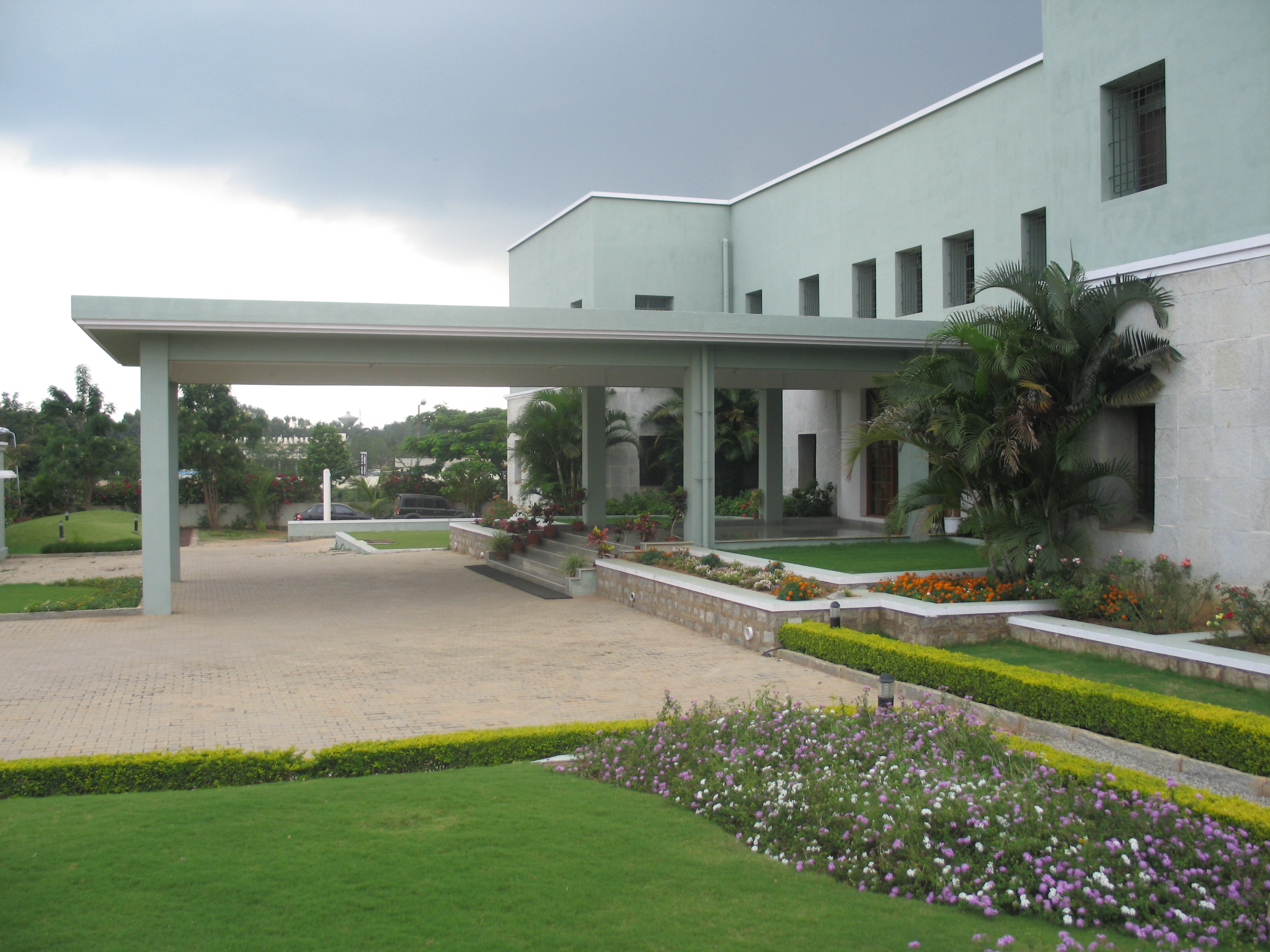
XIME Bangalore front view

Xavier Institute of Management and Entrepreneurship (XIME) is a private business school with three fully residential campuses, in Bengaluru, Kochi and Chennai, all in India. XIME is currently being led by Anil J Philip as the President. The Institute pioneered the Association of BRICS Business Schools (ABBS, estd 2008) which is a platform for management education in Brazil, Russia, India, China and South Africa.

XIME arranges international events in collaboration with seventeen partner institutions around the globe which is popularly known as Student Exchange Programme, including campus exchange programmes, faculty exchange programmes and an international study tour for its students. XIME took the initiative in formation of Association of BRICS Business Schools (ABBS), thus bringing together Brazil, Russia, India, China and South Africa. XIME offers a two-year PGDM course with specialization in Marketing, Finance, HR, Operations and Business Analytics. XIME Bengaluru also offers PGCM in Construction Management and Healthcare Management.

== Ranking ==
Ranked 45th best in South India by Outlook-ICARE India MBA Rankings 2020
