= The Choice School =

Private school in India

Coordinates: 9.9593°N 76.3518°E

Information
- Established: 1991; 35 years ago
- Staff: c.250
- Enrollment: c.2200

The Choice School is a private school in Kerala, India, built in 1991. It is owned by The Choice Group under the leadership of Jose Thomas Olassa. The school follows the CBSE syllabus. It consists of over 2200 students and 250 staff members. The school is attended by both day scholars as well as boarding school students.

== Principals ==
- Mrs. Lakshmi Ramachandran (1991-1999), Mentor of Global Public School
- Mrs. Laila Thomas (1999-2000)
- Mrs. Molly Cyril (2000-2013)
- Mrs. Sunitha Satheesh (2013-2020)
- Mr. Jacob P. Ajith Mathews (2020-2022)
- Mrs. Rachel Ignatius (2023 - )

== Notable alumni ==
- Kalidas Jayaram, Actor

== See also ==
- List of schools in Ernakulam district
