= List of schools in Ernakulam district =

Schools in Ernakulam district, Kerala, India

Ernakulam district in the state of Kerala, India has schools affiliated to the International Baccalaureate (IB), Pearson Education Limited (formerly, Edexcel), the Council for the Indian School Certificate Examinations (CISCE), the Central Board of Secondary Education (CBSE), the National Institute of Open Schooling (NIOS) and the Kerala Board of Public Examinations. Eranakulam District has the most number of schools in Kerala after Trivandrum District followed three based on the ownership and operational control. Government schools are owned and run by organizations or individuals, but the operations are controlled by the government. Private unaided schools have government control only in academics. The schools are divided into four ed Aluva, Ernakulam, Kothamangalam and Muvattupuzha, each under a District Educational Officer. The district has a total of 88 government schools, 178 privately aided schools and 57 unaided schools. The urban area of Kochi has 34 government schools, 67 private aided schools and 31 unaided schools.

The schools offering the curriculum prepared by CISCE and CBSE follow the syllabi of the respective national organizations. The medium of instruction is English in such schools. There are 128 CBSE schools and 25 CISCE schools in the district. The Kochi urban area has 117 CBSE Schools and 9 CISCE Schools. The Indian Public School (TIPS). Dawn International School and German Metropolitan International School both offer the curricula prepared by Pearson Education Limited (formerly Edexcel) for the IGCSE and GCE ‘A’ level qualifications.

== Schools affiliated to the Kerala Board of Public Examinations ==
=== Aluva Educational District ===
==== Government Schools ====
Sl No	School	Location
1	Aluva Govt. HSS for Girls	Aluva
2	Ambalamugal Govt. VHSS	Ambalamugal
3	Binanipuram Govt. HS	Binanipuram
4	Chendamangalam Govt. HSS	Chendamangalam
5	Chengamanad Govt. HSS	Chengamanad
6	Chowara Govt. HSS	Chowara
7	Edathala Govt. HSS	Edathala
8	Eloor Govt. HSS	Kutikkattukara
9	Ezhikkara Govt. HSS	Ezhikkara
10	Kadayirippu Govt. HSS	Kadayirippu
11	Kaitharam Govt. VHSS	Kaitharam
12	Kalamassery Govt. HSS & VHSS	Kalamassery
13	Keezhmad Model Residential School	Thottumugham
14	Kongorppilly Govt. HSS	Kongorpilly
15	Kuttamassery Govt. HS	Thottumugham
16	Manjapra Govt. HSS	Manjapra
17	Mookkannoor Govt. HSS	Mookkannur
18	Mudickal Govt. HS	Mudickal
19	Muppathadom Govt. HSS	Muppathadom
20	Nayathode MGM Govt. HSS	Nayathode
21	North Paravoor Govt. Girls HSS	North Paravoor
22	North Paravoor Govt. HSS	North Paravoor
23	Pazhanthottam Govt. HSS	Pazhanthottam
24	Poothrikka Govt. HSS	Poothrikka
25	Puliyanam Govt. HSS	Puliyanam
26	Puthiyakavu Govt. HSS	Vadakkekara
27	South Ezhippuram Govt. HSS	South Vazhakulam
28	South Vazhakulam Govt. HSS	South Vazhakulam
29	Thrikkakara Govt. VHSS	Edathala
30	West Kadungallur Govt. HS	Aluva

==== Private Aided Schools ====
Sl No	School	Location
1	Alangad KEM HS	Alangad
2	Aluva SNDP HSS	Aluva
3	Aluva St. Francis Girls HSS	Aluva
4	Aluva St. Mary's HS	Aluva
5	Aluva The Standard Pottery works HS	Thaikkattukara
6	Angamali St. Joseph's HS	Angamaly
7	Angamaly Holy Family Girls HS	Angamaly
8	Ayroor St. Thomas HS	Ayroor
9	Chathedom St. Joseph's HS	Thiruthipuram
10	Chengal St. Joseph's Girls HS	Kalady
11	Elenthikkara High School	Elenthikkara
12	Gothuruthy St. Sebastian's HSS	Gothuruthy
13	Kakkanad Mar Athanasius HS	Kakkanad
14	Kalady Brahmanandodayam HSS	Kalady
15	Kalady Kalady Plantation HS	Kalady Plantation
16	Kalamassery HMT Educational Society HS	Kalamassery
17	Kaniattunirappu St. John's JSHS	Kuzhiyara
18	Kanjoor St. Joseph's CGHS	Kanjoor
19	Kanjoor St. Sebastian's HS	Kanjoor
20	Karimpadam DD Sabha HS	Chendamangalam
21	Karukutty St. Joseph's Girls HS	Karukutty
22	Karukutty Star Jesus HS	Karukutty
23	Karumalloor Fr. Menachery CTHS	Manakkappady
24	Kidangoor St. Joseph's HS	Kidangoor
25	Kizhakkambalam St. Joseph's HS	Kizhakkambalam
26	Kolenchery St. Peter's VHSS & HSS	Kolenchery
27	Koonammavu St. Philomina's HSS	Koonammavu
28	Kottuvallikadu HMYS HSS	Moothakunnam
29	Kuttipuzha Christ Raj HS	Kunnukara
30	Malayattoor St. Thomas HSS	Malayattoor
31	Manickamangalam NSS Girls HS	Kalady
32	Manickamangalam NSS HSS	Kalady
33	Marampally Nasrath-ul Islam VHSS	Marampally
34	Mookkannoor Sacred Heart Orphanage HS	Mookkannoor
35	Moothakunnam SNM HSS	Moothakunnam
36	Morakkala St. Mary's HSS	Kumarapuram
37	Nedumbassery Mar Athanasius HS	Athani
38	Neeleswaram SNDP HSS	Neeleswaram
39	Njaralloor Bethlehem Girls HS	Kizhakkambalam
40	North Paravoor Samooham HS	North Paravoor
41	North Paravoor SNV Sanskrit HSS	North Paravoor
42	North Paravoor Sree Narayana HSS	North Paravoor
43	North Paravoor St. Alosius HS	North Paravoor
44	Panaikulam Little Flower HS	Panaikulam
45	Parakadavu NSS HSS	Kurumassery
46	Pattimattom Mar Coorilose Memorial HSS	Pattimattom
47	Poovathussery St. Joseph's Girls HS	Parakkadavu
48	Puthencruze MGM HS	Puthencruze
49	Puthenpally St. George HS	Varapuzha
50	Puthenvelikkara VCS HSS	Puthenveli
51	Sreemoolanagaram Akavoor HS	Sreemoolanagaram
52	Thabore Holy Family High School	Mookkannoor
53	Thiruvaniyoor St. Philomina's HS	Thiruvaniyoor
54	Thottakkattukara Holy Ghost CGHSS	Thottakkattukara
55	Thrikkakara Cardinal HSS	Thrikkakara
56	Thuravoor Mar Augustine's HS	Thuravoor
57	Vadavucode Rajarshi Memorial HSS	Vadavucode
58	Varapuzha Holy Infant's Boys HS	Varapuzha
59	Varapuzha St. Joseph's HS for Girls	Varapuzha
60	Vennikulam St. George's HS	Kokkapilly

==== Private Unaided Schools ====
Sl No	School	Location
1	Aluva Christava Mahilalayam Girls HS	Aluva
2	Aluva Islamic High School	Aluva
3	Aluva St. John the Baptist CSI EMHS	Aluva
4	Aluva Vidyadhiraja Vidya Bhavan EMHS	Aluva
5	Ambalamedu High School	Ambalamedu
6	Ambalamedu St. Jude's EMHS	Ambalamedu
7	Angamaly De Paul EMHS	Angamaly South
8	Asokapuram St. Francis De Assisi HS	Asokapuram
9	Edanad Vijnanadeepam EMHS	Sreemoolanagaram
10	Edathala KNM MESHS	Edathala
11	Eloor FACT Township HS	Udyogamandal
12	Eloor St. Ann's EMHS	Udyogamandal
14	Koonammavu St. Joseph's Girls HS	Koonammavu
15	Kuzhuvelipady KMEA Al Manar EMHS	Edathala
16	Manjummel Guardian Angels HS	Manjummel
18	Nazareth Nirmala EMHS	Aluva
19	Panaikulam AL Huda EM HS	Panaikulam
20	Puthencruze Mar Athanasius Memorial EMHS	Puthencruze
21	Rajagiri Higher Secondary School	Kalamassery
21	The Alwaye Settlement HS	Aluva
22	Thrikkakara Hill Valley HS	Kalamassery
23	Thrikkakara Mary Matha EMHS	Thrikkakara

=== Ernakulam Educational District ===
==== Government Schools ====
Sl No	School	Location
1	Central Calvathy Govt. HSS	Fort Kochi
2	Chottanikkara Govt. HSS & VHSS	Chottanikkara
3	Edacochi Govt. HS	Edacochi
4	Edappally Govt. HSS	Edappally
5	Edappally North Govt. HSS & VHSS	Edappally North
6	Elamakkara Govt. HSS	Elamakkara
7	Elamkunnapuzha Govt. HSS	Elamkunnapuzha
8	Ernakulam Govt. HSS for Girls	M.G. Road
9	Ernakulam SRV Govt. Model HSS & VHSS	Ernakulam Bazar
10	Fortcochi EM Govt. GHSS	Veli
11	Kadamakudy Govt. HSS & VHSS	Pizhala
12	Mangayil Govt. VHSS	Maradu
13	Mattancherry Govt. HSS for Girls	Mattancherry
14	Mulanthuruthy Govt. HSS	Mulanthuruthy
15	Njarakkal Govt. HSS & VHSS	Njarakkal
16	Panampilly Nagar Govt. HS	Panampilly Nagar
17	Panayappilly Govt. HS	Mattancherry
18	Pulickamaly Govt. HS	Pulickamaly
19	Puthenthode Govt. HSS	Andikkadavu
20	Thevara Govt. RFTHS	Thevara
21	Thiruvankulam Govt. HS	Thiruvankulam
22	Tripunithura Govt. Boy's HSS & VHSS	Tripunithura
23	Tripunithura Govt. Girls HSS	Tripunithura
24	Tripunithura Govt. Palace Girls HS	Tripunithura
25	Tripunithura Govt. Sanskrit HSS	Tripunithura
26	Vennala Govt. HSS	Vennala
27	Willington Island Govt. HS	Willington Island
28	Model Technical Higher Secondary School	Kaloor

==== Private Aided Schools ====
Sl No	School	Location
1	Arakkunnam St. George's HS	Arakkunnam
2	Chathiath St. Joseph's HS	Pachalam
3	Chellanam St. Mary's HS	Chellanam
4	Cherai Rama Verma Union High School	Cherai
5	Cherai Sahodaran Memorial HSS	Cherai
6	Cheranelloor Al Farookhia HS	Cheranelloor
7	Chullickal St. Joseph's HS	Palluruthy
8	Edappally Pius Girls HS	Edappally
9	Edappally St. George's HS	Edappally
10	Edavanakkad Hidayathul Islam HSS	Edavanakkad
11	Edavanakkad KPMHS	Edavanakkad
12	Eranakulam LMCCHS for Girls	Pachalam
13	Ernakulam Darul Uloom HSS	Pullepady
14	St. Albert's HSS, Ernakulam	Ernakulam
15	Ernakulam St. Augustin's HS	Kaloor
16	Ernakulam St. Mary's CGHSS	Ernakulam
17	Ernakulam St. Teresa's HSS	Ernakulam
18	Fortcochin Fathima Girls HS	Kochi
19	Fortcochin Santa Cruze HSS	Kochi
20	Fortcochin St. John De Britto's AIHS	Kochi
21	Fortcochin St. Mary's AIGHSS	Fort Kochi
22	Irimpanam VHSS	Irimpanam
23	Kacheripady St. Antony's HSS	Ernakulam North
24	Kandanad St. Mary's HS	Kandanad
25	Kanjiramattom St. Ignatious HSS & VHSS	Kanjiramattom
26	Kannamaly St. Mary's HS	Kannamaly
27	Kothad HSS of Jesus	Kothad
28	Kumbalam RPMHSS	Kumbalam
29	Kumbalangy Our Lady of Fathima Girls HS	Kumbalangy
30	Kumbalangy St. Peter's HSS	Kumbalangy
31	Kuzhippilly St. Augustin's GHS	Ayyampilly
32	Mattancherry HEHMMHS	Mattancherry
33	Mattancherry LLCHS	Mattancherry
34	Mattancherry TDHSS	Mattancherry
35	Mundamveli St. Louis HS	Mundamveli
36	Nayarambalam Bhagavathy Vilasom HS	Nayarambalam
37	Njarakkal Little Flower HS	Njarakkal
38	Ochanthuruth Santa Cruz HS	Ochanthuruthu
39	Palliport St. Mary's HS	Palliport
40	Palluruthy Our Lady's CGHS	Palluruthy
41	Palluruthy SDPY Boys HSS	Palluruthy
42	Palluruthy SDPY Girls VHSS	Palluruthy
43	Palluruthy St. Sebastian's HSS	Palluruthy
44	Panangad VHSS	Panangad
45	Panayappilly MMOVHSS	Mattancherry
46	Perumanoor CCPLMAIHS	Perumanoor
47	Perumanoor St. Thomas Girls HS	Perumanoor
48	Ponnarimangalam Hidayathul Islam HS	Mulavukad
49	Ponnurunny Christ King CGHS	Vyttila
50	Ponnurunny St. Ritas HS	Vyttila
51	Poothotta KPMHSS	Poothotta
52	Saudi Loretto AIHS	Mundamvely
53	Shree Shankara Vidyalaya	Elamakkara
54	Thalacode St. Mary's HSS	Thalacode
55	Thevara St. Mary's UPS	Thevara
56	Sacred Heart Higher Secondary School	Thevara
57	Thrikkanarvattom Sree Narayana HSS	Ayyappankavu
58	Udayamperoor SNDP HSS	Nadakkavu
59	Udyogamandal School	Eloor
60	Vallarpadom St. Mary's HS	Vallarpadom

==== Private Unaided Schools ====
Sl No	School	Location
1	Greets Public School	Kaloor
2	Kaloor ACS EMHS	Kaloor
3	Kaloor St. Joachims HS	Kaloor
4	Karanakodam St. Jude's EMHS	Thammanam
5	Mattancherry Aasia Bai EMHS	Mattancherry
6	Mattancherry Sri Gujarathi Vidyalaya HS	Mattancherry
7	Nayarambalam Lobelia EMHS	Nayarambalam
8	Palluruthy St. Domenic's EM HS	Palluruthy
9	Perumpally Hail Mary EMHS	Mulanthuruthy
10	Poonithura St. George's HS	Poonithura
11	Thammanam MPMHS	Thammanam
12	Thiruvankulam Georgian Academy EM School	Thiruvankulam
13	Thrpoonithura Sree Venkiteswara EMHS	Thripoonithura
14	Tripunithura St. Joseph's CGHS	Tripunithura
15	Vypeen Lady of Hope AIHS	Azheekkal
16	St. Treasa's Convent Girls Higher Secondary School	Ernakulam
17	SDPY Central School	Palluruthy
18	St. Aloysius Convent ISC School	Palluruthy

=== Kothamangalam Educational District ===
==== Government Schools ====
Sl No	School	Location
1	Akanad Govt. HSS	Mudakuzha
2	Ayyankavu Govt. HS	Kuthukuzhi
3	Chathamattam Govt. HSS	Paingottoor
4	Cheranelloor Govt. HSS	Koovappady
5	CheruvattoorGovt. Model HSS	Kothamangalam
6	Iringole Govt. VHSS	Iringole
7	Kadavoor Govt. VHSS	Kadavoor
8	Kallil Govt. HSS	Methala
9	Kuttampuzha Govt. HSS	Kothamangalam
10	Mathirappilly Govt. HS	Kothamangalam
11	Neriamangalam Govt. VHSS	Neriamangalam
12	Odakkali Govt. VHSS	Asamannoor
13	Pallarimangalam Govt. VHSS	Pallarimangalam
14	Perumbavoor Govt. HSS	Perumbavoor
15	Perumbavoor Govt. HSS for Girls	Perumbavoor
16	Poika Govt. HS Vadattupara,	Kothamangalam

==== Private Aided Schools ====
Sl No	School	Location
1	Kavalangad St. John's HSS	Nellimattam
2	Keerampara St. Stephen's Girls HS	Kothamangalam
3	Keerampara St. Stephen's HSS	Kothamangalam
4	Keezhillam St. Thomas HSS	Keezhillam
5	Kodanad Mar Augen HS	Perumbavoor
6	Koovappady Ganapathy Vilasom HS	Perumbavoor
7	Kothamangalam Mar Basil HSS	Kothamangalam
8	Kothamangalam St. Augustine's Girls HSS	Kothamangalam
9	Kothamangalam St. George's HSS	Kothamangalam
10	Kottappady Mar Elias HSS	Kottappady
11	Krariyeli St. Mary's HS	Kombanad
12	Kuruppumpady MGM HSS	Perumbavoor
13	Okkal Sree Narayana HSS	Okkal
14	Oonnukal Little Flower HS	Kothamangalam
15	Paingottoor St. Joseph's HSS	Paingottoor
16	Perumbavoor Asram HSS	Perumbavoor
17	Pindimana TV Joseph Memorial HS	Chelad
18	Pothanikkad St. Mary's HS	Kothamangalam
19	Pulluvazhy Jayakeralam HSS	Perumbavoor
20	Puthuppady Fr. Joseph Memorial HSS	Puthuppady
21	Thandekkad Jama-ath HSS	Mudickal
22	Tholely MD HSS	Ayroorpadam
23	Thrikkariyoor Devaswam Board HS	Kothamangalam
24	Valayanchirangara HSS	Perumbavoor
25	Varappetty NSS HSS	Varappetty
26	Velielchal St. Joseph's HS	Thattekkad
27	Vengola Salem HS	Perumbavoor
28	Vengoor Mar Kouma HSS	Vengoor

==== Private Unaided Schools ====
Sl No	School	Location
1	Greenvalley Public School	Kothamangalam
2	Mar Athanasius International School Kothamangalam	Kothamangalam
3	Kuthukuzhi Sobhana EMHS	Kuthukuzhi
4	Perumbavoor Queen Mary's EMHS	Mudickal
5	Ponjassery Al Ashar EMHS	Ponjassery
6	Thannipuzha Anitha Vidyalaya	Okkal
7	Vengola National School	Vengola
8	Kandanthara Hidayathul Islam HS	Allapra

=== Muvattupuzha Educational District ===
==== Government Schools ====
Sl No	School	Location
1	Athanickal Govt. HSS	Mannathur
2	East Marady Govt. VHSS	Marady East
3	Mamalassery Govt. HSS	Mamalassery
4	Maneed Govt. HSS & VHSS	Maneed
5	Muvattupuzha Govt. East HS	Muvattupuzha
6	Muvattupuzha Govt. Model HSS	Muvattupuzha
7	Namakuzhi Govt. HSS	Mulakulam North
8	Ooramana Govt. HSS	Ooramana
9	Palakuzha Govt. Model HSS	Palakuzha
10	Pampakuda Govt. HSS	Pampakuda
11	Pezhakkappilly Govt. HSS	Pezhakkappilly
12	Piravom Govt. HSS	Piravom
13	Sivankunnu Govt. HSS	Muvattupuzha
14	Thirumarady Govt. HS	Thirumarady

==== Private Aided Schools ====
Sl No	School	Location
1	Anicadu St. Sebastine's HS	Avoly
2	Arakuzha St. Joseph's Girls HS	Arakuzha
3	Arakuzha St. Mary's HSS	Arakuzha
4	Ayavana Sacred Heart HS	Ayavana
5	Elanji St. Peter's HSS	Elanji
6	Kadalikkad Vimalamatha HS	Kadalikkad
7	Kalloorkad St. Augustine's HSS	Kalloorkad
8	Kaloor Iype Memorial HS	Kaloor
9	Kavunkara Tharbiyath Trust HSS & VHSS	Muvattupuzha Market
10	Koothattukulam High School	Koothattukulam
11	Mannoor NSS High School	Keezhillam
12	Memadangu St. Sebastian's HS	Memadangu
13	Mutholapuram St. Paul's HS	Mutholapuram
14	Muvattupuzha NSS HS	Muvattupuzha Market
15	Muvattupuzha SNDP HSS	Muvattupuzha
16	Muvattupuzha St. Augustine's Girls HSS	Muvattupuzha
17	Nakapuzha St. Mary's HS	Nakapuzha
18	Pampakuda MTM HS	Pampakuda
19	Piravom MKM HSS	Piravom
20	Piravom St. Joseph's HS	Piravom
21	Pulinthanam St. John's HS	Pothanikad
22	Ramamangalam High School	Ramamangalam
23	South Mazhuvannoor MRSV HS	Mazhavannoor
24	Vadakara Little Flower Girls HS	Oliyapuram
25	Vadakara St. John's Syrian HSS	Oliyapuram
26	Valakom Mar Stephen VHSS	Kunnackal
27	Vazhakulam Infant Jesus HS	Vazhakulam
28	VazhakulamSt. Little Teresas Girls HS	Muvattupuzha
29	Veettoor Ebenezer HS	Nellad
30	Veliyanad St. Paul's HS	Veliyanadu

==== Private Unaided Schools ====
Sl No	School	Location
1	Kavumkara MIET HS	Muvattupuzha Market
2	Koothattukulam Bappuji EMHS	Koothattukulam
3	Koothattukulam Infant Jesus EM HS	Koothattukulam
4	Mannoor Guardian Angel's EMHS	Keezhillam
5	Muvattupuzha Nirmala HS	Muvattupuzha
6	Piravom Fathima Matha EMHS	Piravom
7	Randarkara HMHS	Muvattupuzha
8	Vivekananda Vidyalayam	Kadathi
9	Mar Ignathiose Noorono Public school	Mekkadampu
10	Springdales English Medium School	Pampakuda

== Schools affiliated to the National Institute of Open Schooling (NIOS) ==
Sl No	School	Location	Affiliation
1	Saraswathy Vidyanikethan High School	Chengamanad P.O, Aluva- 683 578	Vidyabharati/NIOS
2	Velmuruga Vidyanikethan-UP	Mannam. P.O North Paravoor- 683520	Vidyabharathi/NIOS
3	Saraswathy Vidyanikethan -UP	Kunnukara P.O, Vayalkkara Aluva- 683524	Vidyabharathi/NIOS
4	Sree Agamananda Vidyanikethan- LP	Sreemoolanagaram P.O Aluva-683580	Vidyabharathi/NIOS
5	Mookambika Vidyanikethan- UP	Municipal Jn. North Paravoor- 683513	Vidyabharathi/NIOS
6	Sreedurga Sisu Mandiram-SV	Chirakkakam Varappuzha P.O- 683517	Vidyabharathi/NIOS
7	Sree Sarada Sisu Mandiram-SV	Mookkannur Azhakam P.O- 683577	Vidyabharathi/NIOS
8	Vivekanandavidyalayam- HS	Kadathi East, Market P.O Muvattupuzha-686673	Vidyabharathi/NIOS
9	Gokulam Vidyanikethan- UP	Pattimattom P.O – 683562	Vidyabharathi/NIOS
10	Saraswathy Vidyamandir- UP	Kalloorkkadu P.O Muvattupuzha- 686668	Vidyabharathi/NIOS
11	Saraswathy Vidya Peedom- LP	Karamala P.O, Kozhippilly, Koothattukulam	Vidyabharathi/NIOS
12	Saraswathy Vidyanikethan- UP	Airapuram P.O 683541	Vidyabharathi/NIOS
13	Saraswathy Vidyanikethan- UP	Ramamangalam P.O Muvattupuzha-686663	Vidyabharathi/NIOS
14	Vyasa Vidyalayam -UP	Rakkad, Mekkadambu P.O Muvattupuzha-682316	Vidyabharathi/NIOS
15	Shree Shankara Vidyalaya U.P school	Elamakkara, Ernakulam	Vidyabharathi/NIOS

== Schools affiliated to the Central Board of Secondary Education (CBSE) ==
Sl No	School	Location
1	Adam Public School	Angamaly
2	Adarsha Vidya Bhavan	North Paravur
3	Al Ameen International Pub School	Edathala
4	Al-Ameen Public School	Edapally
5	Alangad Jama-Ath Public School	Karumalloor
6	Alhuda Public School	Panayikulam
7	Amrita Vidyalayam	Perumbavoor
8	Amrita Vidyalayam	Peeliyad
9	Arafa Public School	Pezhakkapilly
10	Asoka World School	Elamakkara
11	Assisi Vidya Niketan Public School	Kakkanad
12	Assisi Vidyaniketan Public School	Narakkal
13	Bappuji English Medium School	Koothattukulam
14	Baselios Augen Public School	Kodanad
15	Baselios Vidyanikethan	Mulanthuruthy
16	Bethsada Public School	Vengola
17	Bhavan's Adarsha Vidyalaya	Kakkanad
18	Bhavan's Varuna Vidyalaya	Thrikkakara
19	Bhavans Vidya Mandir	Giri Nagar
20	Bhavan's Vidya Mandir	Eroor
21	Bhavan's Vidya Mandir	Elamakkara
22	Bright Public School	Muvattupuzha
23	Campion School	Edapally
24	Chavara Darshan Cmi Public School	Koonammavu
25	Chinmaya Vidyalaya	Thripunithura
26	Chinmaya Vidyalaya	Vaduthala
27	Chinmaya Vidyalaya	Kannamaly
28	Christu Jayanthi Public School	Kakkanad
29	Christva Mahilalayam Public School	Aluva
30	Cochin Public School	Thrikkakara
31	Cochin Refineries School	Ambalamugal
32	Crescent public school	Aluva
33	Exodus Public School	Nazareth
34	Fatima Central School	Piravom
35	German Metropolitan International School	Kakkanad
36	Greenvalley Public School	Kothamangalam
37	Greets Public School	Kaloor
38	Greets Academy	Kaloor
39	Gregorian Public School	Maradu
40	Hindu Dharma Paripalana Yogam Eng Me	Moothakunnam
39	Global Public School	Thiruvaniyur
41	Hira Public School	Panangad
42	Holy Angels Public School	Pothanikad
43	Holy India Foundation School	North Paravur
44	I G M Public School	Kochi
45	Ideal Public School	Aluva
46	Infant Jesus Public School	North Paravur
47	Infant Jesus Public School	Aluva
48	Irshadiya Pub School	Kothamangalam
49	Jama-Ath Residential Public School	Kakkanad
50	Jamia Hassania Public School	Aluva
51	Jawahar Navodaya Vidyalaya	Neriamangalam
52	Jnanodayam Public School	Edakochi
53	K M J Public School	Kanjiramattom
54	Kasturba English Medium School	Manjummel
55	Kendriya Vidyalaya, Ernakulam	Kadavanthra
56	Kendriya Vidyalaya, I.N.S. Dronacharya, Kochi	Mundamveli
57	Kendriya Vidyalaya NAD, Aluva	Kalamassery
58	Kendriya Vidyalaya No.1, Naval Base	Willingdon Island
59	Kendriya Vidyalaya No.2, Naval Base	Willingdon Island
60	Kendriya Vidyalaya Port Trust Kochi	Willingdon Island
61	Little Hearts School	North Paravur
62	Luke Memorial Public School	Perumbavoor
63	M.E.T. Public School	Perumbavoor
64	Mahatma Gandhi Public School	Thiruvankulam
65	Malik Deenar Pub School	Pothanikad
66	Mannam Memorial N S S Eng Med School	Puthenvelikkara
67	Mar Thoma Public School	Thengode
68	Marygiri CMI Public School (http://www.marygiri.org/)	koothattukulam
69	Mary Matha Public School	Thrikkakara
70	Modern Public School	Kakkanad
71	N S S Hr Sec School	Thripunithura
72	Naipunnya Public School	Edakunnam
73	Najath Public School	Kalamassery
74	Nalanda Public School	Thammanam
75	Nava Nirman Public School	Vazhakkala
76	Navy Children School	Naval Base
77	Nirmala Public School	Muvattupuzha
78	Parama Bhattara Kendriya Vidyalayam	Vadayampady
79	Prabhat Public School	Mulamthuruthy
80	Prabhat Residential Public School	Karimukal
81	Rajagiri Public School	Kalamassery
82	Rajashree (S M Memorial) School	Aluva
83	S B O A Public Sr Sec School	Ernakulam
84	S D P Y Central School	Kannamaly
85	Sacred Heart CMI Public School	Thevara
86	Sacred Heart Eng Med School	Angamaly
87	Santa Maria English Med School	Mundamvely
88	Santom Public School	Vengoor
89	Saraswathi Vidyanikethan Pub School	Kochi
90	Saraswathy Vidya Nikethan	Aluva
91	Saraswathy Vidya Nikethan	Chengamanad
92	Sobhana Public School	Kothamangalam
93	Sree Narayana Public School	Poothotta
94	Sree Narayana Vidyapeetam Public Sch	Thripunithura
95	Sree Sarada Vidyalaya	Kalady
96	St Anne's Public School	Perumbavoor
97	St Ann's Public School	Eloor
98	St Ethrem Seminary Public School	Mulanthuruthy
99	St Francies D'assisi English School	Aluva
100	St George Public School	Keezhillam
101	St Johns Public School	South Paravoor
102	St Juliana's Public School	Perumpadappu
103	St Mary's Public School	Perumbavoor
104	St Mary's Public School	Thamarachal
105	St Paul's International School	Kalamassery
106	St Paul's Public School	Fort Kochi
107	St Philomen's Public School	Elanji
108	St Xavier's Public School	Pothanikad
109	St Xavier's Public School	Angamaly
110	St. Antony's English Medium School	North Paravur
111	St. Peters Sr Sec School	Kadayiruppu
112	St. Stephen's Bes Ania Public School	Kothamangalam
113	St. Thomas Public School	Muvattupuzha
114	Stella Maris Convent School	Thiruvaniyoor
115	Talent Public School	Narakkal
116	Talent Public School	Aluva
117	Choice School	Thripunithura
118	The Dawn Public School	Palluruthy
119	The Delta Study	Fort Kochi
120	Toc H Public School	Vytilla
121	Toc H (R) Public School	Tripunithura
122	Vidhyadhiraja Vidya Bhavan Sr Sec Sc	Angamaly
123	Vidyodaya School	Thevakkal
124	Vimalagiri Public School	Kothamangalam
125	Viswajyothi Public School	Angamaly
126	Vyasa Vidyalaya	Kakkanad
127	Ilahia public school	muvattupuzha
128	St Joseph Senior Secondary English Medium School Pulluvazhy	Perumbavoor
129	The Adventure Senior Secondary School	Pampakuda
131	St Ritas Public School	Palluruthy
132	Ryan International	Kunnukara

== Schools affiliated to the Council for the Indian School Certificate Examinations (CISCE) ==
Sl No	School	Location	Affiliation
1	Auxilium School	Angamaly	ICSE
2	Seventh-day Adventist Higher Secondary School	Kaloor	ICSE & ISC
3	M.E.S. Udyogamandal School	Eloor	ICSE & ISC
4	St. Aloysius Convent I.S.C. School	Palluruthy	ICSE & ISC
5	Mount Tabor Residential Central School	Kalamassery	ICSE
6	Don Bosco Senior Secondary School	Vaduthala	ICSE & ISC
7	Matha Nagar Public School	Gandhi Nagar	ICSE & ISC
8	Vidya Vikas School	Kothamangalam	ICSE & ISC
9	St. Charles Borromeo Convent School	Kakkanad	ICSE
10	Mary Ward English Medium School	Puthenvelikara	ICSE
11	The Indian Public School	Kakkanad	ICSE & ISC
12	Auxilium English Medium School	Palluruthy	ICSE & ISC
13	Presidency Central School	Muvattupuzha	ICSE & ISC
14	Vimala Central School	Perumbavoor	ICSE
15	Rani Matha Public School	Jews Street	ICSE & ISC
16	Anita Public School	Okkal	ICSE
17	St. Patrick's Academy	Angamaly	ICSE & ISC
18	Jnanodaya Central School	Kalady	ICSE
19	Stella Maris Public School	Udayamperoor	ICSE
20	Don Bosco Central School	Angamaly	ICSE
21	Mar Athanasius International School	Kothamangalam	ICSE
22	Santhome Central School	Mookkannoor	ICSE
23	Jyothis Central School	Manjapra	ICSE
24	Carmel English Medium School	Valappu	ICSE
25	Jeevass CMI Central School	Aluva	ICSE
26	Vimalagiri International School	Muvattupuzha	ICSE
27	St.Mary's English Medium School	Kozhikode	ICSE & ISC
28	St. Francis English Medium School	Kozhikode	ICSE

== Schools offering International Curricula ==
Sl No	School	Location	Qualification(s) offered:
1	Dawn International School	Ambalamedu	Pearson IGCSE & Pearson GCE 'A' level
2	Global Public School	Thiruvaniyur	Cambridge IGCSE & Cambridge CGE 'A' level
3	German Metropolitan International School	Kakkanad	Pearson IGCSE & Pearson GCE 'A' level
4	The Indian Public School	Kakkanad	IB Diploma

== See also ==
- Ernakulam town
- Ernakulam district
- Educational institutions in Ernakulam district
