= Cochin Refineries School =

Cochin Refineries School, Vandipettah
- CRS

Location
- Vandipettah, Puthencruz P.O 682308; Kochi, Kerala; India
- Coordinates: 9.9386°N 76.4097°E

Information
- Type: Higher Secondary School
- Motto: "That they may be refined and radiate"
- Established: 1965
- School district: Ernakulam
- Chairman: K N Ravindran
- Principal: Vinumoan K Matthew
- Faculty: +91 0484 2714800
- Grades: 10+2
- Athletics: The school conducts two major athletic events, namely the Chacha Nehru Volleyball Tournament and the Refinian Cup Cricket Tournament. Participation in both events is generally from the schools in Ernakulam / Kochi.
- Affiliation: Central Board of Secondary Education
- Website: http://www.cochinrefineriesschool.ac.in

Cochin Refineries School is a higher secondary school situated in Kochi, Kerala, India. The school was relocated to its new campus near Vandipettah, Puthencruz on 2 December 2019.

== Overview ==
The school was established in 1966 for the children of employees of erstwhile Kochi Refineries Ltd (KRL). Admission is open to children of employees.

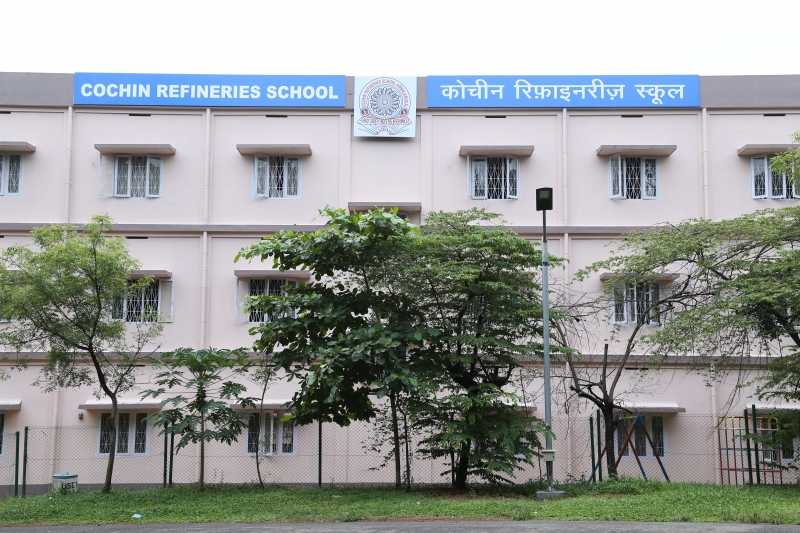
CR School, Ambalamugal campus (1966-2019)

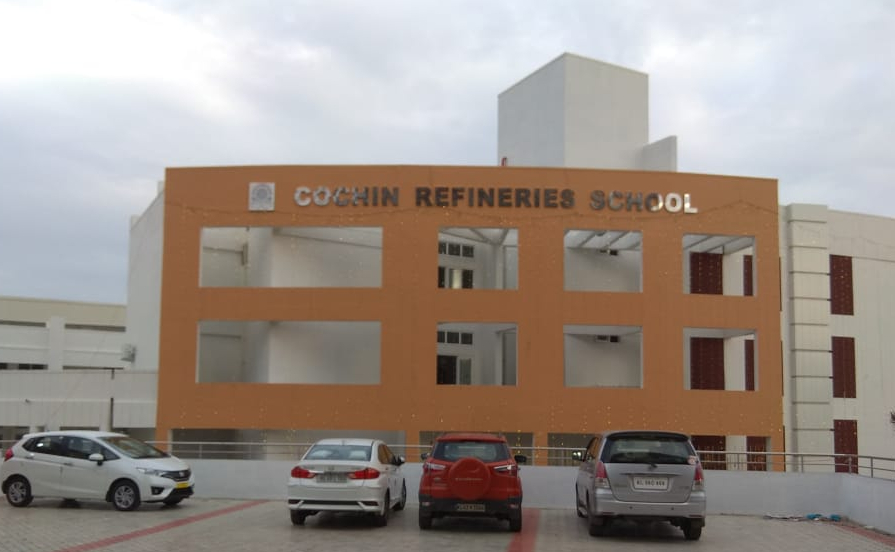
CR School, Vandipettah campus (since 2019)

Previously, the school was situated on the hilltop of Jwalagiri, Ambalamugal. On the 2nd of December 2019, the school relocated to its new campus near Vandipettah. The school is run by Cochin Refineries Educational Aid Society and managed by a Board of Governors nominated by the management of BPCL – Kochi Refinery. It is affiliated with the Central Board of Secondary Education (CBSE), New Delhi, and prepares students for the All India Secondary School Examination (AISSE) and All India Senior School Certificate Examination (AISSCE).

The motto of the school is "That they may be refined and radiate".

== See also ==
- List of schools in Ernakulam
