= Sree Rama Varma Higher Secondary School =

Coordinates: 9.970°N 76.286°E

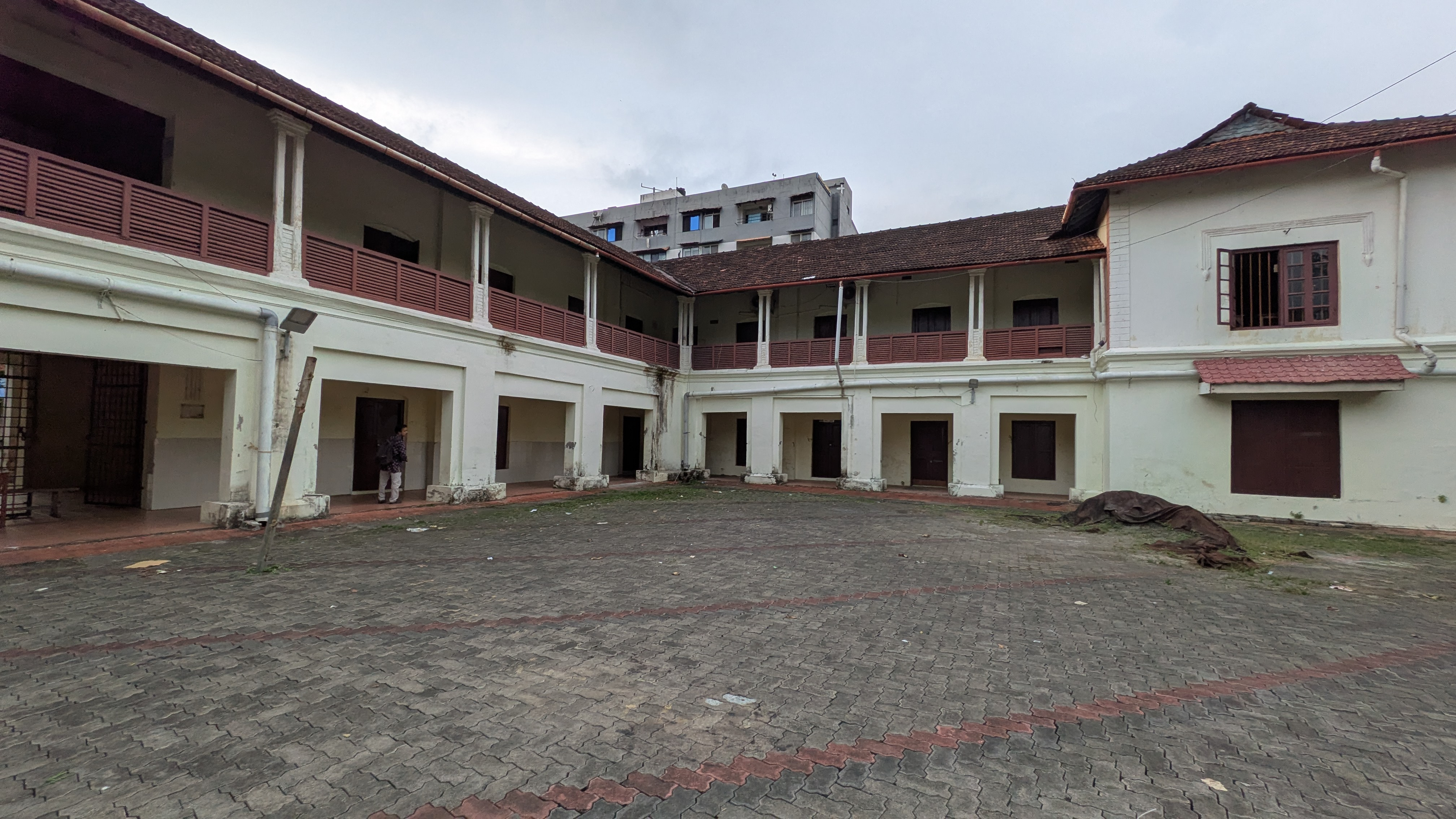
- SRVHSS, Ernakulam
- Kochi, Kerala; India

Information
- School type: Government owned, mixed
- Motto: Vidya Dhanam Sarva Dhanal Pradhanam (Knowledge is the greatest wealth)
- Established: 1845; 181 years ago
- Principal: Sri. Biju (as of July 2024)
- Grades: 1-12
- Enrolment: 2,200
- Campus type: Mixed (Higher Secondary)

Sree Rama Varma Higher Secondary School and popularly known as SRV School) is the largest government-owned school in Kochi, Kerala, India. It was founded by the Kochi Royal family as the English Elementary School in 1845. The school was later named after King Rama Varma of the founding Kochi Royal family. After the independence of India from British rule in 1947, and the reorganization of the states of India in 1956, the school was handed over to the Government of Kerala, which now owns and operates it.

== History ==
In 1845, the school was founded as the English Elementary School, located in what is now the campus of Maharaja's College, Ernakulam, established by the Diwan of Cochin, T. Shankara Warrier. It was renamed as His Highness, the Raja's School in 1865, and was upgraded to a college in 1875. Later, the school was separated from the college, was moved to its present location, and was renamed Sree Rama Varma High School.

== Organization ==
Sree Rama Varma Higher Secondary School offers curricula for grades 1 to 12. The school is administratively divided into four sections: Lower Primary (grades 1 to 4), Upper Primary (grades 5 to 7), High School (grades 8 to 10), and Higher Secondary (grades 11 and 12). The different sections have separate, though adjoining, campuses as well as separate administration.

== Architecture ==
The architecture of the school showcases the British architectural styling of colonial Kerala. It is a two-story building built using primarily lime and teak wood. The floor and roof utilize terracotta tiles.

== ISRO Space Museum ==
Donated by the Indian Space Research Organization (ISRO) during the term of the former chairman Krishnaswamy Kasturirangan, who is also an alumnus of the school, the school contains a Space Museum, which showcases the ISRO's space research and educates students in space science. The museum displays miniature replicas of ISRO's satellites as well as satellite launch vehicles. The exhibits educate students on various kinds of satellites and launch techniques, namely the ISRO's Polar Satellite Launch Vehicle, geosynchronous satellites, and related technologies and applications such as remote sensing. It was inaugurated by former President of India Dr. A. P. J. Abdul Kalam on 19 December 2006.

== Notable alumni ==
- Krishnaswami Kasturirangan, space scientist, member of the Planning Commission, former chairman of the Indian Space Research Organization
- Changampuzha Krishna Pillai, Malayalam poet, known for his pastoral elegy Ramanan
- Swami Chinmayananda, founder of Chinmaya Mission
- N. S. Madhavan, writer
- G. N. Ramachandran, scientist, physicist, and Nobel Prize nominee
- K. V. Thomas, former member of Parliament
- V. R. Krishna Iyer, former supreme court justice, critic, independent supporter of leftist movements
- Aashiq Abu, film director and producer best known for his work in Malayalam cinema
- Amal Neerad, filmmaker
- C. V. Subramanian, mycologist, Shanti Swarup Bhatnagar Prize recipient
- Justice Shaji P. Chaly, judge of Kerala High Court
- V. Viswanatha Menon, Minister of Finance in Kerala

== See also ==
- List of schools in Ernakulam
