= Alak =

Alak or ALAK may refer to:

- Alak, Iran, a village in Kurdistan Province, Iran
- Alak, Republic of Dagestan, a rural locality in Dagestan, Russia
- Alak Dolak, a game similar to baseball that is played in Iran
- Alak people, an Austro-Asiatic ethnic group of southern Laos
  - Alak language, a language spoken in southern Laos
- Arrack (drink), or Alak, an alcoholic beverage
- Alak, a fictional one-dimensional analogue of the Go board game from the novel The Planiverse

== People with the surname ==
- Julio Alak (born 1958), Argentine politician
- Alak Jigme Thinley Lhundup Rinpoche (1939–2012), Tibetan Rinpoche and politician
