= Kunpan Cultural School =

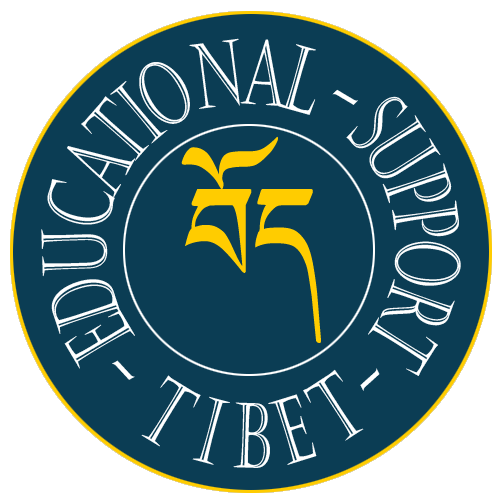
- Dharamshala, Himachal Pradesh; India

Information
- Type: Private
- Established: 2000
- Faculty: 9
- Enrollment: 24 (as of July 2015)
- Campus: Urban
- Houses: 1
- Affiliation: 2001
- Website: estibet.ch

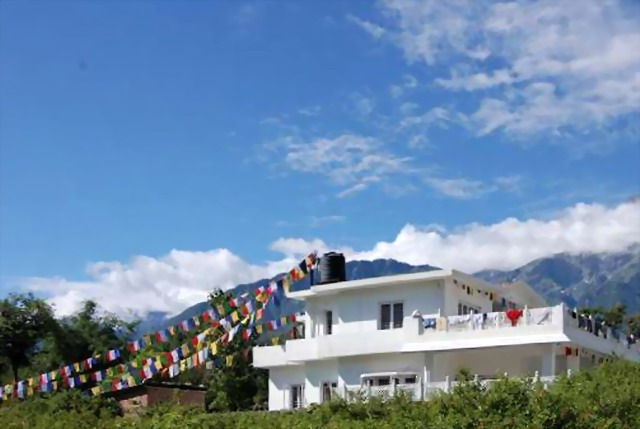
The Kunpan Cultural School building in Dharamshala

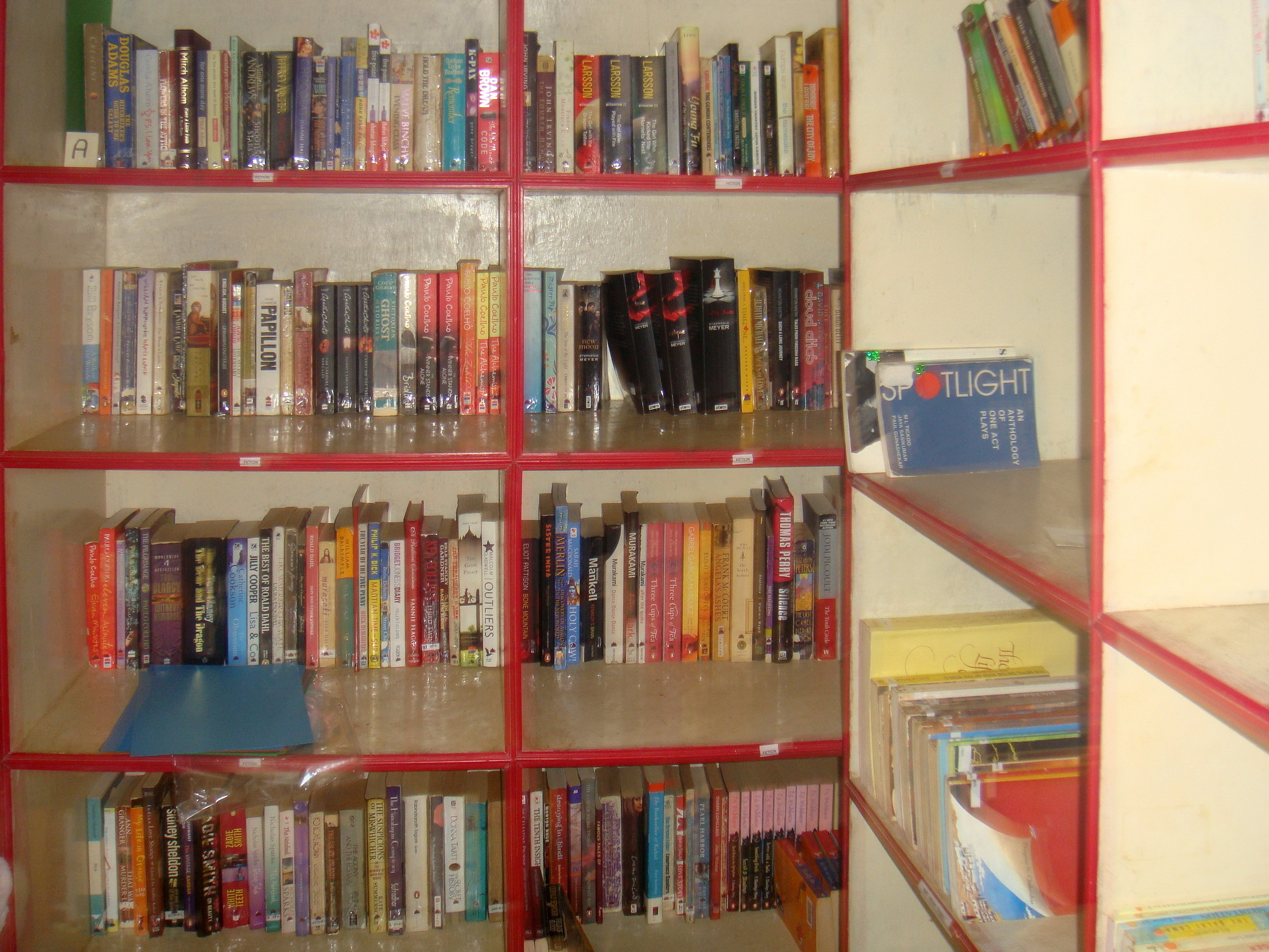
The small library of the school

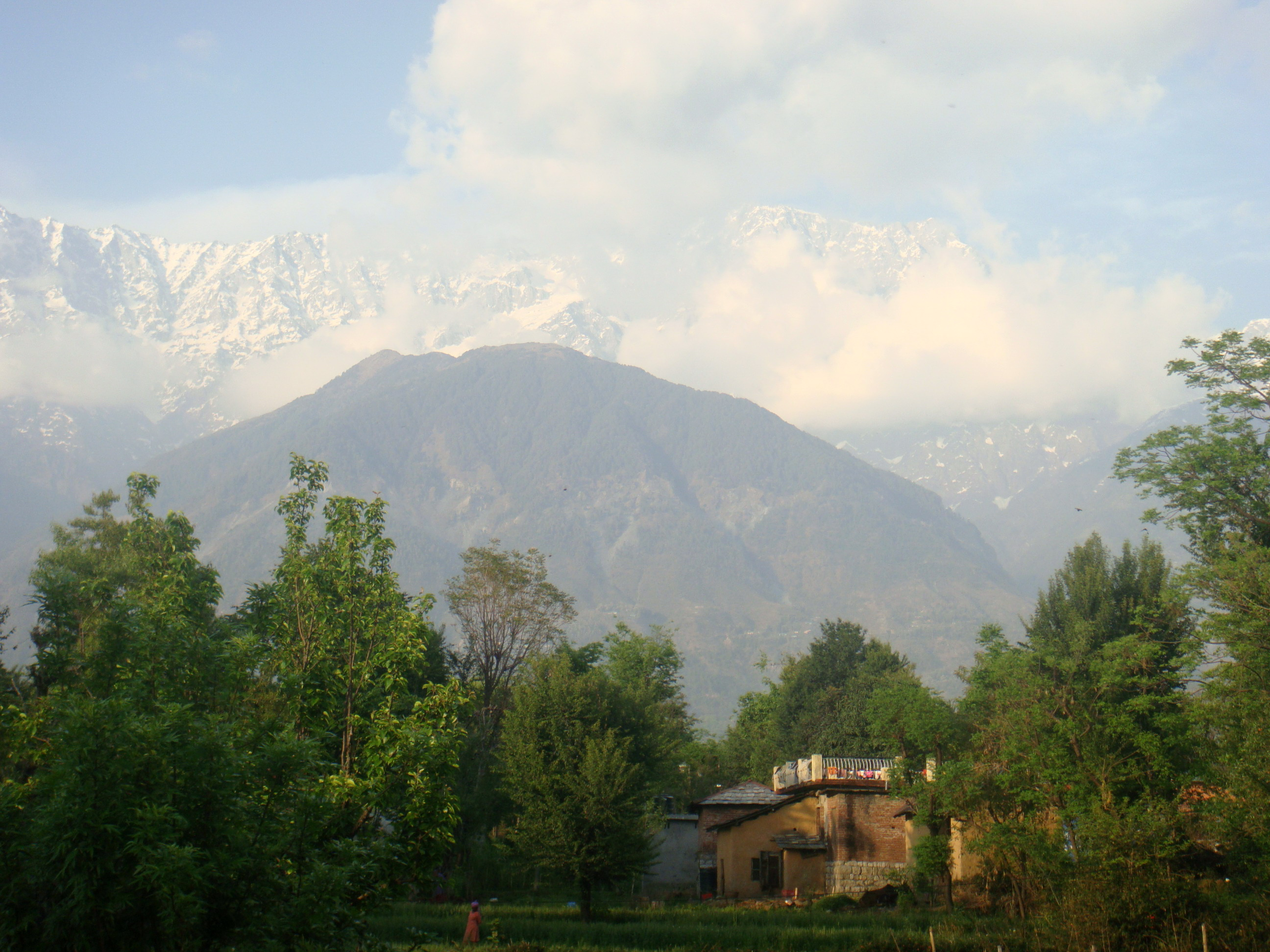
The Himalayas as seen from the school's location

The Kunpan Cultural School, provided by the Swiss-Tibetan foundation ES Tibet, is located in Dharamshala in the Indian state of Himachal Pradesh.

== History ==
In 2000 no institution existed that could provide young Tibetans refugees in India any further education except the basic scholar edition given by the Tibetan Transit School (T.T.S.). The Tibetan Exile Government in Dharamshala had already established educational support by setting up the T.T.S. in which newly arrived Tibetan refugees are educated for five years.

Having had the idea of setting up an educational organisation, but not having any practical experience, the project Educational Support Tibet (ES Tibet) started in October 2000 in Delhi with five students (four boys and one girl) who were leaving the TTS. The startup school was registered as a National Open School, to get either the 8th or 10th grade normal school qualification in India. At the beginning of 2002, courses for twenty female and male students in Whitefield, Bangalore, started in a building that had rooms enough to provide living quarters and classrooms. That first class finished in the summer of 2004, followed by a second group of twenty students that finished their studies in August 2006. Since the middle of 2006, the Kunpan Cultural School has been located in Dharamshala, the seat of the exile Tibetan Government and centre of the Tibetan diaspora in India.

Jigme Lhundup Rinpoche, the former speaker and minister of the Central Tibetan Administration, had been an important supporter of ES Tibet, and had contributed immensely toward overall development of Kunpan Cultural School. With his unmeasurable effort and clear vision had brought many supporters and great results both to students’ achievement and organisation development as whole. Supported by Jigme Lhundup Rinpoche, in June 2010 the board members of Kunpan Cultural School had the privilege of privately meeting the 14th Dalai Lama at his residence in Dharamsala. He acknowledged and appreciated the successful work that Kunpan have been doing for the previous ten years in terms of educating Tibetan refugees in India. He also encouraged the board members at least keep up the good work for another ten years. Knowing that the school didn't have an official name at that time as it uses ES Tibet, HH 14th Dalai Lama vested the name Kunpan Cultural School – Kunpan is a Tibetan word, meaning beneficial to all.

== Goals ==
Living too far away from schools, Tibetans who grow up in the rural areas of Tibet often have no possibility to attend a basic scholar education. In addition, fees for the Chinese state schools are so high that Tibetan families very often cannot afford it. To avoid the sad fate of an uneducated person or an analphabet, every year more than 4000 young Tibetans (aged 18 to 30) to refuge to Northern India where a large Tibetan diaspora is living.

Selected T.T.S students are educated for a further two years in English, computer skills and Chinese. These subjects were identified as key elements for professional success once the students will be back in Tibet. The Kunpan Cultural School promotes the independency of Tibetans with professional and personal training and thus makes an important contribution to the preservation and development of the traditional Tibetan culture. Within 2.5 years the students earn educational basics to aa level which corresponds with the 10th grade in India public schools. This level of general education will significantly enhance the students chances, to live their lives free and independent from the refugees center, in order to find their place in the society, and back at home in Tibet, to find themselves a job.

== Academics ==
Main subjects of the school are lessons in English and Chinese and computer skills, supported by additional workshops in mathematics, bookkeeping and Tibetan and Western philosophy. The professional training may permit the students to learn commercial and technical professions as well as nursing, education or home economics; but also professions in Information Technology sector.

The school has been run by Tibetans themselves, and beside the Tibetan manager and the permanently employed Tibetan teachers, there are always Volunteers from Western countries. The students live in a flat-sharing community and organise their cohabit by themselves.

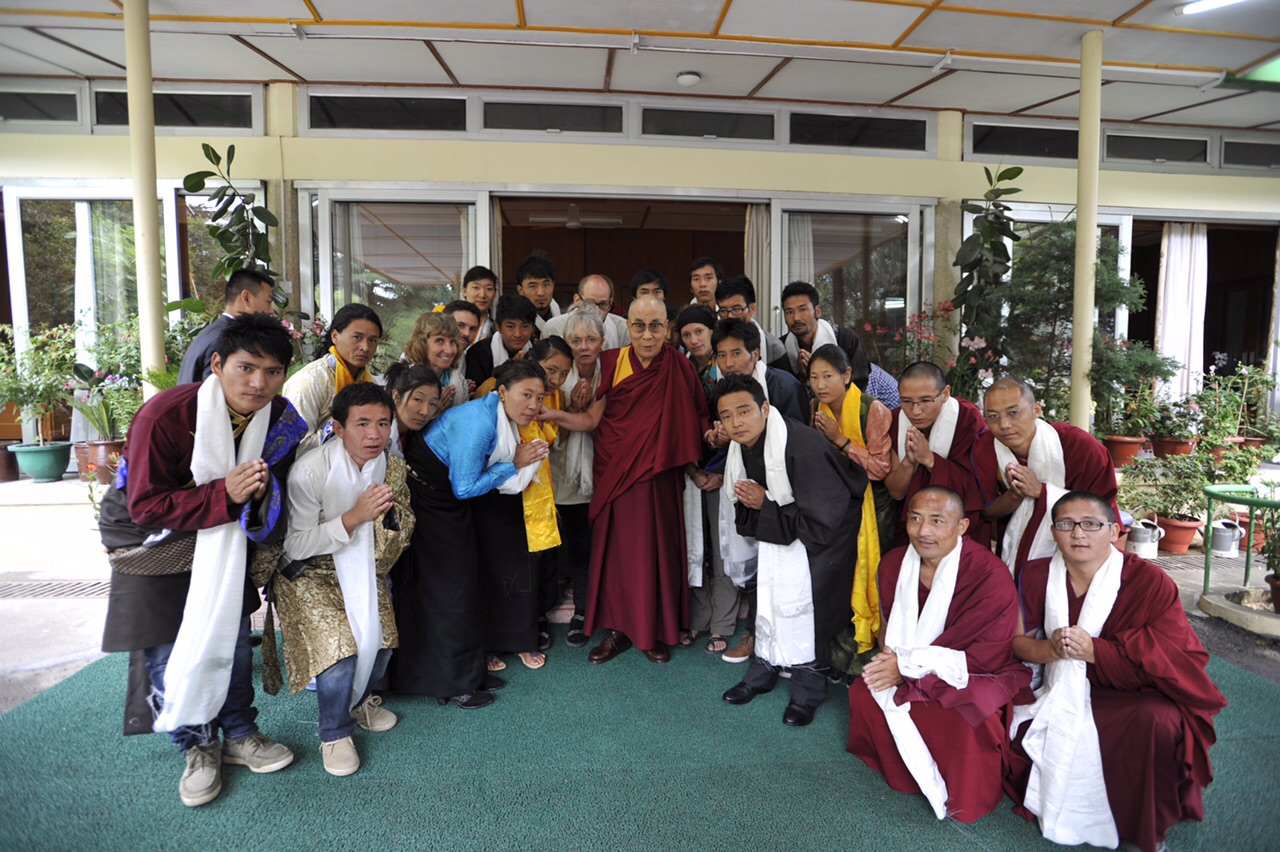
Kunpan Cultural School graduation class of 2015 with His Holyness, the 14th Dalai Lama in Dharamsala.

The current group of 24 students at the Kunpan Cultural School started their two years of study in July 2013 and have finished in June 2015. Among others, the'll absolve the Cambridge University Preliminary English Test (PET) and the First Certificate in English (FCE) examinations. For example, the curriculum of English lessons progresses from beginners’ level, using the Cambridge University English Tests, from Key English Test (KET), Preliminary English Test (PET), First Certificate in English (FCE) and Certificate of Advanced English (CAE). In the last fourteen years, about 130 students at Kunpan Cultural School have passed the KET examinations, and in all about 200 students attended Kunpan Cultural School.

Since most of the students will be going back to Tibet, the students learn Chinese at least at a level of everyday Chinese, which is essential for them to get a job back in their native land. The computing education includes computer fundamentals, Microsoft Office, web design, book publishing, Adobe CS4, Internet and Windows skils, hardware, network troubleshooting and configuration.

80% of the students who have completed their studies at Kunpan Cultural School have returned to Tibet and all of them have found employment there, some are self-employed, English teachers, tourist guides, some are working as translators in NGO's in Tibet and some are doing further education in China. One of the former students set up a school and two others started their own travel agency.

== Present situation ==
As there are always more applicants for places than the school was able to provide, it is planned to expand the school localities to host 40 students, thus the financial situation is unsure. The ES Tibet foundation strives towards donations and adaptations for Tibetan students of an age between 18 and 30 years. In 2012 a new building was inaugurated.

The 6th group of students graduated in June/July 2015, and the 7th group started their time at the Kunpan Cultural School in July 2015. Out of group of little more than 40 people, now 14 young men and 10 young women form the 2015/17 group of students, although there were not enough sponsors in Switzerland to support all of them, but to ensure capacity building to enable a better prospect for the student's future back in Tibet.
