= Sherab Gatsel Lobling School =

Coordinates: 32.2167°N 76.3167°E

- Dharamshala, Himachal Pradesh; India

Information
- Type: Public
- Established: 1993
- Enrolment: 400 (approximate)
- Campus: Urban

The Sherab Gatsel Lobling School, formerly known as Tibetan Transit School (T.T.S.), is located in Dharamshala, Himachal Pradesh, India.

== History ==
Formerly known as Tibetan Transit School, the Sherab Gatsel Lobling School was established on 7 March 1993, to provide education of new arrived young Tibetan people aged between 18 and 30 into the North Indian exile. Incepted on 1 April 1993, the school is administered by the Tibetan Reception Centre, which handed over the charge to the department of education in February 2002. The school has offered education to over 6,400 students since its inception.

== School organisation ==
Around more than 400 students get a five-year education with courses in Tibetan and English languages, computer courses, vocational courses in tailoring and painting by about 50 teachers and staff members.

The school comprises dormitories for boys and girls, and a teaching building and houses for the teachers. Usually these young adults may not been integrated into the Indian public school system. Living too far away from public schools, Tibetans who grow up in the rural areas of Tibet often have no possibility to attend a basic scholar education. About 60 percent of these students go after their training back to Tibet.

Selected T.T.S students are educated for a further two years in English, computer skills and Chinese in supporting projects, among them the Kunpan Cultural School provided by the ES Tibet foundation.
