= ES Tibet =

Swiss charitable organisation

Educational Support Tibet (ES Tibet)
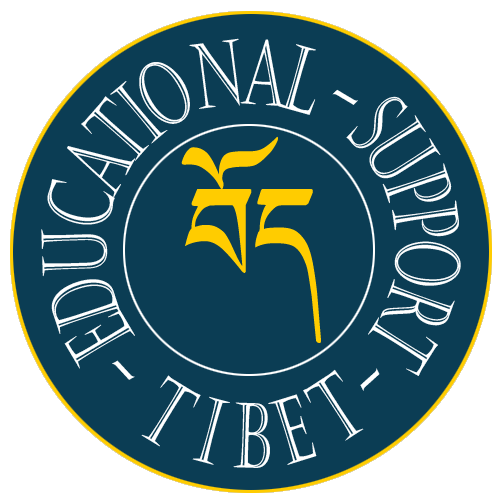
- Formation: • 2001, as Educational Support Tibet • 2000, first school in Whitefield, Bangalore, Karnataka, India • 2006, Kunpan Cultural School in Dharamshala, Himachal Pradesh, India
- Type: Non-profit organization
- Legal status: Foundation
- Headquarters: Zürich, Switzerland
- Region served: India
- President: Lugyal Gerster
- Website: estibet.ch

ES Tibet (Educational Support Tibet) is a charitable foundation in Switzerland. Established as a private initiative in 2000 in Whitefield, Bangalore, in the Indian state of Karnataka, in 2001 the non-profit organisation ES Tibet was founded in Switzerland. The foundation offers for Tibetan refugees opportunities for a professional education by earning the 8th or 10th grade school qualification in India. The foundation is based in Zürich, and since 2006 the Kunpan Cultural School for 24 students is in Dharamshala in the Indian state of Himachal Pradesh.

== History ==
Living too far away from schools, Tibetans who grow up in the rural areas of Tibet often have no possibility to attend a basic scholar education. In addition, fees for the Chinese state schools are so high that Tibetan families often cannot afford it. Every year thousands of young Tibetans (aged 18 to 30) cross the Himalayas to refuge to northern India where a large Tibetan diaspora is living.

Having had the idea of setting up an educational organisation, but not having any practical experience, the project Educational Support Tibet (E.S. Tibet) started in October 2000 in Delhi with five students (four boys and one girl) who were leaving the Tibetan Transit School (T.T.S). The startup school was registered as a National Open School, to get either the 8th or 10th grade normal school qualification in India. In addition, on October 12, 2001, ES Tibet was founded in Zürich, Switzerland, as a non-profit organisation to support and finance the school for those young refugees. At the beginning of 2002, courses for twenty students in Whitefield, Bangalore, Karnataka, started in a building that had rooms enough to provide living quarters and classrooms. That first class finished in the summer of 2004, followed by a second group of twenty students who finished their studies in August 2006. Since the middle of 2006, the Kunpan Cultural School has been in Dharamshala, the seat of the exile Tibetan Government and centre of the Tibetan diaspora in India.

== Goals ==
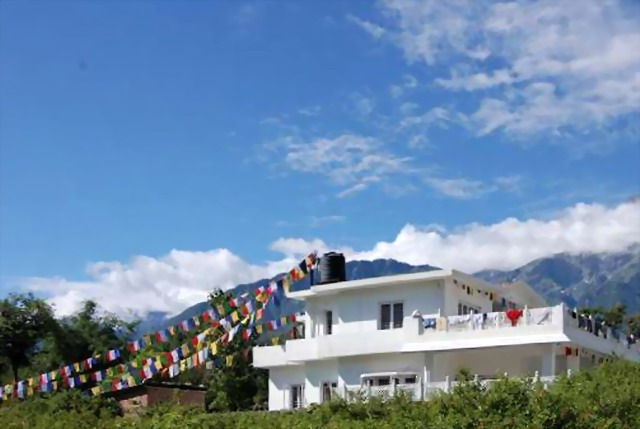
The Kunpan Cultural School building in Dharamshala

ES Tibet promotes the independency of Tibetans with professional and personal training and thus makes an important contribution to the preservation and development of the traditional Tibetan culture. Within 2.5 years the students earn educational basics to a level which corresponds with the 10th grade in India public schools. This level of general education will significantly enhance the students chances, to live their lives free and independent from the refugees center, in order to find their place in the society, and back at home in Tibet, to find themselves a job. The Tibetan Exile Government in Dharamsala had already established educational support by setting up the Tibetan Transit School (T.T.S.) in which newly arrived Tibetan refugees are educated for five years, complemented by the Kunpan Cultural School, in which selected T.T.S students are educated for a further two years in English, computer skills and Chinese. These subjects were identified as key elements for professional success once the students will be back in Tibet.

As there are always more applicants for places than the school is able to provide, it is planned to expand the school localities to host 40 students. The ES Tibet foundation strives towards donations and adaptations for Tibetan students of an age between 18 and 30 years.
