= Alak, Republic of Dagestan =

Alak Алак ГӀалахъ
- Selo
- Location within Republic of Dagestan Location within Russia
- Coordinates: 42°36′N 46°11′E
- Country: Russia
- Region: Republic of Dagestan
- District: Botlikhsky District
- Time zone: UTC+3:00

Alak (Russian: Алак; Avar: ГӀалахъ) is a rural locality (a selo) in Botlikhsky District, Republic of Dagestan, Russia. The population was 2,764 as of 2010. There are 32 streets.

== Geography ==
Alak is located 14 km southwest of Botlikh (the district's administrative centre) by road. Kheleturi is the nearest rural locality.
