= Alak Jigme Thinley Lhundup Rinpoche =

Tibetan religious teacher (1939–2012)

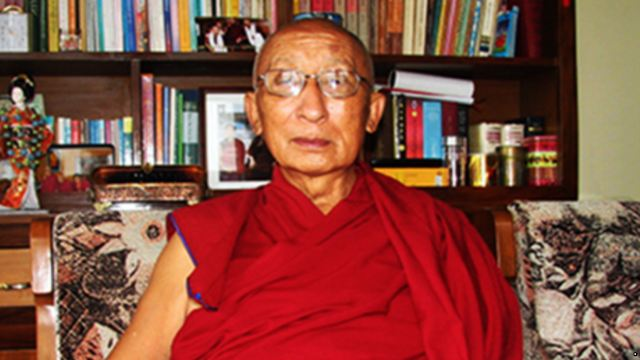
- Alak Jigme Rinpoche in probably 2012
- Born: 1939; Rebkong, Amdo, Tibet
- Died: 26 July 2012 (aged 73); Shri Balaji Hospital at Kangra
- Other names: Alak Jigme Thinley Lhundup; Alak Jigme Lhundup; Alak Jigme Rinpoche
- Years active: 1952–2012
- Known for: Tulku and Rinpoche, former speaker of the Tibetan Parliament in Exile and a former Minister with the exile Tibet administration

Alak Jigme Thinley Lhundup or Alak Jigme Lhundup or Alag Jigme Lhundub Rinpoche (1939 – 26 July 2012) was a Tibetan Tulku, as well as the former speaker of the Tibetan Parliament in Exile and former Minister with the exile Tibet administration.

== Life and work ==
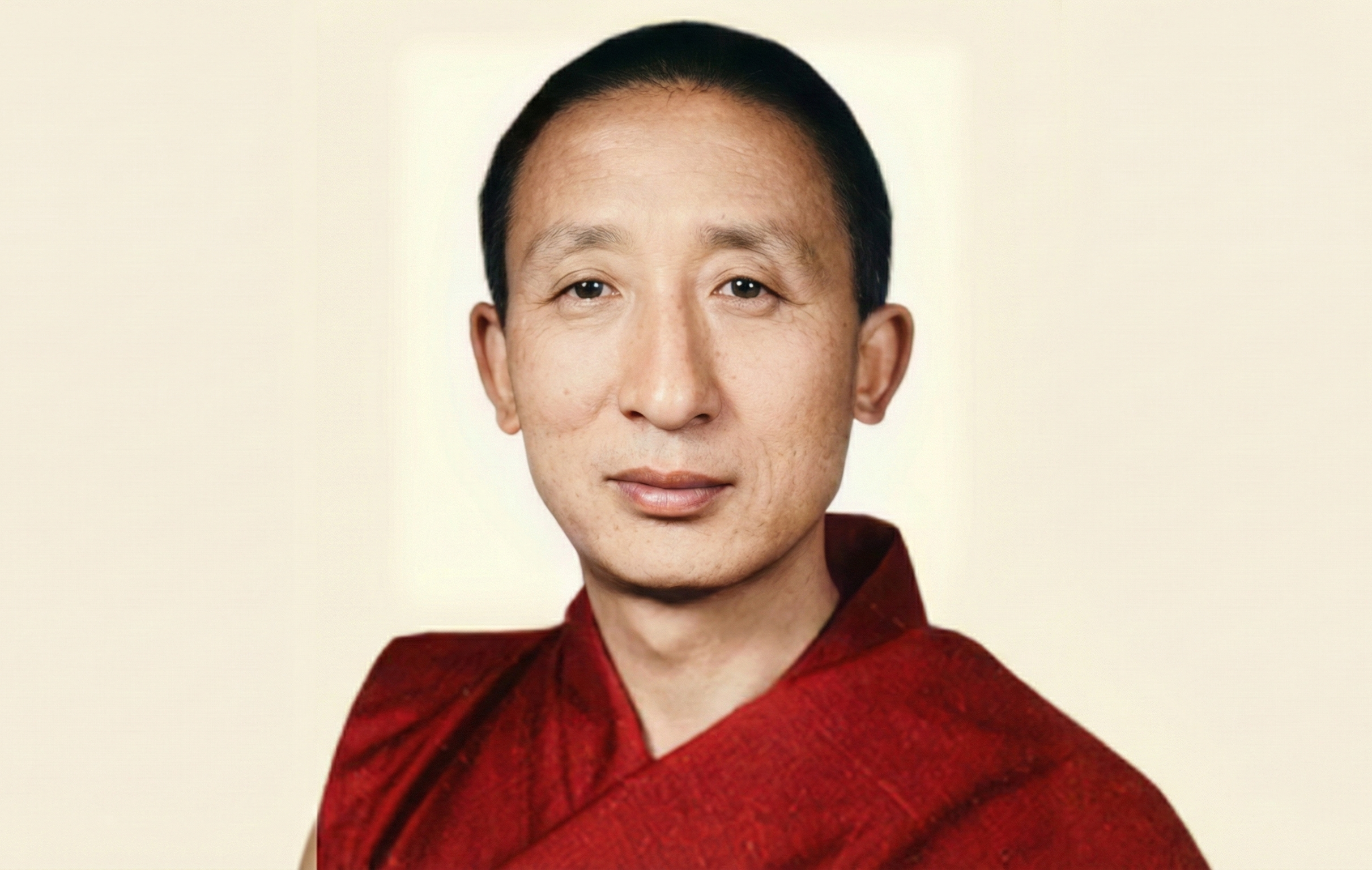
Refine Picture of Alag Jigme Lhundub la, original photo is in Tibetan Parliament website.

=== Early life and recognition as Jigme Tulku ===
Alak Jigme Thinley Lhundup was born in 1939 at Rebkong, Amdo, Tibet and raised there. Kasur Alak Jigme was recognised as the reincarnation of Jigme Rinpoche of the Rebkong Ringpo Monastery at the age of 7.

=== Monastic life in Lhasa and escape to India ===
While on a pilgrimage to Lhasa in 1955 to seek audiences with HH 14th Dalai Lama and the 10th Panchen Lama, Lhundup joined the Gaden Jangtse Monastery as a novice monk on the advice of the 14th Dalai Lama. Following the occupation of Tibet, in April 1959 Alak Jigme escaped through Bhutan into exile to India. He received numerous teachings from various teachers including from the abbots of Sera, Gaden and Drepung monasteries at the Tibetan transit camp in Buxar.

=== Member of the Tibetan Parliament-in-Exile and the Central Tibet Administration ===
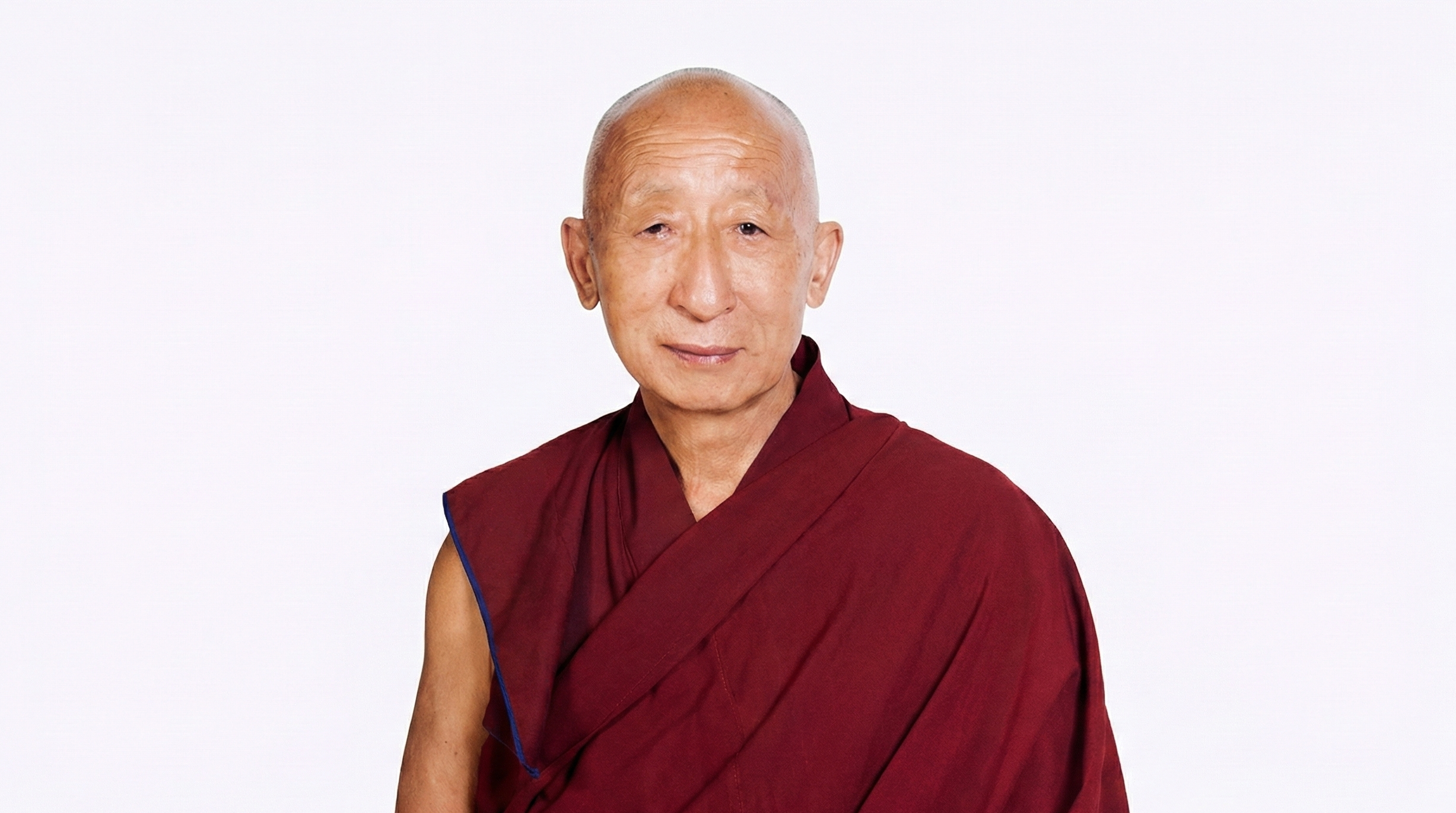
Alag Jigme Lhundup a former Auditor General of Central Tibetan Administration

In the year 1966, Alak Rinpoche served as a Domey member of the 3rd Commission of Tibetan People’s Deputies (CTPD). Then he was elected to the 4th, 5th and 6th CTPD. He was also the Vice Chairman of the 5th CTPD and the Chairman of the 6th CTPD. He served as a CTPD member for 13 years until 1979. In 1979, coincident with his resignation from the position of Speaker, He was appointed as the director of the Audit General of the Central Tibetan Administration at the rank of secretary in 1980 while also serving as the chairman of the Public Service Commission. During that time, he expanded the Audit Office, and without limiting the auditing to the expenditures of the Tibetan Government- in exile alone, he was able to initiate auditing for registered autonomous organization under the jurisdiction of the Tibetan Government-in exile, such as Tibetan cooperatives, Tibetan schools, hospitals, Library of Tibetan Works and Archives, and other such institutions. In 1985 he visited Tibet as Vice-chairman of the 4th fact-finding Tibetan delegation. Lhundup Rinpoche was appointed as an advisor to the Kalon and later appointed as Kalon for the Department of Home, a post which he held until 1990. Lhundup Rinpoche continued to serve as the Auditor General, after being directly appointed by the 14th Dalai Lama in 1996 accordance with Article 107 of the Charter, until his retirement in 2004 at the age of 65.

On occasion of the celebration of the Dalai Lama's 76th birthday in Washington, D.C., Alak Jigme Lhundup presented the first copy of a book titled "Jigten Migpe" featuring a comprehensive collection of photos showing the Dalai Lama's life, published by Dhomey Tsengol Dhengyab Nadel.

== Death ==
Kasur Alak Jigme Lhundup Rinpoche died on 26 July 2012 around 2:15 pm at the Shree Balaji Hospital in Himachal Pradesh's Kangra district near Dharamshala at the age of 73. As a mark of respect, the Central Tibetan Administration's departments and offices in Dharamsala remained closed for half a day, and the Tibetan exile government held an hour-long prayer session in the afternoon on 28 July 2012. Senior officials of the exile Tibetan administration, including Chief Justice Commissioner, Speaker of Tibetan Parliament in Exile, Prime Minister and members of the cabinet minister, and staff members attended the prayer session held at Gangchen Kyishong. Prime Minister Lobsang Sangay expressed his condolences and paid respect to Alak Jigme. At his residence, Kirti Rinpoche, the head of the Kirti Monastery and the Tibetan monks said prayers for the deceased who was cremated on 30 July 2012 in Dharamsala.
