= List of Christian schools in India =

This list of Christian schools in India contains schools from all the Christian denominations.

== Andhra Pradesh ==
- Loyola Public School
- Timpany School

== Assam ==
- Don Bosco High School, Guwahati, Assam

== Bihar ==
- Don Bosco Academy, Patna
- Loyola High School, Patna
- Nazareth Academy, Gaya
- Notre Dame Academy, Patna
- St. Joseph's Convent High School, Patna
- St. Michael's High School, Patna
- St. Xavier's High School, Patna
- St. Xavier's Higher Secondary School, Bettiah
- Watson High School, Madhubani

== Goa ==
- Loyola High School (Goa)
- Mount Mary's Higher Secondary School
- Regina Martyrum High School
- SFX High School, Goa
- St. Britto High School, Mapusa
- St. Mary's Convent High School, Goa
- St. Xavier's High School, Velim

== Gujarat ==
- St. Xavier's High School, Gandhinagar
- St. Xavier's High School, Mirzapur
- St. Xavier's High School, Surat

== Haryana ==
- St. Crispin's Senior Secondary School

== Himachal Pradesh ==
- Auckland House School, Shimla
- Bishop Cotton School (Shimla)
- Convent of Jesus and Mary, Shimla
- The Lawrence School, Sanawar
- Loreto Convent, Tara Hall, Shimla
- St. Edward's School, Shimla

== Jammu and Kashmir ==
- Burn Hall School
- Mallinson Girls School
- Presentation Convent Higher Secondary School, Srinagar
- St. Joseph's Higher Secondary School, Baramulla
- St. Peter's High School, Jammu
- Tyndale Biscoe School

== Jharkhand ==
- Bishop Westcott Boys' School
- Bishop Westcott Girls' School
- Carmel Junior College
- Carmel School, Madhupur
- Carmel School, Giridih
- De Nobili School, CMRI
- Loyola School, Jamshedpur
- Sacred Heart Convent School (Jamshedpur)
- St. John's High School, Ranchi
- St. Thomas School, Ranchi
- St. Xavier's School, Hazaribagh
- St. Xavier's School (Bokaro)
- St. Xavier's School, Ranchi

== Karnataka ==
=== Bengaluru ===
- Baldwin Boys' High School
- Baldwin Girls' High School
- Bethany High
- Bishop Cotton Boys' School
- Bishop Cotton Girls' School
- Cathedral High School, Bengaluru
- Clarence High School (India)
- Goodwill's Girls' School, Bengaluru
- Sophia High School
- St. Germain High School
- St. John's High School, Bengaluru
- St Joseph's Boys' High School, Bengaluru
- St. Joseph's Indian High School
- The Frank Anthony Public School, Bengaluru
- United Mission School

=== Mangalore ===
- Basel Evangelical School
- Carmel School
- Lourdes Central School
- Milagres School
- Mount Carmel Central School
- Rosario High School
- Sacred Hearts' School
- St. Agnes School
- St.Aloysious School
- St. Gerosa High School
- St Theresa’s School

=== Other places in Karnataka ===
- St. Mary's School, Belgaum
- St. Paul's High School, Belgaum

== Kerala ==
- Christ Nagar School, Thiruvananthapuram
- Little Flower Convent Higher Secondary School, Irinjalakuda
- Loyola School, Thiruvananthapuram
- Mar Athanasius Memorial Higher Secondary School, Puthencruz
- Mount Carmel Convent Anglo-Indian Girls High School
- Nirmala Bhavan Higher Secondary School
- St. Augustine's Higher Secondary School, Karimkunnam
- St John De Britto Anglo-Indian High School, Fort Kochi
- St. Joseph's Boys' Higher Secondary School, Kozhikode
- St. Joseph's Higher Secondary School, Thiruvananthapuram
- St. Mary's Higher Secondary School, Thiruvananthapuram
- St. Thomas Higher Secondary School, Kozhencherry
- St. Thomas School, Thiruvananthapuram

== Madhya Pradesh ==
- Campion School, Bhopal
- Christ Church Boys' Senior Secondary School
- St. Aloysius Senior Secondary School, Jabalpur
- St. Joseph's Convent Girls' Senior Secondary School
- St. Raphael's Girls' Higher Secondary School

== Maharashtra ==
- Barnes School
- The Bishop's School, Pune
- Bombay Scottish School, Mahim
- Bombay Scottish School, Powai
- Campion School, Mumbai
- Cathedral and John Connon School
- Cathedral Vidya School (Lonavala)
- Christ Church School
- Don Bosco High School, Matunga
- Dr. Antonio Da Silva High School and Junior College of Commerce
- Fort Convent School, Mumbai
- Fr. Agnel Multipurpose School and Junior College
- Holy Cross Convent High School, Thane
- Holy Family High School (Mumbai)
- Hutchings High School
- Mount Carmel Convent School (Pune)
- Our Lady of Perpetual Succour High School
- Queen Mary School, Mumbai
- St. Anne's School (Pune)
- Saint Francis D'Assisi High School
- St. Francis De'Sales High School, Nagpur, Maharashtra
- St. John the Baptist High School, Thane
- St Joseph's Boys' High School, Pune
- St. Joseph's Convent School, Panchgani
- St. Joseph's Technical Institute, Pune
- St. Mary's High School SSC
- St. Mary's School, Pune
- St. Mary's School, Mumbai
- St. Peter's School, Panchgani
- St. Stanislaus High School
- St. Teresa's High School, Charni Road
- St. Vincent's High School
- St. Xavier's Boys' Academy, Mumbai
- St. Xavier's High School, Fort
- St. Xavier's School, Kolhapur

== Manipur ==
- Don Bosco College, Maram
- Don Bosco High School (Imphal)
- Little Flower School, Imphal
- St. Joseph's School, Imphal

== Meghalaya ==
- Christian Girls' Higher Secondary School, Tura
- Don Bosco Technical School, Shillong
- St. Anthony's Higher Secondary School, Shillong

== Mizoram ==
- Bethel Mission School

== Nagaland ==
- Edith Douglas Higher Secondary School

== Odisha ==
- St. Mary's Higher Secondary School, Jharsuguda
- St. Mary's School, Jajpur Road, Odisha
- Stewart School, Cuttack

== Punjab ==
- Christ Jyoti Convent School, Sultanpur Lodhi
- Our Lady of Fatima Convent High School

== Rajasthan ==
- St. Xavier's School, Behror
- St Xavier's School, Jaipur

== Tamil Nadu ==
- Avila Convent
- Bentinck School, Vepery
- Breeks Memorial School
- C.S.I. Ewart Matriculation Higher Secondary School
- Campion Anglo-Indian Higher Secondary School
- Carmel Higher Secondary School
- Christ Church Anglo-Indian Higher Secondary School
- Hebron School
- The Laidlaw Memorial School and Junior College, Ketti
- M. C. C. Higher Secondary School
- Montfort School, Yercaud
- Sacred Heart Matriculation School
- St. Antony's Higher Secondary School (Thanjavur)
- St. Bede's Anglo Indian Higher Secondary School
- St. George's School, Chennai
- St. Ignatius' Convent Higher Secondary School
- St. Johns Vestry Anglo Indian Higher Secondary School
- St. Joseph's Anglo-Indian Higher Secondary School
- St Joseph's Higher Secondary School, Cuddalore
- St. Joseph's Higher Secondary School, Ooty
- St. Joseph's School, Trichy
- St. Kevin's Anglo Indian Higher Secondary School
- St. Mary's Anglo-Indian Higher Secondary School
- St. Patrick's Anglo Indian Higher Secondary School
- St. Theresa's Girls' Higher Secondary School
- St. Xavier's Higher Secondary School, Palayamkottai
- St. Xavier's Higher Secondary School, Thoothukudi

== Telangana ==
- All Saints High School
- Little Flower High School, Hyderabad
- Loyola Academy, Secunderabad
- St. Andrews School (India)
- St. Ann's High School, Secunderabad
- St. Gabriel's High School
- St. George's Grammar School (Hyderabad)
- St Joseph's Convent High School, Adilabad
- St Joseph's High School, Trimulgherry
- St. Patrick's High School, Secunderabad
- St. Paul's High School, Hyderabad
- St. Thomas (SPG) Boys' High School

== Uttar Pradesh ==
- Bethany Convent School, Greater Noida
- Hartmann College, Bareilly
- Ingraham Institute, Ghaziabad
- Loreto Convent, Lucknow
- Methodist High School, Kanpur
- Our Lady of Fatima Senior Secondary School, Aligarh
- St. Agnes' Loreto Day School, Lucknow
- St. Mary's Convent Inter College, Prayagraj
- St. Peter's College, Agra

== Uttarakhand ==
- Convent of Jesus and Mary, Mussoorie
- St Joseph's Academy, Dehradun
- St. Mary's Convent High School, Nainital
- Woodstock School

== West Bengal ==
- Calcutta Boys' School
- Calcutta Girls' High School
- Don Bosco High & Technical School, Liluah
- Don Bosco Bandel
- Don Bosco School, Park Circus
- Dr. Graham's Homes
- Goethals Memorial School
- Grace Ling Liang English School
- Holy Child Institute
- La Martinière Calcutta
- Loreto Convent, Asansol
- Loreto Convent, Darjeeling
- Loreto Schools, Kolkata
- Mount Hermon School, Darjeeling
- Our Lady Queen of the Missions School
- Scottish Church Collegiate School
- Scottish Church College
- St. James' School (Kolkata)
- St. John's Diocesan Girls' Higher Secondary School
- St Joseph's Convent, Chandannagar
- St. Joseph's School, Darjeeling
- St. Lawrence High School, Kolkata
- St. Paul's School, Darjeeling
- St. Patrick's Higher Secondary School
- St. Thomas' Church School, Howrah
- St. Thomas' School, Kolkata
- St. Xavier's School, Durgapur
- St. Xavier's School, Burdwan
- St. Xavier's Collegiate School

== Union territories ==
=== Chandigarh ===
- Chandigarh Baptist School
- St. Anne's Convent School, Chandigarh
- St. John's High School, Chandigarh
- St. Stephen's School, Chandigarh

=== National Capital Territory of Delhi ===
- Fr. Agnel School, Delhi
- Mount Carmel School
- Mount St Mary's School (New Delhi)
- St. Columba's School, Delhi
- St. Francis De Sales School (New Delhi)
- St. Paul's School, Delhi
- St. Thomas' School (New Delhi)
- St. Xavier's Senior Secondary School, Delhi
- St. Xavier's School, Rohini

=== Pondicherry ===
- Petit Seminaire Higher Secondary School

== National chains ==
- Carmel Convent School - 21 branches
- St. Johns Educational Trust- 7 schools

== See also ==
- List of schools in India
- Category:Catholic schools in India
- Category:Catholic secondary schools in India
