= List of schools in Chandigarh =

There are a total of 111 government schools in Chandigarh (Primary-3, Middle-10, High School-56, Senior Secondary-42), 7 aided schools, 49 recognized Senior Secondary private schools, 11 recognized private High Schools, 13 recognized private Middle Schools, 5 recognized private primary schools, 3 recognized private pre-primary and 3 recognized private play schools. ( Total of 84 Private Schools )

Notable schools in Chandigarh include:

- Chandigarh Baptist School, Sector 45D, Chandigarh
- Government Model High School, Sector 25, Chandigarh
- Government Model Senior Secondary School, Sector 16, Chandigarh
- Jawahar Navodaya Vidyalaya, Sector 25 West, Chandigarh
- St. Anne's Convent School, Sector 32D, Chandigarh
- St. John's High School, Sector 26, Chandigarh
- St. Kabir Public School, Sector 26, Chandigarh
- St. Stephen's School, Sector 45B, Chandigarh
- Strawberry Fields High School, Sector 26, Chandigarh
- Vatika High School for Deaf & Dumb, Sector 19B, Opposite Main Bazaar, Chandigarh

== See also ==
- List of schools in India
- List of institutions of higher education in Chandigarh
