= B K Model High School =

Location
- Belagavi, Karnataka; India
- Coordinates: 15°51′4″N 74°30′30″E

Information
- Grades: 10 th (SSLC)
- Campus: Camp, Belagavi

B K Model High School is a co-educational school located in the Cantonment area in Belagavi, near the Head Post Office of Belagavi, India and is regulated and supervised by Karnataka Secondary Education Examination Board. Near by educational institutions are St Mary's High School, and St. Paul's High School.

== Academic standing ==
=== Co curricular activities ===
B K Model hosted State Science Exhibition, 2015, where students from primary schools and high schools participating, organized by Department of Science and Technology, New Delhi; Directorate of State Educational Research and Training; Belagavi Zilla Panchayat; and Department of Public Instruction. BK Model High School Ground was host of Belgaum Home Minister, 2018 contest organized by Niyati Foundation, an NGO, where Sonali Kulkarni was a guest.

== Notable alumni ==
- Malhar Bhatt Joshi, cinematographer in the South Indian film industry.
