= Panchavati (disambiguation) =

Panchavati is a sacred place near modern-day Nasik in Maharashtra, India.

Panchavati or Panchvati may also refer to:

- Panchavati, groves of five sacred trees
  - Sacred groves of India
  - Panchavati Vatika
- Panchavati High School, an educational institution in Secunderabad, Telangana, India
- 7, Race Course Road, the residence of the prime minister of India in New Delhi, India
- Panchavati, a village in Rivière du Rempart District, Mauritius
- Panchavati, a 1986 film with Suresh Oberoi
- Panchvati, a 1990 film directed by Dinesh Thakur
- "Panchavati", a 1925 poem by Indian poet Maithilisharan Gupt

== See also ==
- Panchvati Express, an Indian train service that connects Mumbai with Manmad
