= PSEB =

PSEB may refer to:

- UDP-N-acetylglucosamine 4,6-dehydratase (configuration-inverting), an enzyme
- Punjab School Education Board
- Pakistan Software Export Board
- Punjab State Electricity Board
