= Patiala School for the Deaf-blind =

Location
- Village Saifdipur, Behind Punjabi University; Patiala, Panjab, 147001; India

Information
- School type: Special school
- Established: 26 January 2011
- Status: Open
- Classes: 1st–10th
- Affiliations: PSEB
- Manager: Society for Welfare of the Handicapped
- Website: www.patialaschool.org

Patiala School for the Deaf-blind is a special school for deaf-blind children, or multiple disabilities, in Patiala city of Panjab. Society for Welfare of the Handicapped started the school in 2011.

The school is the 3rd of its kind in India.

== See also ==
- Mahant Gurbanta Das School for Deaf & Dumb, Bathinda
- Vatika High School for Deaf & Dumb, Chandigarh
- Patiala School for the Deaf
- Patiala School for the Blind
- Umeed Red Cross School for Hearing Impaired, Faridkot
- Khosla School for the Deaf, Jalandhar
- School for Deaf, Barnala
