= Patiala School for the Blind =

Location
- Village Saifdipur, Behind Punjabi University; Patiala, Panjab, 147001; India; 30.370893°N 76.449807°E

Information
- School type: Special school
- Established: 1967
- Status: Open
- Enrollment: 60
- Classes: Pre-nursery–12th
- Affiliations: PSEB
- Manager: Society for Welfare of the Handicapped
- Website: www.patialaschool.org

Patiala School for the Blind is a special school for blind children in Patiala city of Panjab. Society for Welfare of the Handicapped started the school in 1967.

The school charges no fees from the students and server from pre-nursery to 12th class. This and Patiala School for the Deaf together have 200 children of which 140 are the deaf and 60 are the blind. Hostel facility is also provided free of cost and currently, 180 students are staying in the hostel. The school also provides uniforms, stationery, meals and others free of cost.

== See also ==
- Mahant Gurbanta Das School for Deaf & Dumb, Bathinda
- Vatika High School for Deaf & Dumb, Chandigarh
- Patiala School for the Deaf
- Patiala School for the Deaf-blind
- Umeed Red Cross School for Hearing Impaired, Faridkot
- Khosla School for the Deaf, Jalandhar
- School for Deaf, Barnala
