= St. Mary's School, Jajpur Road, Odisha =

Coordinates: 20.963807°N 86.124860°E

St. Mary's Senior Secondary School
- Jajpur Road, Odisha

Information
- Type: Missionary
- Established: 1976; 50 years ago
- Founder: Roman Catholic Archdiocese of Cuttack-Bhubaneswar
- Principal: Sr. Mary Lina DungDung
- Gender: Co-education
- Classes offered: Nursery to 12th
- Language: English
- Campus: Urban
- Publication: Excelsior
- Yearbook: Marian's Matrix
- Affiliation: Council for the Indian School Certificate Examination
- Website: stmarysjajpurroad.com

St. Mary's Senior Secondary School is a co-educational English medium school established in 1976. It is located at Jajpur Road, Odisha, India. The school is dedicated to the divine patronage of Mary. It is an institution managed by the Cuttack Roman Catholic Diocesan Corporation, and administered by the Nuns of Franciscan Handmaids of Mary. The school is affiliated to the Council for the Indian School Certificate Examinations.

The school organizes the annual Tarun Memorial Cricket Tournament, named after a student of the school, late Tarun Samal.

== See also ==
- List of Christian schools in India
- List of schools in India
