= St. Anthony's Senior Secondary School =

St. Anthony's Senior Secondary School may refer to several schools in India:

- St. Anthony's Senior Secondary School, Udaipur
- St. Anthony’s Higher Secondary School, Shillong
