= List of institutions of higher education in Chandigarh =

The educational institutions of Chandigarh include several types of universities and colleges located in the Chandigarh union territory of India.

== Universities ==
In Chandigarh there is one state university, one private university, one deemed and one public university.

Universities of Chandigarh
University	Location	Type	Established	Specialisation	Sources
Panjab University	Chandigarh	State	1882 (1956^{‡})	General	
Punjab Engineering College	Chandigarh	Deemed	1921 (1954^{‡}) (2003^{†})	Technology	
Postgraduate Institute of Medical Education and Research	Chandigarh	Deemed	1962	Health	
Narsee Monjee Institute of Management Studies	Chandigarh	Deemed	2021	Management, Law	
Indira Gandhi National Open University	Chandigarh	Public	1985	General	

^{‡} relocated to Chandigarh
^{†} granted deemed university status

== Colleges ==
- Chandigarh College of Architecture
- Chandigarh College of Engineering and Technology
- DAV College
- Goswami Ganesh Dutta Sanatan Dharma College
- Government College of Art
- Government College of Commerce and Business Administration
- Government College of Education, Chandigarh
- Government Medical College and Hospital
- Indo Global Colleges
- Indo-Swiss Training Centre
- Institute of Microbial Technology

- Dev Samaj College of Education
- Dev Samaj College for Women
- Dr. Ambedkar Institute of Hotel Management, Catering and Nutrition
- Dr. Harvansh Singh Judge Institute of Dental Sciences & Hospital
- Government College for Girls, Chandigarh
- Government College of Yoga Education and Health
- Government Home Science College
- Government Rehabilitation Institute for Intellectual Disabilities
- Guru Gobind Singh College for Women
- Homoepathic Medical College & Hospital
- Indian Institute of Fashion and Design - (IIFD)
- Institute for the Blind, Chandigarh
- Mehr Chand Mahajan DAV College for Women
- National Institute of Technical Teachers Training & Research
- Post Graduate Government College – 11
- Post Graduate Government College – 46
- Post Graduate Government College for Girls
- Regional Institute of English
- Shri Dhanwantri Ayurvedic College & Hospital
- Universal Institute of Nursing
- Universal Institute of Engineering Technology
- Universal Group Of Institutions

== See also ==
- List of educational institutions in Mohali
- List of schools in India
