= St. Mary's School, Belgaum =

St. Mary's High School

Location
- Belagavi, Karnataka; India; 15°51′13″N 74°30′38″E

Information
- Type: Coed
- Motto: Serve God in man.
- Established: 1851; 175 years ago
- Headmaster: Philips Alvaris
- Grades: LKG-10 (SSLC)
- Enrollment: 2496
- Campus: BC No.145, Camp, Belagavi - 590001
- Area: 2.08 Acres
- Website: stmarysbgm.com

St. Mary's High School is a co-educational school located in the Cantonment area in Belagavi, near the Head Post Office of Belagavi, India and is regulated and supervised by Karnataka Secondary Education Examination Board. It was founded in 1851. Near by educational institutions are Islamiya College and B K Model High School.

== History ==
St. Mary's High School was established in the year 1851 mainly for the children of the British soldiers with 4 pupils then, in 1947 for Anglo-Indians and in 1958 for purely Resident Indian. Late Guruprem D. David served as Principal for four decades. Mangal is presently working as Principal, succeeding Jasmine Rubdi.

Satyajit Ray's Apu Trilogy featured in the Film Festival held on 15 August 1984 at St. Mary's High School, Belgaum.

== Academic standing ==
=== Co curricular activities ===
Students participate in Karnataka Talent Search Examination, All India General Knowledge Test, Karnataka Red Cross Examination, Karnataka Drawing Lower and Higher Grade Examination, Hindi ( हिंदी ) Examination I, II, III conducted by Hindi school of Bombay, Kannada ( ಕನ್ನಡ ) : I, II, III by Vishwa Vidya Sadan Trust, Bangalore, Mathematics and Science by National Talent Search Examination, Delhi, ANNUAL ALL INDIA UN INFORMATION TEST and poetry.

The school also has The School Parliament, Literary Association, Children's Art, Photographic, The Science and Nature Club respectively; and an Interact Club under Rotary Club of Belgaum which is student organisation, where students take part as organisers of inter school events.

Students can also be member of National Cadet Corps (NCC).

=== Scholarships ===
Few scholarships provided are - Shri Deepak Santosh Sing Chandalia, Krisnarajira Javalkar, Yashwantrao N. H. Hangirrgekar, Hemandra Turakhia, Mrs. Manorama P. Shenoy and Shantappa Maroor; and Late Dr. N. R. Kulkarni , Master Hemant M. Sanzgiri Memorial, Sub Krishnarao Balawant Sawalekar, Ajit Banahatti, Ramachnadra Chate, Smt. Manorma Pise, Tejas N. Shanbhag, Smt. Neelamma Mahadevappa Hugar, Rev A. V. Rubdi, Mr H. S. Johnson, Ms. S. A. Rubdi, Naveen Kamble, Sri Ajit Vamanrao Jadhav scholarships respectively.

== House system ==
Students are divided into four Houses namely Yellow, Green, Blue, and Red. Each house colour is depicted on the student's uniform as a badge. They are led by four house leaders.

== (Graduating) Passing Out parade ==
The SSLC students ( who will be completing grade 10 public examination commonly referred to as 'class 10 board examinations' ) march for the last time with lamps.

== Sports ==
Annual intra house sports event are organised. Students also participate in events of Cricket, Table Tennis, Football with frequent participation in Royceton Memorial Trophy (under 14) which is organised by St. Paul's School, Belgaum , Swimming and Skating.

== Notable alumni ==
- Late Amin Kittur, trekker, Best National Cadet Corps (NCC) Cadet - awarded by former prime minister Atal Bihari Vajpayee during Republic Day Parade at New Delhi.
- Ameet Joshi
- Dr. Ameet Patil
- Amankumar Paragi
- Shailesh Sharad Joshi, Amrut Pharmaceuticals
- Sanatkumar Kagwad
- Sourabh Potdar
- Sudharm Mudalgi
- Arun Agarwal
- Yash Kusane, swimmer
- Ashok Lohar
- Amit Shejekan
