= St. Theresa's School, Bendur =

St Theresa’s School
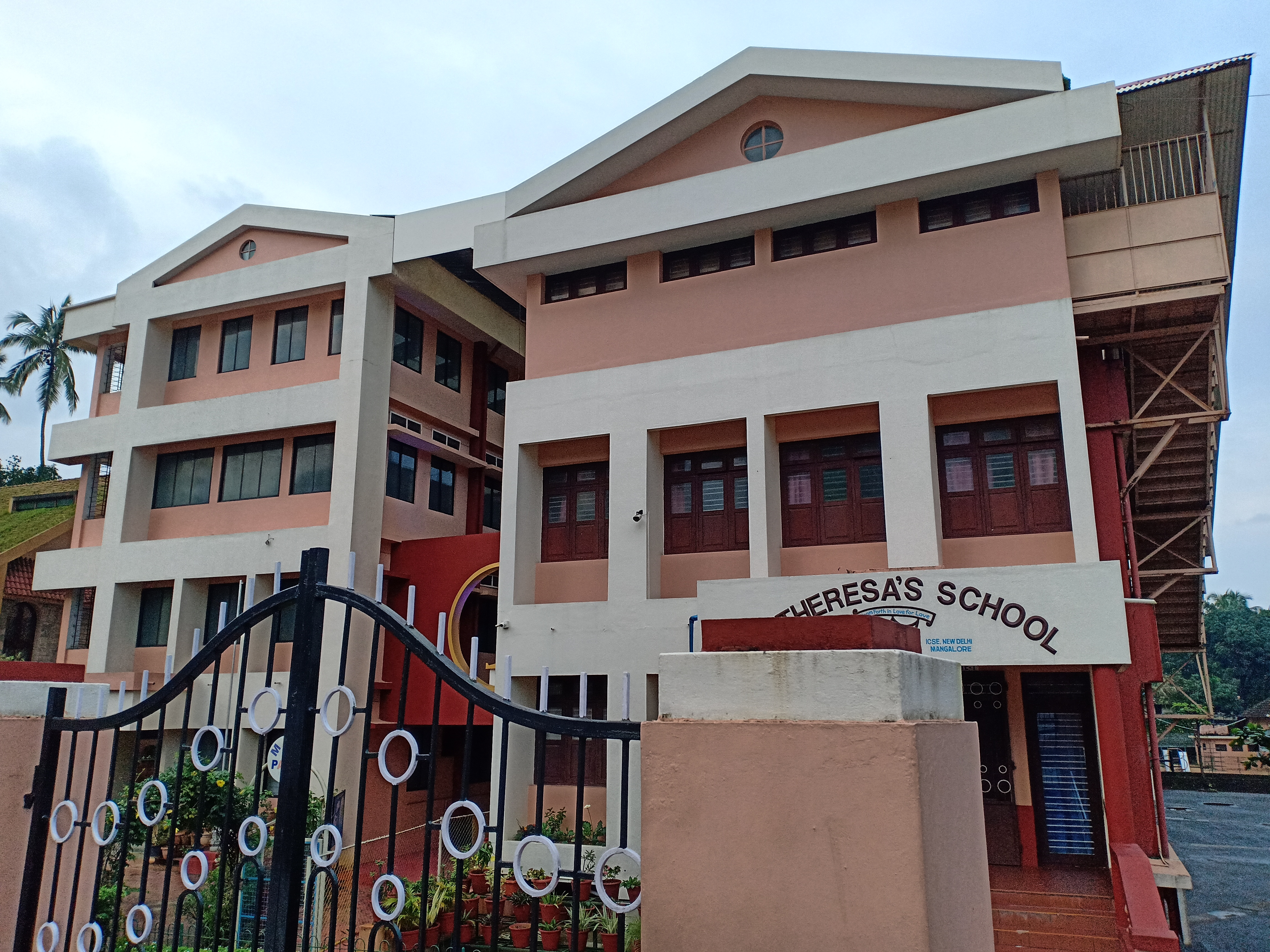

Location
- Bethany Institution, Bendoor; Mangaluru, Karnataka, 575002; India; 12.861894°N 74.837524°E

Information
- Type: Private school
- Motto: Bloom forth in Love For Love
- Religious affiliation: Catholic
- Patron saint: St. Theresa
- Established: 1996
- Founder: Msgr. R.F.C. Mascarenhas
- Grades: 1 to 10

St. Theresa's School is a Christian religious minority institution located in Bendur, Mangaluru, India. The school is managed by the Bethany Congregation nuns and is affiliated with the Council for the Indian School Certificate Examinations. It is known to be the only CICSE school in the city of Mangaluru. This institution was established on 17 June 1996.

== Facilities and associations ==
This various facilities provided by this school are

- Artificial intelligence lab
- Computer Lab
- Physics Lab
- AI lab
- Chemistry Lab
- Biology Lab
- Indoor Stadium
- Playground
- Kids park
- Music room
- Dance room
- Math park
- NCC shooting range
- library
- auditorium
- cricket, Football, Basketball, Badminton and volley ball kabaddi pickle ball grounds
- auditorium

The various associations in this school include

- National Cadet Corps
- Little Way Association
- Parent Teacher Association
- Road safety patrol
- St. Theresa's school band
- Alumni Association
- Young student movement

classes

- KG:
  - PKG - pre kindergarten
  - LKG - lower kindergarten
  - UKG - upper kintergarten
- primary:
  - 1st grade
  - 2nd grade
  - 3rd grade
  - 4th grade
  - 5th grade
- middle school:
  - 6th grade
  - 7th grade
  - 8th grade
- high school:
  - 9th grade
  - 10th grade
- college:
  - 1st PUC

== See also ==
- List of schools in India
- List of Christian schools in India
