= Bishop Westcott Girls' School =

Information
- Religious affiliation: Church of North India
- Established: 1921; 105 years ago
- Founder: Foss Westcott
- Gender: Girls
- Enrollment: c.2000
- Affiliation: Council for the Indian School Certificate Examinations

Bishop Westcott Girls' School is a school located in Namkum, Ranchi, Jharkhand. It was founded by Foss Westcott in 1921. Formerly an Anglican school, it now belongs to the Church of North India. An English-medium school affiliated to the Council for the Indian School Certificate Examinations (CISCE), the school boasts over 2,000 students from various communities, as boarders and day-scholars. It is situated 7 kilometers from Ranchi on the Chota Nagpur Plateau, at an altitude of 2,000 ft (610 m) in Namkum.

== History and origins ==
The school was established in 1921, by Dr. Foss Westcott who wanted to create a space for Anglo-Indian students. Primarily, the school would employ nuns to preach the word of God but transitioned to a secular model of teaching after the Independence of India due to an influx of students from Bihar. The school is situated near an army base in Namkum. The school is limited to a higher school model, which in India is considered to be the tenth standard or the second year. The structure of the school is divided into four bases or the four 'blocks'; the first of which is the primary block for students aged 5–8, the second of which is for students ages 8–12, the third of which is for students 12–15, and the final of which is for extra-curricular activities. Between the four 'blocks', a number of other designated spaces have been assigned such as a 'Sick Room', a library, a dining hall, and hosteller accommodations.

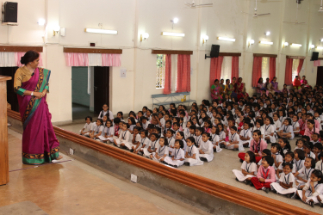
Principal N. Jacobs

== Students and faculty ==
While not much is known about the students or faculty of the school, there are an estimated 2,000 students attending the day school with about 500 students in the boarding school. The school has three houses: Faith, Peace, and Joy. This corresponds to Bishop Westcott Boys' School, part of the franchise of Bishop schools. The motto of the school is, "Onwards and Upwards.", while the motto of the corresponding school is, "Live Not For Self Alone". The long-standing relationship between Bishop Westcott Girls' School and Bishop Westcott Boys' School was formalized in 1927 when the school was converted to a makeshift hospital to accommodate patients of World War II.

== Facilities ==
The school has an assortment of facilities ranging from kathak, music, judo, basketball court, and pianoforte. Apart from the aforementioned facilities, other facilities have not been outlined.
