= College of Commerce and Business Administration =

College of Commerce and Business Administration may refer to:

- Former name of the Culverhouse College of Business at the University of Alabama in Tuscaloosa, Alabama
- Former name of the Gies College of Business at the University of Illinois Urbana-Champaign
- City College of Commerce and Business Administration in Kolkata, India
- Goenka College of Commerce and Business Administration in Kolkata, India
- Government College of Commerce and Business Administration at Panjab University in Chandigarh, India
- Philippine College of Commerce and Business Administration, former name of the University of the East, Manila, Philippines
- University of Santo Tomas College of Commerce and Business Administration, the business school of the University of Santo Tomas in Manila, Philippines

== See also ==
- School of Commerce and Business Administration
