= Calcutta Girls' High School =

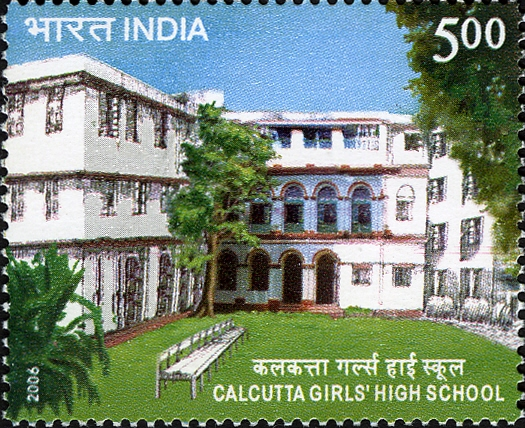
- 2006 stamp dedicated to Calcutta Girls High School

Location
- 118, Princep Street; Kolkata, West Bengal, 700071; India; 22.5684009°N 88.3528274°E

Information
- Type: Private secondary school
- Motto: Deus et Humanitas (Latin: God and Humanity)
- Established: 1856; 170 years ago
- Founder: Charles Canning, 1st Earl Canning
- School board: Indian Council of Secondary Examination
- Oversight: Calcutta Christian School Society
- Principal: Mrs. Basanti Biswas 2215-1540, 2215-2748
- Grades: Playgroup to Year 12
- Gender: Girls
- Age range: 3 to 18+
- Language: English
- Colours: Red & White
- Song: School Of Mine
- Yearbook: Kaleidoscope
- Website: cghs1856.org

Calcutta Girls' High School (abbreviated as CGHS) is a private school for girls in Kolkata, West Bengal, India.

== History ==
The school was founded in 1856, as a boarding school under the patronage of Charles Canning, 1st Earl Canning. The Methodist Church in India now manages the school. The school teaches in the English language, and teaches for the Indian School Certificate Examination (ICSE / ISC). It was supported by the Evangelical denominations of the city. In 1877, the management of the school was handed over to Bishop J. M. Thoburn of the Methodist Episcopal Church. Emma Knowles took charge in 1890. She introduced the kindergarten department and started vocal and instrumental music in 1892. In 1899, Drill classes were started by the Principal, Miss Widdifield. The school library was set up in 1901 by M. Storrs. In 1911, 16 girls appeared for the Senior Cambridge Examination, earning the school's present name. In 1914, the girls won the Lady Carmichael Trophy. In 1917, the Girl Guides from the School was the First Company to be presented with the Union Jack. In 1933, clubs for various activities were introduced; clubs included were Drama, Badminton, Arts and Crafts, Know Your City, Current Events, Piano and Harmonica, Junior Drama Clubs and the Musical Application Club.

== See also ==
- Education in India
- List of schools in India
- Education in West Bengal
