= School of Commerce and Business Administration =

School of Commerce and Business Administration may refer to:

- Former name of the Culverhouse College of Business at the University of Alabama in Tuscaloosa, Alabama
- Former name of the Jon M. Huntsman School of Business at the Utah State University in Logan, Utah

== See also ==
- College of Commerce and Business Administration
- School of Commerce and Administration, former name of the University of Chicago Booth School of Business
