= Little Flower School, Imphal =

Little Flower School

Location
- Imphal, Manipur - 795001; India; 24.784029°N 93.916540°E

Information
- Type: Missionary
- Established: 11 February 1958; 68 years ago
- Founder: Salesian Sisters
- Sister school: St. Joseph's School, Imphal
- Gender: Girls
- Classes offered: 1st to 10th
- Language: English
- Campus: Urban
- Nickname: LFS
- Affiliation: BOSEM

Little Flower School in Imphal, Manipur is a Catholic Christian Minority school run by the Roman Catholic Archdiocese of Imphal. The school was founded and established by the Salesian Sisters, Daughters of Mary Help of Christians on 10 February 1958. School started at 'Nirmalabas'. It is a Catholic school for girls only.

== History ==
Sr. Cleofe, Sr. Agnes Kurkalang, Sr. Cecilia Doyle and Sr. Mary Mascarenhas started a primary school in Imphal at a small house called "Nirmalabas". Soon a nearby land belonging to R.K. Mangessana the royal family, was bought for the school and was blessed by the late Bishop Oreste Marengo. For construction sisters from Nirmalabas would walk all the way to the site with a tiffin box, and they would remain whole day to supervise the work. The big boulders were brought from Churachandpur in the truck belonging to the Salesian fathers. Some of the funds were provided by the Congregation but to raise more funds sisters used to stitch uniforms for the students. In 1962 construction work was completed and students were transferred to the new buildings. There were 247 students and 10 boarders. School was recognized as a High School by L. Ch. Singh, Inspector of Schools, Government of Manipur on 1 November 1961. On 19 January 1966 School was recognized by the Board of Secondary Education Assam .

== Vocational School ==
In 1977, Mother Marchetti started a women's vocational school to teach tailoring, weaving and knitting to the adult women.

== See also ==
- List of Schools in India
- List of Christian Schools in India
