= St. Joseph's School, Imphal =

St. Joseph's School

Location
- Sangaiparou, Imphal, Manipur 795004; India; 24.787965°N 93.914442°E

Information
- Type: Missionary
- Motto: 'Truth and Duty'
- Religious affiliation: Roman Catholic
- Established: 1983; 43 years ago
- Founder: Fr. Mathew Planthottam
- Sister school: Little Flower School, Imphal
- Principal: Fr. Ashiho Bonio
- Gender: Boys - High School; Co-Ed - Higher Secondary
- Classes offered: 1st to 12th
- Language: English
- Campus: Urban
- Nickname: SJS
- Affiliation: BOSEM & COHSEM
- Website: http://sjsimphal.com

St. Joseph's School Imphal is a religious minority educational institution established by the Catholic Church under the Roman Catholic Archdiocese of Imphal.

== History ==
The school was founded and established in 1983 by a Roman Catholic Priest, Fr. Mathew Planthottam.

== Present ==
This school is located in Sangaiparou, Imphal, Manipur. It is a school for boys only.

Students from the school are called "Josephians" or "Josephites". It is a Roman Catholic School run by Roman Catholic Archdiocese of Imphal. The School has separate buildings for high school and higher secondary school on the same campus but High school is only for boys and higher secondary school is for co-education.

== See also ==
- List of Schools in India
- List of Christian Schools in India
