= Hutchings High School =

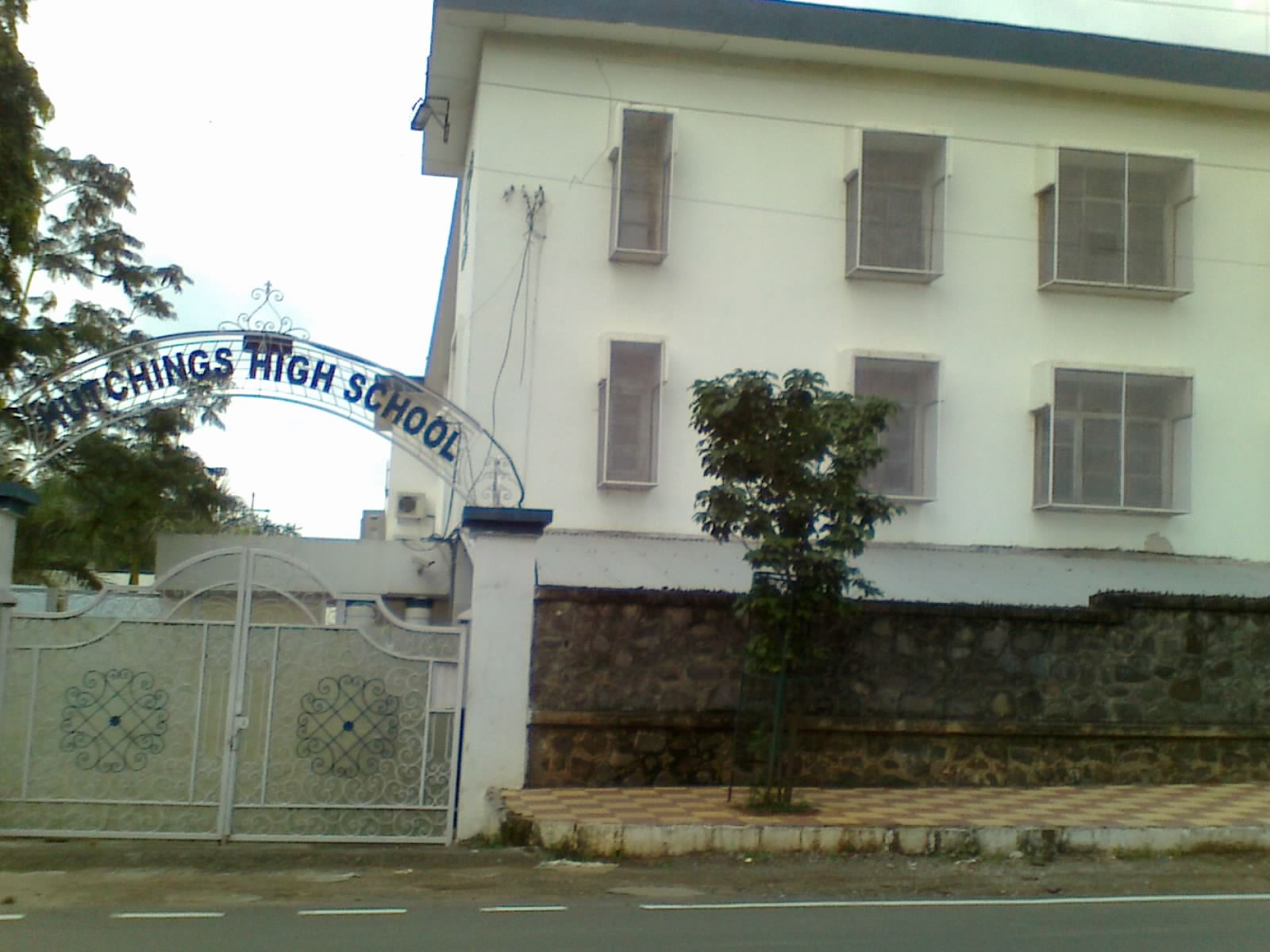

Location
- Pune, Maharashtra; India; 18.5013026°N 73.8781771°E

Information
- Type: Private unaided
- Motto: Look up Lift up
- Established: 1879
- Principal: Rita Katawati
- Color: Navy Blue
- Website: hutchingsschoolpune.in

Hutchings High School (or HHS) is a co-educational school and junior college in Pune, Maharashtra, India, with classes from pre-nursery up to class 12. It is an Anglo-India school registered since 1879. The school is affiliated to the Indian Certificate of Secondary Education board. It was started by Emily Hutchings, a missionary.

== History ==
Emily Hutchings, a missionary, arrived in Pune in 1904. She established a small school for 25 underprivileged girls and ran it for some time until funds ran out. The Bishop of the Methodist Church, William Taylor, then authorised church funds to be allocated to the school and thereafter the church became its main supporter. Hutchings died on 15 April 1942 at the age of 92. The current principal is Ms. Ritaa Katawati.

== See also ==
- List of schools in Pune
- List of Christian Schools in India
