= Bethany High =

School in Koramangala, Bangalore, South India

Coordinates: 12.940627°N 77.620805°E

Bethany High School
- Bethany High
- Koramangala; Bengaluru, Karnataka, 560095; India

Information
- School type: Private
- Motto: Trust and Obey
- Founded: 1963
- Founder: Mignon David
- School board: Indian Certificate of Secondary Education, Indian School Certificate, National Institute of Open Schooling
- School code: KA019
- Director: Dr. Akash David Ryall
- Principal: Mr. Robert Khin
- Gender: Coeducational
- Language: English
- Houses: Darell, Leonard, Satur, Mignon
- Colours: Black and Green
- Song: Trust and Obey
- Athletics: 100m, 200m, 400m, 800m, 1500m, 400m relay, high jump, long jump, shot put, javelin throw, discus throw
- Sports: Football, Cricket, Basketball, Chess, Badminton, throwball
- Website: bethanyinstitutions.edu.in

Bethany High is an ICSE and ISC affiliated school in Koramangala, Bengaluru, India.

The director of the school is Dr. Akash Ryall.

Bethany High turned 60 in 2023 and opened up a new campus on Sarjapur Road, which was inaugurated by Mahatma Gandhi's granddaughter Sumitra Kulkarni.

== Houses ==
There are four houses:

- Satur-Blue, motto "Steadfast and Sure"
- Darell-Red, motto "United in our strengths"
- Leonard-Yellow, motto "Honour at all cost"
- Mignon-Purple, motto "Abide by the truth"

== Bethany Student Organisation ==
The Bethany Student Organisation is a body of students who have been chosen to represent their school and houses:

- The School President and Vice- President; both chosen from the Junior College.
- The School Head Boy and Head Girl; both chosen from Class 10.
- The School Deputy Head Boy and Deputy Head Girl; both chosen from Class 10
- The Cultural Coordinators, both chosen from the Junior College
- The Games Captain and Vice- Captain
- Four House Captains
- Four House Vice- Captains
- Four Prefects from each house (High School)
- Two Prefects from each house (Middle School)
- One Prefect from each house (Junior College)
- 12 Literary Prefects (one each from High School, Middle School and Junior College representing their respective houses)

From 2019, the head Boy/girl and the House Captains and Vice Captains in the Sarjapur campus would be elected by the student population of the school/House. For the election of the Head Boy and Head Girl, a General election will be held whereas for the House Captains the students from the respective House only can vote. The nominees are selected by the teachers with a vote and several debates.

The Bethany Past Students Association [BPSA] consists of alumni who have excelled in various fields all over the world. The BPSA committee is currently led by C.V. Ramesh. The Vice President of the BPSA is Jim Roberts, who is the CX Worldwide Delivery Manager at Logitech. Bethany takes immense pride in the achievements of the alumni and conducts regular networking events.
