= Pre-university course =

Indian educational course

- Acronym: PUC
- Type: Pen and Paper Based Exam
- Purpose: Admission to graduate courses
- Duration: 3:30 hours (India); Time may vary in other countries
- Regions: Worldwide
- Languages: English (World); Including all Indian Languages

In the Indian education system of some Indian states, the Pre-University Course (PUC) or Pre-Degree Course (PDC) is referred to as intermediate or +2 course, which is a two-year senior secondary education course that succeeds the tenth grade (known as SSLC or SSC in such states, equivalent to sophomore in the US system) and precedes to the completion of a Senior Secondary Course. The First Year of the PUC is commonly referred to as 1st PUC or Class 11th, (known in most other Indian states as +1 or HSC corresponding to the US junior year or generally the eleventh grade), and the Second Year of the PUC as 2nd PUC or Class 12th (known in most other Indian states as +2 or HSC, corresponding to the US senior year or the twelfth grade in general). A college which offers the PUC is simply known as a 'PU college' or 'Intermediate College' which is also referred to as junior college.

A second year PUC marks card (2003) in Karnataka

In India, The national and almost all other state education boards consider education up to the Class 12th as simply "Schooling" as the education up to this class comes under school education. But in some state education boards in India consider the Classes 11th and 12th education as "PUC/PDC" or "Intermediate Course" as this course is conducted only in Junior Colleges and not in High Schools like other national and state education boards because these state education boards provide the schooling only in Class 10th. Also, this type of Junior Collegiate Education or PUC/Intermediate Course education for Senior Secondary Classes (Classes 11th-12th) exists only in the education boards of some Indian states as majority of national and state education boards provide schooling till class 12th. However, The education system across the country follows the same pattern as follows like 10 + 2 + (3, 4, or 5) pattern is followed: a bachelor's degree (of three, four, or five years) requires at least ten years of primary and secondary education in schools followed by two years of higher secondary education in Higher Secondary Schools (Majority Of National and State Education Boards) and Junior Colleges (Some State Education Boards).

The PUC certificate is a certification obtained by the Junior College students upon the successful completion of the Higher Secondary Examination at the end of study at the higher secondary level in India. The PUC Certificate is obtained on passing the "2nd PUC (Class 12th) Public Examination" which is commonly known as "Class 12th Board Examinations" in India in general. A person desiring admission to an Indian university must pass this course, which can be considered as a degree bridge course to prepare students for university education.

For example, the state of Karnataka conducts Board Examinations at the end of the 2nd Year PUC for university admissions. This has three program streams with options focusing on science, commerce and arts, respectively. Students desiring to study professional programs in Karnataka must pass the science stream of this exam and qualify through the Common Entrance Test of the state. Recently, the Karnataka PUC Board made the first-year PUC exams public, to filter out low-scoring students and improve overall average scores. Only about 60% of students usually pass the exam, and only about 1.5% score above 85% overall.

And also for The eastern Indian state of West Bengal conducts Board Examination through the West Bengal Council of Higher Secondary Educationin all over the state for admission into colleges (though for admission in Engineering, Medical, Pharmacy, Nursing and architecture students have to write the separate entrance examinations). For (BA, B.Com, B.Sc) students are admitted in the basis of their marks in +2 . According to the rule of WBCHSE those students who fail to pass the first-year of PUC will have to retake the exam the next year if they pass the exam they can enter the second year. Recently the West Bengal Council of Higher Secondary Education is very strict to its passing criteria and renewed the grading system, so nowadays even getting a First Division (60% or equivalent to B+ in new grading system for PUC) is hard for students. On an average only 10% students able get 60% or higher for the Science stream and for commerce and Arts 40% students got First Division. (according to the statistics of WBresult.2023)

== Short description ==
"Pre-University Course" (PUC) is 2-Year Senior Secondary Course and it is an intermediate level of education in the state of Karnataka, India and it collectively refers to 11th and 12th Grades officially in these states and offered in Junior Colleges or Pre-University Colleges instead of Senior Secondary Schools so only 11th and 12th grades are referred here as 1st PUC (11th Grade) and 2nd PUC (12th Grade) i.e First Year Pre-University Course and Second Year Pre-University Course respectively as they are part of Junior College system know so and the education received in Junior Colleges is equivalent to the Senior Secondary Schooling offered by CBSE and other State Boards because both provides education for 11th and 12th Grades.The PUC curriculum offers various streams or combinations of subjects such as Science (PCMB or PCMC), Commerce (CEBA), and Arts (HEBA). PUC examinations are conducted at the end of the 2nd year, and the results play a crucial role in determining students' eligibility for higher education, such as undergraduate degree programs in colleges and universities. In short 11th and 12th grades in Karnataka are part of Junior College system and not School System as Schooling stops after 10th Grade so 11th and 12th grades here are referred differently like college grades like 1st PUC and 2nd PUC because of different institutions (Junior Colleges or Pre-University Colleges) but irrespective of terminologies and institutions they are equivalent to Senior Secondary Schools and education received there and elsewhere for 11th and 12th Grades and Junior Colleges in Karnataka are affiliated to Karnataka State Board which is commonly known as KSEAB.

== Nomenclature ==
The nomenclature of 11th and 12th grade education varies across different states of India. In Karnataka, 11th and 12th grade education is known as Standard 2 Year Pre- University Course (PUC), and in Kerala, Tamil Nadu, and Maharashtra, the term used for 11th and 12th grade education is higher secondary education (HSE). In some states like Rajasthan, Delhi, Punjab, and Haryana, the term "senior secondary education" is used.In the states of Telangana, Andhra Pradesh, Uttarakhand, and Uttar Pradesh, The 11th and 12th grade education is known as intermediate education.

== Courses after PUC ==
Students who have completed the PUC in the science stream can enroll in courses such as mathematics, natural sciences, nursing, pharmacy, agriculture, engineering or medicine. They can also enroll for a pure-sciences B.Sc. Admission to these courses depends on what a student wants to do as a profession in near future or upon marks scored in PUC exams conducted by the institutes or by the state board.

Students who succeed in the commerce stream may enroll in a graduate Bachelor of Commerce or Bachelor of Business Management(also a student of science can pursue this) degree program at an Indian university.

Those who have passed the arts-stream PUC can opt to study for a Bachelor of Arts (B.A) or Diploma in Education (DEd), Bachelor of Social Work (BSW), or even Bachelor of Fine Arts - offered by The Government College of Art & Craft in Kolkata or may be admitted to vocational programs in fashion design — offered by the National Institute of Fashion Design (NIFT) — or apparel and knitwear manufacturing.

== See also ==
- Higher Secondary School Certificate
- Intermediate college
- Senior secondary education
