= St. Xavier's School, Burdwan =

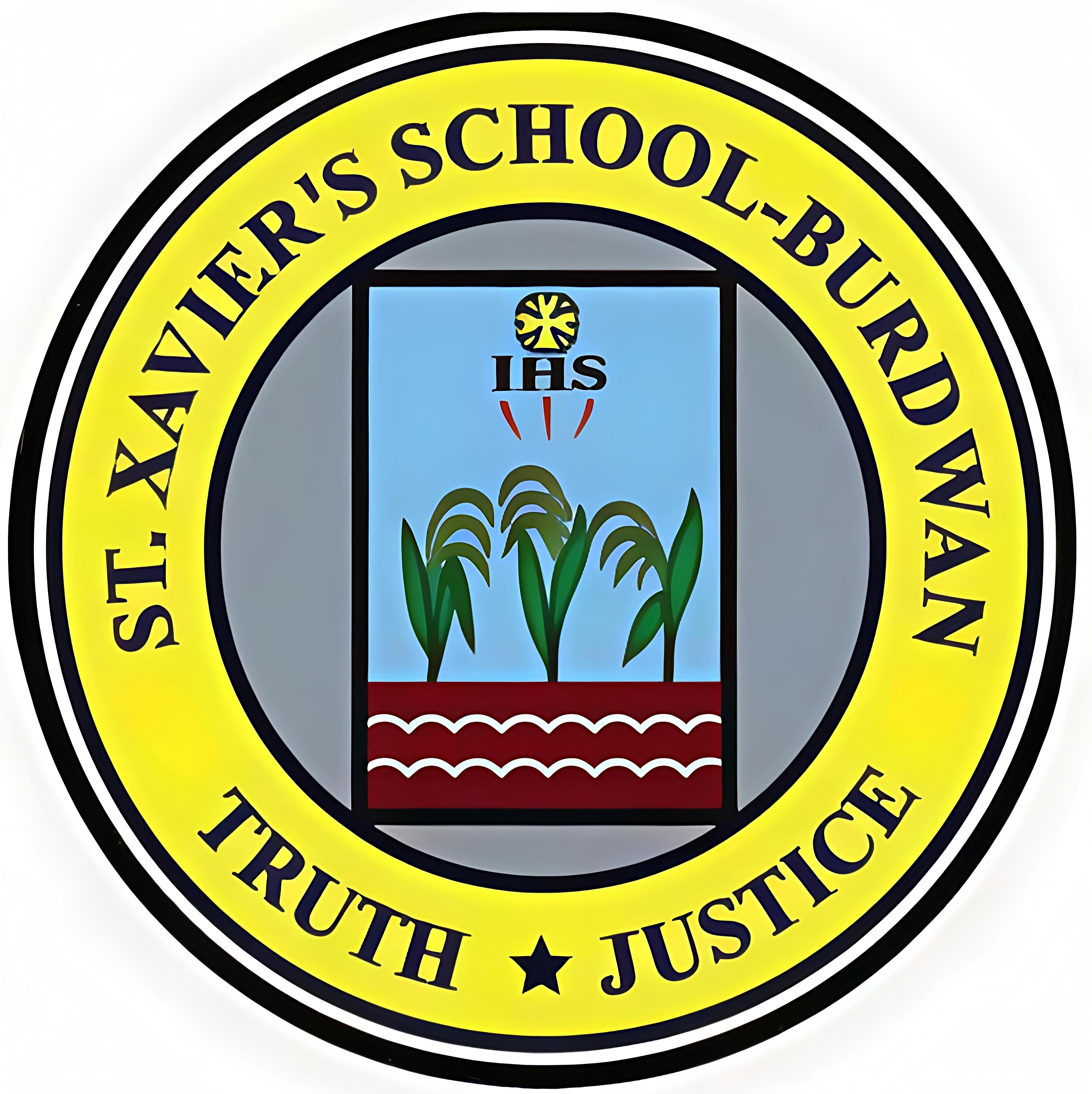

Location
- Bardhaman, West Bengal, 713101; India; 23°13′7″N 87°52′29.48″E

Information
- Type: Private primary and secondary school
- Motto: Truth and Justice
- Religious affiliation: Catholicism
- Denomination: Jesuits
- Patron saint: Saint Francis Xavier
- Established: 1964; 62 years ago
- Principal: Fr. Maria Joseph Savariappan, S.J.
- Staff: 18
- Faculty: 70
- Grades: L.K.G. to XII
- Gender: Co-educational
- Enrollment: 1,400
- Language: English
- Affiliations: Council for the Indian School Certificate Examinations(CISCE)
- Website: sxs-bwn.org

St. Xavier's School, Burdwan, is a private Catholic primary and secondary and Higher Secondary school located in Bardhaman, West Bengal, India. The co-educational school was founded in 1964 and is managed by the Society of Jesus. It uses English as a medium for instruction and is unaided. This is the only co-educational Jesuit school under the St. Xavier's group of schools.

== Program ==
After much prodding by the District Magistrate of Burdwan, the Jesuits opened the school in 1964.

The school uses the Continuous and Comprehensive Evaluation assessment of student progress. Various co-curricular and extra-curricular activities are encouraged for the students' integral development. The school's motto is truth and justice, with emphasis on leadership in securing justice, especially for the most vulnerable. Team spirit and leadership qualities are fostered through the division of the school into four houses. Cultural programs and games are organized by the students. The school has a theatre hall for cultural offerings and for daily school assemblies.

In 2014 St. Xavier's School, Burdwan ranked 27th all over India for results on the internationally recognized Indian School Certificate (ISC) test. The school has added an ISC course in Biotechnology.

== See also ==
- List of Jesuit schools
- List of schools in West Bengal
