= St. Peter's High School, Jammu =

St. Peter's High School

Location
- NH 44, B.C. Road; Jammu, India, Jammu and Kashmir 180016; 32.727152°N 74.856377°E

Information
- Type: Missionary
- Religious affiliation: Roman Catholic
- Established: 1952; 74 years ago
- Founder: Fr. J. Boerkamp MHM
- Sister school: St. Peter’s Higher Secondary School, Karan Bagh
- Administrator: Diocese of Jammu - Srinagar Education Society
- Principal: Fr. S. Joseph
- Gender: Co-Education
- Classes offered: U.K.G to 10th
- Language: English
- Campus: Urban
- Colors: grey and white
- Affiliation: CBSE

St. Peter's High School, Jammu is an educational institution in Jammu started by Mill Hill Missionaries from London in 1952. The school belongs to the Roman Catholic Diocese of Jammu-Srinagar. The students of the school are referred to as Petrines, and the school's motto is "Ora et Labora" which means Prayer and Work. The school is currently affiliated to the Central Board of Secondary Education (CBSE).

== History ==
Father John Boerkamp MHM and Lt. Col. Dean requested the then Hon’ble Chief Minister, Sheikh Abdullah, for a piece of land in order to build a Convent School in Jammu. He rented a house near Kashmiri Mohalla, Baba Jivan Shah and stayed there for 2 years. It was from the same house that St. Peters' High School, B.C Road originated in 1952. Initially, it was an Urdu Medium School and only those Catholic Students were admitted who were denied admission elsewhere in Jammu City. In 1954, Father Boerkamp bought a bungalow at B. C. Road Jammu and began an English Medium School there with the help of the Presentation Sisters. In 1964, the Presentation Sisters moved to a new location establishing a new school now popularly known as Presentation Convent Senior Secondary School in Gandhi Nagar, while the B.C. Road School continued as St. Peters's. In 1999 St. Peter's Higher Secondary School, Karan Bagh was established as the Higher Secondary division of the school. The School changed its medium of instruction from Urdu to English in 1984 and in 1987 it was recognized as a High School by the State Government.

== See also ==
- List of Christian Schools in India
