= List of educational institutions in Secunderabad =

The list of educational institutions located in Secunderabad are:

- St. Ann's High School, Secunderabad, established in 1871
- St. Patrick's High School, Secunderabad, established in 1911
- Panchavati High School
- St. Andrew's High School
- Sherwood Public School (ICSE/ISC), established in 1984
- St John's Church High School
- St. Thomas (SPG) Boys' High School
- Veeramachaneni Padagaiah High School, Sithaphalmandi, Secunderabad, established in 1938
- Kasturba Gandhi College for Women
- Tapasya College of Commerce and Management
- Nizam College
- Mahbub College High School
- Seventh Day Adventist High School, Secunderabad
- Gandhi Medical College
- Mother Teresa High School, R.K.Puram, established in 1999.

== Engineering colleges in Secunderabad ==
- Swami Vivekananda Institute of Technology
