= Society for Welfare of the Handicapped =

- Formation: 1967
- Founder: S. Amar Singh Kamboj
- Type: Non-governmental
- Legal status: Active
- Headquarters: Amar Ashram
- Location: Village Saifdipur, Patiala, Panjab
- Region served: Patiala
- Services: Schools for the deaf, blind and deaf-blind
- Official language: Panjabi
- Key people: Col. Karaminder Singh, Retd. Balwinder Singh Brar
- Website: www.patialaschool.org

Society for Welfare of the Handicapped is a registered non-governmental organization of Patiala for the welfare of children with disabilities. It is a pioneer in the field of special education in North India. It is managing three schools Patiala School for the Deaf, Patiala School for the Blind and Patiala School for the Deaf-blind in a village near Patiala city of Panjab. The deaf and the blind school together have 200 children, of which 140 are deaf and 60 are blind. The third, Patiala School for the Deaf-blind, is 3rd of its kind in India.

It was founded by Sardar Amar Singh Kamboj in 1967 and got registered on 24 July 1967.

In 2017, the Patiala School for the Deaf sent two athletes to represent India in the World Deaf Olympics.
