= St. Mary's Higher Secondary School, Jharsuguda =

Secondary school in Odisha, India

Coordinates: 21.8736°N 84.0183°E

Information
- Established: 1959; 67 years ago
- Principal: Sr. Blessy
- Enrollment: c.2000 (2025)
- Houses: Red; Blue; Green; Pink
- Website: stmarysjharsuguda.com

St. Mary's Higher Secondary School is a Higher Secondary school at Cox Colony in the Jharsuguda district of Odisha, India. Established in 1959, this school provides higher level English medium education with sports and extra curricular activities facilitated. The school has a decent interior with surveillance cameras all around the campus. This school also provides Smart classes for deep understanding of different subjects. The school also encourages children to learn different activities that would prove to have an opportunity to make a career like Robotics and Music.

== History ==
It was founded in 1959 and, as of 2025, serves more than 2000 students. St Mary's Higher Secondary School is affiliated with the ICSE Board and ISC. Sr. Blessy is the present principal of the school.

== School structure ==
This school has a library, a physics lab, a chemistry lab, a biology lab and two computer labs. Each classroom has a Smartboard and a projector. Each year, the school has an investiture ceremony where leaders of the 4 houses (Red, Blue, Green, and Pink), Head Boy and the Head girl and the General Monitors are felicitated. The Vedanta Group of Jharsuguda are invited as the Chief Guest each time, who honour the ICSE School Topper and the ISC School Topper with Laptops. Every alternate year, the school hosts a School Function and the Sports Day.
