= St. Thomas (SPG) Cathedral, Secunderabad =

St. Thomas SPG Church
- 17.4349°N 78.4979°E
- Country: India
- Denomination: Secunderabad St. Thomas Mission (Anglican)

History
- Dedication: St Thomas

Administration
- Province: Secunderabad
- Diocese: Diocese of Secunderabad
- Archdeaconry: The Anglican Church of India

Clergy
- Bishop: Rt. Rev. Dr. Moses Asirvatham
- Priest(s): Rev. Johnson Malli: Rev. George Cornelius

St. Thomas (SPG) Church is one of the oldest churches in the city of Secunderabad, India. The church was built in the year 1852 by the British missionary society called the Society for the Propagation of the Gospel in Foreign Parts. The church is a prominent structure situated in close proximity to Secunderabad Railway Station.

== History ==
The church was built in 1852. The church possessed extensive lands much of which were bought by the British government of Secunderabad in order to build the existing Secunderabad Railway Station. The church now serves a Telugu and Tamil congregation.

The church runs high schools in Secunderabad and Ammuguda.

In 2023, the bishop was Rt. Rev. Dr. Moses Asirvatham; the cathedral has outreach work in Trimulgherry, Mettuguda, Moosrambagh, Kazipet, Moosapet and Tuni.

== Architecture ==
The church is built in the Gothic Revival style that was popular during the Victorian era. However the exterior of the church is simple with the bell tower abutting the Altar. The layout of the church is a cruciform with a nave and two transepts. The altarpiece of the church is a stained glass window depicting Christ the Good Shepherd.

== See also ==
- List of churches in Secunderabad and Hyderabad
- St. Mary's Church, Secunderabad
- St. Thomas (SPG) Boys' High School
- Secunderabad
