= Ingraham Institute =

School in Ghaziabad Uttar Pradesh, India

Location
- Raj Nagar & GB Road; Ghaziabad Uttar Pradesh; India

Information
- Motto: Be ye Light
- Principal: Mrs Arpana Ruth (ICSE Board); Mrs Mohini Sampson (CBSE Board)
- Gender: Co-Education
- Classes offered: Nursery – 12th
- Language: English
- Campus: Urban
- Affiliation: Council for the Indian School Certificate Examinations
- Website: http://www.ingrahaminstitute.com Official website

Ingraham Institute is an academic institute in Ghaziabad Uttar Pradesh, India. It was established in 1926.

It is one of the largest institutions of the Methodist Church in India. Ingraham has an Industrial Training Institute as well as a Polytechnic Institute and 12 schools that provide formal education up to the 12th-grade level standard. It offers lessons in both English and Hindi up to the 12th grade. The English medium is affiliated from Indian School Certificate (ISC). Hindi medium is affiliated from Uttar Pradesh State Board. The Ingraham Institute has a city branch which provides education up to the 10th standard, and it is affiliated with C.B.S.E. The school has a branch also for hearing-impaired students.

In 1919, F.M. North, an American missionary, conceived educational / vocational institutes in India to train the marginalized young people. The land for the school was purchased from Ghaziabad. A Teacher's Training School and a small dispensary was started on this land.
