= St. Xavier's Higher Secondary School, Bettiah =

St. Xavier's Higher Secondary School

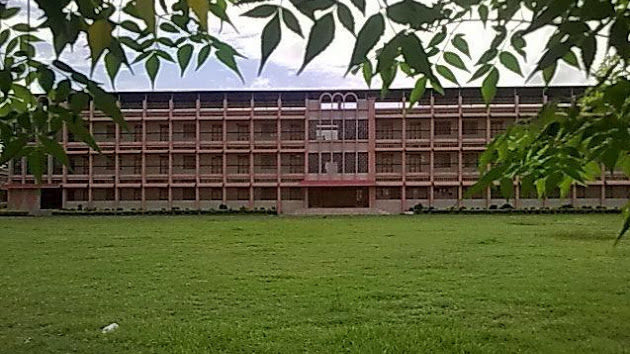

Location
- Bettiah, Bihar; India; 26°48′10″N 84°31′1.1″E

Information
- School type: Private primary and secondary school
- Motto: Service with Love
- Religious affiliation: Roman Catholic
- Denomination: Jesuits
- Patron saints: Francis Xavier, SJ
- Established: 1998; 28 years ago
- President: Fr.Joy Karayampuram, SJ
- Rector: Fr. Joy Marrypuram, SJ
- Principal: Fr. Richard D, SJ
- Faculty: 60+
- Grades: K-12
- Gender: Co-educational
- Average class size: 60/class
- Language: English
- Classrooms: 40
- Campus size: 5.44 hectares (13.4 acres)
- Affiliations: Central Board of Secondary Education, New Delhi
- Website: www.stxaviersbth.com

St. Xavier's Higher Secondary School is a private Catholic primary and secondary school located in Bettiah, Bihar, India. The school was founded in 1998 and is run by the Society of Jesus. The school offers kindergarten through higher secondary curriculum.

== History ==
The Society of Jesus (Latin: Societas Iesu, S.J., SJ, or SI) is a male religious order within the Catholic Church. Jesuits have been active in the field of education throughout the world from the start. The Jesuits number over 16,000 and comprise the largest single religious order in the Catholic Church. Jesuit priests and brothers are engaged in ministries in 112 nations on six continents. Their work is focused on education and intellectual pursuits, mainly at the secondary and tertiary levels, as well as missionary work and ministry in human rights and social justice. These educational institutions engage roughly 1 lakh collaborators and educate approximately 18 lakh students.

In India the Jesuits are responsible for 95 high schools. Jesuit education is inspired by the life and teachings of Jesus Christ and based on the principles of pedagogy elaborated by St. Ignatius of Loyola, with an emphasis on humanism and the service of others.

Founded by the Society of Jesus in 1998, the school offers the Central Board of Secondary Education Secondary School Examination (Class X) and Senior Certificate Examination (Class XII). In 2021, Vartika Jha, a student of Class 12th topped the district in CBSE Board examination with a score of 98.8%.

== Facilities and activities ==
The school has laboratories for physics, chemistry, biology, computers, English language, and a library with more than 20,000 books. It uses its website to inform parents of such matters as attendance, homework, syllabus, examination schedule, and diary, and to provide a platform for feedback from parents. The school and campus are covered by television surveillance (CCTV). Athletic facilities include a two hundred meter athletic track, music rooms and medical room. Sponsored sports include football, basketball, volleyball, throwball, badminton, table tennis, cricket, and karate.

The school has campus of 5.44 hectares (13.4 acres) and facilities for other sports activities and venues for cricket, badminton, tables tennis, basketball etc.

== See also ==
- List of Jesuit schools
- List of schools in Bihar
- List of Christian schools in India
- List of schools named after Francis Xavier
