= St. Joseph's Convent Girls' Senior Secondary School =

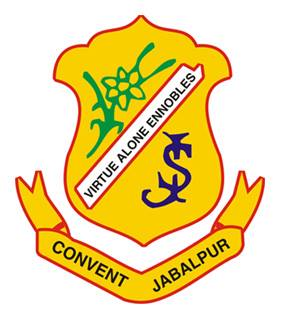

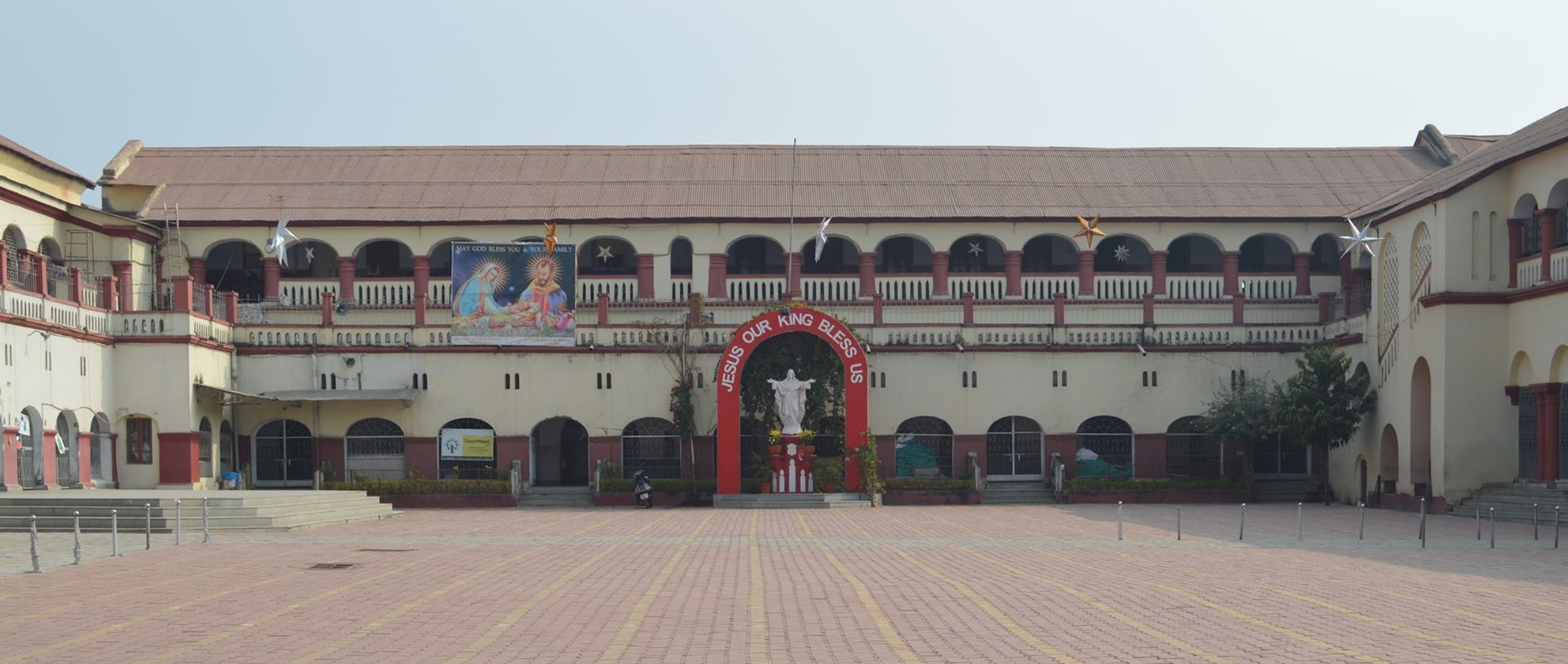

Location
- Ahilyabai Marg, Pentinaka; Cantonment; Jabalpur, Madhya Pradesh 482001; India

Information
- School type: Privately funded
- Motto: Virtue Alone Ennobles
- Religious affiliation: Roman Catholic
- Patron saint: Saint Joseph
- Established: 1873
- Locale: Sadar Cantonment
- School board: C.B.S.E., New Delhi
- Principal: Sr. Navya Mathew
- Gender: Female
- Average class size: 60
- Language: English
- Hours in school day: 6
- Colours: Blue, green, red and gold
- Yearbook: The Josephite
- Website: Official website

St. Joseph's Convent Girls' Senior Secondary School is a girls' convent school located in the city of Jabalpur, Madhya Pradesh, India. It is an English Medium Senior Secondary School for girls affiliated to the C.B.S.E, New Delhi. It conducts classes from kindergarten to the senior secondary level.

== History ==
The school was founded in 1873 by the Indian Province of the Sisters of St. Joseph of Chambéry. It is administered by the Sisters of St. Joseph's Convent, Jabalpur in accordance to the general rules governing the above congregation. Saint Joseph is the patron Saint of the school. Currently Sr. Navya is the Principal of the school.
