= Christ Jyoti Convent School, Sultanpur Lodhi =

Christ Jyoti Convent School
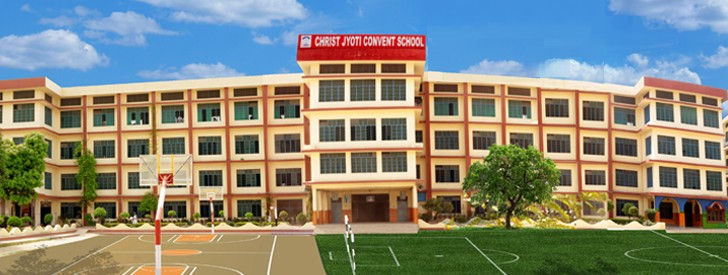
- Front View of Christ Jyoti Convent School

Location
- Sultanpur Lodhi; Punjab; 31°13′22″N 75°11′48″E

Information
- Established: 1998
- School board: ICSE
- Staff: 100+
- Enrollment: 2000+
- Management: Congregation of The Sisters of Nazareth

Christ Jyoti Convent School is a co-educational school located in Sultanpur Lodhi, Punjab, India. The school was established in 1998 and the students are eligible to take the Indian Certificate of Secondary Education exams. Christ Jyoti Convent School campus consists of 42 classrooms spread throughout the town.

== History ==
Christ Jyoti Convent School was founded in Sultanpur Lodhi, in the Kapurthala district of the Punjab, on 10 February 1998 by Rev. Sr. Terecine CSN, then Provincial Superior of Christ Jyothi Province, Allahabad.

The need to start an educational institution of Christ Jyothi in the Province of Punjab arose from discussions by the Provincial Team beginning in 1996. Sr. Maggie CSN, who was the principal of St. Mary's Convent School, Faridkot, and one of the Provincial Team members, approached Rt. Rev. Dr. Symphorian Keeparath, Bishop of Jalandhar, and outlined the need for the school. The Rev. Bishop agreed and entrusted Rev. Fr. Mathew Kokkandom to locate an appropriate piece of land for the CSN sisters to use for the school. The Rev. Father found a parcel of land in Sultanpur Lodhi. Rev. Mother Terecine CSN, Sr. Alacoque CSN and Sr. Maggie CSN went to Sultanpur Lodhi with Rev. Fr. Mathew Kokkandam to see the plot and arranged the purchase of the property on 26 March 1997. Harpreet Singh and his family was one of the benefactors who helped the sisters in the initial stages of the project.

The construction of the school building started on 28 January 1998, and was supervised by Rev. Srs. Majella and Sobita, who were staying in Kapurthala with the D.M Sisters. The Sisters moved to a rented house in Sultanpur Lodhi on 10 February 1998, to oversee the construction work, and were joined by Sr. Philomina CSN. The nursery and kindergarten classes started in the rented house on 3 March 1998, with seventy-five students and four teachers.

The foundation stone of the school building was laid by Rev.Fr.Mathew Nampudakam on 1 May 1998. Sr. Jasmine CSN joined this community as the principal of the school on 15 May 1998. Work on a few class rooms was completed first and they were blessed by Rev.Fr.Mathew Nampudakam on 17 September 1998. The blessing and inauguration of the school took place on 28 October 1998 by Rt. Rev. Dr. Symphorian Keeparath, then Bishop of Jalandhar. The school building was subsequently expanded with the addition of the 7th and 8th forms, and then the 9th and 10th forms, as well as the addition of lab facilities for physics, chemistry, biology, and computer sciences. The new block for the kindergarten section was blessed and opened on 8 November 2012 by Rt. Rev. Dr. Anil Joseph Thomas Cutto, then Bishop of Jalandhar. A proper functioning library was added as were an English language lab and an English Café in 2012. The ‘Smart Class’, electronic teaching system was installed in all class rooms in 2013. The school has Internet access in all rooms.

The school is affiliated with the Council for the Indian School Certificate Examination, New Delhi, and received its permanent affiliation on 13 May 2011. It received the Minority Status Certificate on 11 August 2011 from the National Commission for Minority Educational Institutions.

The current principal, Sr. Agnette CSN, took over the position on 6 June 2010.

== Board of Governors ==
Christ Jyoti Convent School is managed by the Christ Jyoti Province Society of the Congregation of Sisters of Nazareth (CSN). All the major issues effecting the school are made by Christ Jyoti Province Society. The society governs the School through meetings it holds once or twice a year at the Christ Jyoti Convent office that are attended by society members.

Current serving governing body members include: Sr. Saly Jose, President and Provincial Superior of Christ Jyoti Province, Allahabad, Sr. Avila CSN, vice president, and Sr. Sherly CSN, secretary.

Day-to-day matters are overseen by the school's Local Managing Committee, which includes: Sr. Agnette CSN, chairman, Sr. Saly Jose CSN, principal and secretary, Sr. Lavanya CSN, vice-principal and Treasurer, and a few other elected members.
