= Bishop Westcott Boys' School =

Building in India

- Other names: BWBS, Namkum
- Motto: Non Nascor Mihi Solum
- Motto in English: "Live Not For Self Alone"
- Type: Private school
- Established: 1927; 99 years ago
- Founder: Foss Westcott
- Affiliations: CISCE
- Principal: Mr J J Edwin
- Academic staff: 150+
- Students: 1800+
- Location: Ranchi, Jharkhand, India; 23°21′02″N 85°22′51″E
- Campus: 8.7 acres (3.5 ha); Boys School, Urban
- Colours: Navy Blue and Yellow
- Website: bishopwestcottboysschool.com

Bishop Westcott Boys' School (BWBS) is a boys' school in eastern India. It focuses on all-round development of students through various co-curricular activities. The school is located on the banks of the Subarnarekha River in Namkum block, 12 km (7.5 mi) from Ranchi, the capital of Jharkhand. The school is run by a managing committee, the Chotanagpur Diocese Society, formed by the governing body, which comprises educators and citizens. Mr. J J Edwin (Joel Jonathan Edwin) is the present principal of the institution, who was the former principal of the Bishop School, Pune. Mr. R. I. Thornton, the former principal, holds the distinction of being the school's longest-serving principal, having dedicated 49 years to the institution.

Founded on 24 February 1927 by Dr. Foss Westcott, the school building served as a makeshift hospital during World War II. It is one of the oldest schools in eastern India.

== Curriculum ==
The school is affiliated with the Council for the Indian School Certificate Examinations (CISCE). The students are a mix of boarders (hostellers) and day scholars.

The senior students are delegated responsibility by the school authority through their elevation as members of the Prefectorial Board, which is led by the school captain. Vice-captains on either wing assist the captain.

Participation in sporting events is encouraged through dedicated hours for boarding students. The school has facilities for soccer, volleyball, basketball, lawn tennis, table tennis and snooker .

The school has two canteens: The Bake Ville and The Witches Brew.

To cultivate a constructive competitive atmosphere, various activities are structured within an Inter-House framework, where students are assigned to one of four houses: ALLENBY, HASTINGS, NELSON, and WELLINGTON. These house names pay tribute to notable British Empire figures, with "Allenby" named after Edmund Allenby, "Hastings" honouring Warren Hastings, "Nelson" commemorating Horatio Nelson, and "Wellington" in recognition of Arthur Wellesley, 1st duke of Wellington.

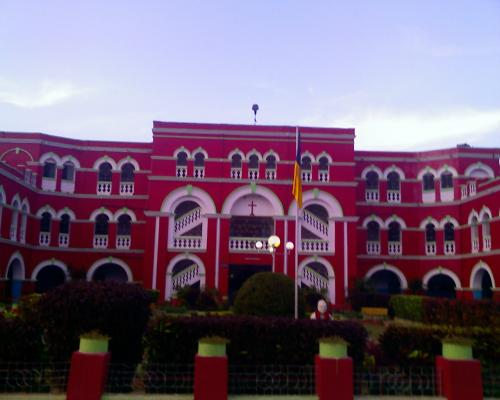
Main building

== History ==
The Bishop Westcott Boys' School was founded by Dr. Foss Westcott, Bishop of Chotanagpur, in 1927. The school originally consisted of a C-shaped "Main Building." A new hostel building was constructed, which houses an 800+ capacity dormitory.

== Campus ==
The school consists of an office building, another building for the library and laboratory, a junior hostel, a sick room, a servants' quarter, a staff residence, the principal's bungalow and playgrounds. A swimming pool is under construction. A 1,000+ capacity auditorium offers modern facilities for students' cultural activity.

== Principal Tenure ==
Name	Tenure
Rev. H. G. S. Kennedy	1927 - 1932
Rev. G. B. Hall	1933 - 1937
Rev. S. S. Horslen	1938
Rev. P. S. Mathews	1939 - 1942
Major L. S. Boot	1943
F. E. La Valette	1944 - 1973
Mr. S. Purty	1973 - 1974
Mr. A. E. Fitzerald	1975 -1981
Mr. R. I. Thornton	1982 - 2023
Mr. J. J. Edwin	2023 - Present
