= St. Thomas School, Ranchi =

St. Thomas School

Location
- Dhurwa, Ranchi, Jharkhand, 834004; India
- 23.3101692°N 85.2820358°E

Information
- Founded: 1967
- Principal: Rev. Thomas K. Thomas
- Campus: Urban
- Affiliation: ICSE
- Website: https://www.stthomasschoolranchi.com

St. Thomas School is a school in Dhurwa Ranchi. It is a private unaided school started in 1973. It has classes from 1 to 12 and is co-educational.

In December 2022, Heavy Engineering Corporation Limited, which leased the land to the school, has cancelled the lease agreement.

== See also ==
- Education in India
- Literacy in India
- List of schools in India
