= Sacred Hearts' School, Mangaluru =

Sacred Hearts' School

Location
- Mangaluru, Karnataka; India
- Coordinates: 12.853916°N 74.896424°E

Information
- Established: 1943

Sacred Hearts' School is a school situated at Kulshekar locality in Mangaluru city of Karnataka state in India. It was established on 31 May 1943. This school is run by the Bethany Educational Society.

== History ==
The school was started on 31 May 1943 by Msgr. R.F.C. Mascarenhas. The Sacred Hearts’ Secondary School (as it was then called) was inaugurated on 4 June 1943. The first batch from the school appeared for the SSLC Examination in 1947. The first 3 Headmistresses of this school were Smt. Laxmi Bai (1943–44), Sr. Bertha (1944–45) and Sr. Macrina (1945).
