= Panchavati Vatika =

Sacred trees groves in Indian subcontinent

- पंचवटी वाटिका
- Type: Groves of five types of sacred trees in Hinduism.
- Motto: Oxygen abundance
- Plants: Peepal, Banyan, Bēlapatra, Aamla and Ashok.

Panchavati Vatika (Sanskrit: पंचवटी वाटिका) in the Indian subcontinent refers to a sacred grove of five types of trees in Hinduism. The concept of the sacred Panchavati Vatika in Hinduism is mentioned the text Ramayana and Puranas, etc. The five types of trees in a panchavati vatika are Peepal, Banyan, Bēlapatra, Aamla and Ashoka. The Ramayana refers that in the Treta Yuga, Lord Rama along with his wife Goddess Sita and Lord Lakshmana lived at a panchavati vatika during their exile into forests.

== Description ==
In Hinduism, there are some guidelines for the formation of a panchvati vatika. All the five types of trees in a panchvati vatika are equally spaced. In the middle of the vatika, a pool also called as kund is formed. According to the guidelines, there are some specific directions for the plantation of the five types of trees. The peepal tree is planted in the East, whereas banyan in the West. Similarly, Bēlapatra, Amla and Ashok trees are planted in North, South, and South-East directions respectively.

The five types of trees of a panchavati are planted in the five directions at a distance of 10 meters from the center point of the kund formed in the middle of the sacred grove.

== Kund ==
The Kund at the centre of the panchavati vatika is formed according to the Vidhi Vidhan (rituals) in Hinduism. The panchavati vatika is established after performing Havan and Yajna, with Vedic Mantrochar (chanting) and Puja at the centre of the Kund.
