= St. Joseph's Technical Institute, Pune =

University in India

St. Joseph’s Technical Institute, Pune
- Established: 1959; 67 years ago
- Religious affiliation: Jesuit, Catholic
- Principal: Parag Khndagale
- Director: Vijay Chokhar
- Total staff: 15
- Students: 150
- Location: Shankarshet Road, Pune, Pune, Maharashtra, India; 18°30′1.82″N 73°52′2.46″E
- Campus: 7 acres (2.8 ha)
- Website: Official website

St. Joseph's Technical Institute (SJTI) is a higher educational institute located in Pune, India. It was opened in 1959 by the Jesuits of the Pune Province, India. It trains middle-level managers – technicians with a combination of practical expertise, theoretical knowledge, communication skills, and management perspectives.

Through work-study programs and assistance from abroad, SJTI assists the economically and socially backward classes to respond to a need in industry. SJTI has served as a model for other vocational education and training schools that are being promoted by the Indian government.

The institute is a member of Skills for Progress, an all-India association of private technical and vocational training institutes, and prepares students for the National Council on Vocational Training (NCVT) examination in the craftsmen training schemed courses of the Maharashtra State Board of Vocational Examinations.

== Courses ==
- ITI courses: Fitter, turner, mechanic (motor vehicle), welder
- Autonomous courses (full-time): Fitter, turner, mechanic (motor vehicle), machinist, welder,

== See also ==
- List of Jesuit educational institutions
