= St. Kevin's Anglo Indian Higher Secondary School =

Catholic Anglo-Indian girls' school in Chennai, India

St. Kevin's Anglo-Indian Higher Secondary School

Location
- Chennai, Tamil Nadu; India; 13°06′41″N 80°17′40″E

Information
- Type: Independent, girls' school, day
- Motto: For Faith and Morals
- Denomination: Roman Catholic, PBVM
- Established: 1905
- Headmistress: Sr. Famini
- Houses: St. Agnes (red); St. Cecilia (blue); St. Joseph (green); St. Paul (pink)
- Colours: Green and gold
- Former pupils: Kevinites
- Website: Official website

St. Kevin's Anglo-Indian Higher Secondary School is a Catholic girls' school in Royapuram, Chennai, Tamil Nadu, India. The school traces its history to St. Peter's School, which operated on the premises of Mater Dolorosa Church before being taken over by the Presentation Sisters. It was renamed Presentation Convent School in 1905 and subsequently underwent several name changes as it developed into a high school and later a higher secondary school.

== History ==
=== Early history ===
The school began as St. Peter's School on the premises of Mater Dolorosa Church in Royapuram, Madras (now Chennai), under the headmistress Mrs. Clement Nicholas. It initially had 55 Anglo-Indian boys and girls. The Presentation Sisters, who had been present in Madras since 1842, were asked by Archbishop Colgan in 1904 to establish a house in Royapuram and take over the running of the school. St. Peter's School was renamed Presentation Convent School in 1905.

The school's early leadership included Rev. Mother Catherine Murphy and Rev. Mother Xavier as superiors from 1905 to 1923, and Sr. M. D'Sales as headmistress from 1905 to 1923.

The school subsequently moved to a two-storey building on Arathoon Road. As enrolment increased, two adjoining properties, formerly the residences of the Reverend M. Markby and Feroze, were purchased to accommodate the growing school. The school eventually provided education up to Standard VII, and its pupils appeared for the Middle School Public Examination. An infant school was also established on the southern side of the campus.

=== Name changes and expansion ===
In 1930, the school's silver jubilee year, it was renamed St. Kevin European School, after the Irish saint Kevin of Glendalough. In 1933, it became St. Kevin's Girls School. The school was upgraded to high-school status in 1962 and became known as St. Kevin's Anglo-Indian High School.

In 1970, the school received the title "Best School in Royapuram" and a trophy. It later expanded its educational provision to the higher secondary level.

=== Campus development ===
The school campus underwent several construction and renovation projects during the twentieth century. A building was constructed along the western side of the campus in 1963. In 1986, the infant-school building was demolished and replaced with a structure containing classrooms and a laboratory. The original two-storey building on the northern side was demolished in 1987, when the school's stage was constructed. The building on the western side was extended in 1989.

The school's historical account records that the management, parents and teachers organised fundraising activities, including raffles, sponsored walks, fairs and cultural programmes, to help finance the construction work.

== Houses ==
The school is divided into four houses, each identified by a colour and a motto.

- St. Agnes House: Colour, red; motto, "Honour & Virtue".
- St. Cecilia's House: Colour, blue; motto, "Love & Harmony".
- St. Joseph's House: Colour, green; motto, "Honesty & Labour".
- St. Paul's House: Colour, pink; motto, "Sacrifice & Service".

== Activities ==
The school's Eco-club has organised environmental awareness activities, including Green Day celebrations held in connection with Earth Day. In August 2014, the school marked the occasion with activities promoting environmental protection and keeping the surroundings green and clean.

In the 15th and 16th All India Maths Science Talent Examinations, held in 2022–23 and 2023–24 respectively, students from the school received consolation awards.

The school's basketball team placed third in the girls' category at the Fittgen 3×3 Basketball Tournament in Chennai in November 2024. The team also finished as runner-up in the under-19 girls' category at an inter-school basketball tournament held at Jawaharlal Nehru Indoor Stadium in November 2024.

In September 2026, the school's team placed third in a basketball tournament hosted by Lady Sivaswami Ayyar Girls' School in Chennai.

== Community and heritage ==
St. Kevin's Anglo-Indian Higher Secondary School remains one of the institutions associated with Royapuram's Anglo-Indian heritage. The school's historical connections to the neighbourhood are part of the area's wider history of Anglo-Indian settlement and community life.

== Alumni ==
The school refers to its former students as "Kevinites".

=== Notable alumna ===
- Alisha Abdullah, Indian motorsport racer, attended St. Kevin's for her schooling before pursuing her higher secondary studies at Sacred Heart, Church Park, Chennai.

== See also ==
- Presentation Sisters
- Anglo-Indian people
