= Cathedral Vidya School (Lonavala) =

Coordinates: 18.760205°N 73.497893°E

Cathedral Vidya School, Lonavala
- Lonavala, Maharashtra; India

Information
- Type: Private School
- Motto: 'Clarum Efficiunt Studia' ('Studies Maketh Famous')
- Established: 2008; 18 years ago
- Principal: Mr. Pourushasp F Karkaria
- Houses: (In Order of Standings as of 2017); SAVAGE (1st Place); PALMER(2nd Place); WILSON (3rd Place); THOMAS(4th Place)
- Website: http://www.cathedral-lonavala.org

The Cathedral Vidya School, Lonavala was a co-educational English-medium international residential School. It was an affiliate of the 150-year-old Cathedral and John Connon School in Mumbai. The school was closed down in May 2022 due to lack of funds.

== The Academic Programme ==
The School offers :

1. . Classes 4 – 8 (English National Curriculum) - National Curriculum for England
2. . Classes 9 - 10 (IGCSE) - International General Certificate of Secondary Education
3. . Classes 11 – 12 (IBDP) - International Baccalaureate Diploma Programme
