= List of educational institutions in Mohali =

List of educational institutions in Ajitgarh, India

Mohali (officially Sahibzada Ajit Singh Nagar or Ajitgarh) is a district and town lying adjacent to the city of Chandigarh in Punjab, India.

== Universities ==
Universities of Chandigarh
University	Location	Type	Established	Specialisation	Sources
Chandigarh University	Mohali District	Private University	2012	Technology Placements	
Punjabi University Regional Centre for Information Technology and Management, Mohali	Mohali City	State University	2000	Computer Applications and Management	

== Business schools ==
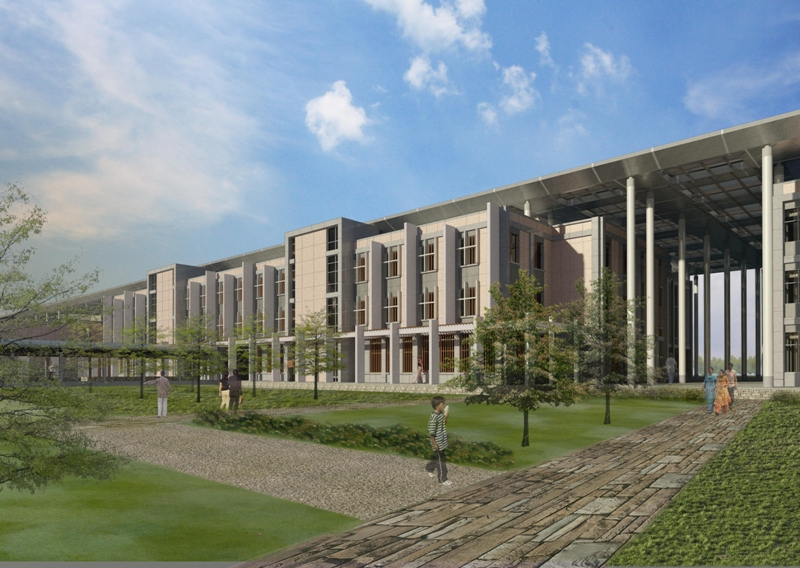
Indian School of Business, Ajitgarh

- Indian Institute of Science Education and Research, Mohali (IISER), Knowledge City
- Indian School of Business (ISB), Sector 81
- Chandigarh Business School (CBS), Landran

== Law schools ==
- Army Institute of Law

== Colleges ==
- Centre for Development of Advanced Computing (C-DAC), has a branch in Mohali.
- Chandigarh College of Education (CCE), Landran
- Chandigarh College of Hospitality (CCH), Landran
- Chandigarh College of Hotel Management and Catering Technology (CCHM), Landran
- Chandigarh College of Pharmacy (CCP), Landran
- Universal Group of Institution (UGI), Lalru
- Universal Institute of Management & Technology (UIMT), Lalru
- Mata Sahib Kaur College of Nursing, Chandigarh-Kharar Highway, Balongi, Ajitgarh (MSKCON)

== Pharmacy ==
- National Institute of Pharmaceutical Education and Research (NIPER)

== Schools ==
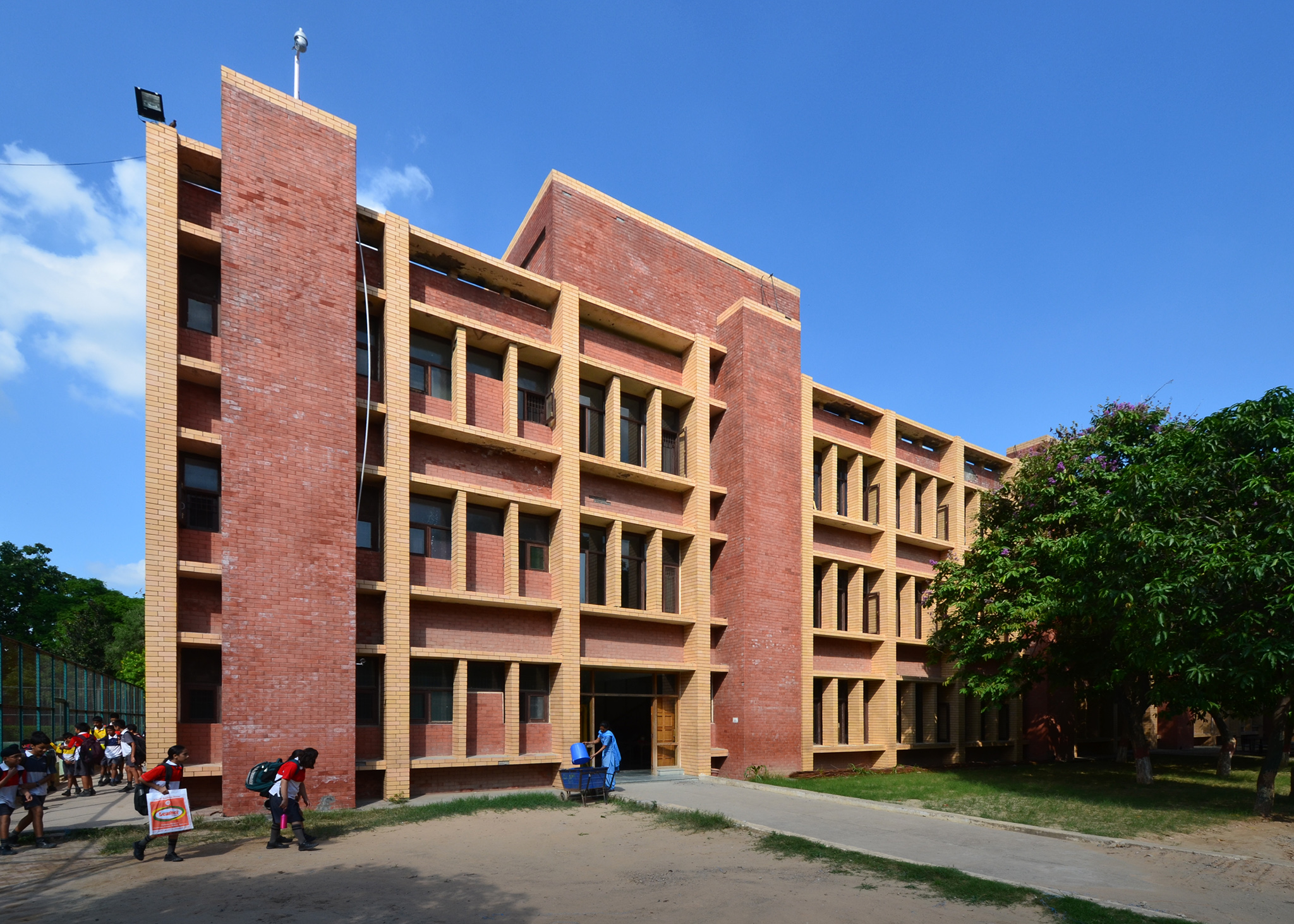
Yadavindra Public School

- Anee's School, Sector-69, Mohali
- Doon International School, Mohali, Sector-69, Mohali
- Gian Jyoti Public School, Phase 2, Mohali
- Gurukul World School, Sector-69, Mohali
- Shivalik Public School, Phase 6, Mohali (Established in Mohali during 1975 ).
- Small Wonders School Phase 7, Sector 61, Sahibzada Ajit Singh Nagar (Mohali).
- Yadavindra Public School, Sector 51, Mohali

== See also ==
- List of schools in India
