= St. Johns Vestry Anglo Indian Higher Secondary School =

St. John's Vestry Anglo-Indian Higher Secondary School

Location
- McDonalds Rd, Near Sangam Hotel, Cantonment, Tiruchirappalli, Tamil Nadu; India; 10.8032°N 78.6782°E

Information
- Established: 1763; 263 years ago

St. John's Vestry Anglo-Indian Higher Secondary School is a school located in Tiruchirappalli (also known as Trichy), Tamil Nadu, India.

It is one of the oldest school in Tamil Nadu and was established by the British around 1763. It first served as an orphanage for the children of British soldiers, but later established itself as a school and moved to its current location. It has a long history and is one of the oldest schools in Tamil Nadu with a rich Anglo-Indian tradition dating back to three centuries.
