= UDP-N-acetylglucosamine 4,6-dehydratase (configuration-inverting) =

Class of enzymes

Identifiers
- EC no.: 4.2.1.115

Databases
- IntEnz: IntEnz view
- BRENDA: BRENDA entry
- ExPASy: NiceZyme view
- KEGG: KEGG entry
- MetaCyc: metabolic pathway
- PRIAM: profile
- PDB structures: RCSB PDB PDBe PDBsum
Search
- PMC: articles
- PubMed: articles
- NCBI: proteins

UDP-N-acetylglucosamine 4,6-dehydratase (configuration-inverting) (EC 4.2.1.115, FlaA1, UDP-N-acetylglucosamine 5-inverting 4,6-dehydratase, PseB, UDP-N-acetylglucosamine hydro-lyase (inverting, UDP-2-acetamido-2,6-dideoxy-β-L)arabino-hex-4-ulose-forming)) is an enzyme with systematic name UDP-N-acetyl-α-D-glucosamine hydro-lyase (inverting; UDP-2-acetamido-2,6-dideoxy-β-L-arabino-hex-4-ulose-forming). This enzyme catalyses the following chemical reaction

UDP-N-acetyl-α-D-glucosamine $\rightleftharpoons$ UDP-2-acetamido-2,6-dideoxy-β-L-arabino-hex-4-ulose + H_{2}O

This enzyme contains NADP^{+} as a cofactor.
