= Strawberry Fields High School =

Location
- Sector 26, Chandigarh, Union Territory; India; 30.7287879°N 76.8123824°E

Information
- Type: Private school
- Established: 2004
- Principal: Nisha Kaul
- Campus: Urban
- Affiliations: ICSE, ISC, IB
- Website: strawberryfieldshighschool.com

Strawberry Fields High School is a private school in Chandigarh, India, affiliated to the Indian Certificate of Secondary Education and Indian School Certificate (ISC). It is also affiliated by the International Baccalaureate (IB) for the Primary Years Programme and to award IB Diplomas. The School also offers the Cambridge Lower Secondary programme for Grades 6–8.

The Durga Das Foundation, which governs the school, also inaugurated its third branch, Strawberry Fields High School, New Chandigarh, on 7 April 2025.

.

== See also ==
- Education in India
- Literacy in India
- List of institutions of higher education in Punjab, India
