= Government model high school sector 25 Chandigarh =

Government Model High School, Sector-25, Chandigarh
- Sector 25 Chandigarh UT; Punjab, Chandigarh; India

Information
- Other names: GMHS25, 25Model
- Former name: Government Model girls school
- School type: State-funded Government school for public
- Motto: Satyamev Jayate
- Established: 1978
- Founder: Government of Chandigarh
- School board: Central Board of Secondary Education, CBSE
- Local authority: Chandigarh education administration
- Educational authority: CBSE, S.C.O 34 to 37 Jublie square, Block E aerocity, Sector 82, SAS Nagar, Mohali, (PB)
- Category: Government school
- School number: 01722700139
- Principal: Rajinder Singh
- Staff: 250+
- Teaching staff: 100+
- Enrollment: +800 (2021)
- Classes: Nursery to 10th
- Language: English, Hindi, Punjabi
- Schedule: 7:30 AM 2:30 PM
- Hours in school day: 6 hours
- Classrooms: 75+
- Campus size: (minimum) 0.5 kg
- Houses: Laghpat house, Shubhasph house, Patel house, Shrabha house
- Song: Jana Gana Mana
- Sports: Hockey, basketball, football
- Teams: Hockey
- Team name: GMHS Sec 25 hockey team
- School fees: 150 $ for General
- Website: www.gmhs25.com
- Last updated: "1 June August 2025" (Shivam)

Government Model high School, Sector-25 (often called GMHS-25 or simply 25model) is a State-funded co-educational secondary school located in Chandigarh, India, educating students in grades K–12. Founded in 1954 it is the oldest school in Chandigarh and among the most selective. The school is affiliated to the Central Board of Secondary Education and offers twenty-three subjects at the AISSCE level, among the highest for any school in the region. It also claims a 100% pass percentage at the All India School Certificate Examination level.

The school's main building was designed by Swiss architect Pierre Jeanneret in line with the former's modernist ideals and was inaugurated by the then Commissioner of the Union Territory of Chandigarh.
