= St. Patrick's Anglo Indian Higher Secondary School =

- Adyar, Chennai, Tamil Nadu; India

Information
- Type: Co-educational
- Motto: Ora Et Labora (Prayer and Work)
- Established: 1875
- Principal: Bro.John Kennedy.Y
- Mascot: 3 Leaf Shamrock
- Website: ]

In 1875 St. Patrick's Anglo Indian Higher Secondary School was established in Chennai to provide education to the sons of British settlers in Madras (now referred to as Chennai).

In 1875 Dr. Fennelly, Archbishop of Madras, invited the Brothers of St. Patrick's to his diocese for taking over control and management of a home for the poor boys which had been founded by Archbishop Carew in 1850. Responding to this invitation, Bro. Ignatius Price, Bro. Paul Hughes and Bro. Fintan Parkinson set out from Mountrath (Ireland). They were the pioneers of the "Patrician Brothers" mission in India. The school and home were in the heart of the city at that time, Armenian Street. In fact, the Brothers also taught and managed the present St. Mary's School for 10 years.

Elphinstone Park, Adyar, a property of about 158 acres with a large building was bought on 1 July 1885 and the home for the boys was transferred there the same day. It was during the incumbency of Bro. Aloysius Hogan in 1889, that the school made much progress. The School Band was started which greatly helped the inmates in getting into the Military Bands of regiments scattered all over India and Burma. For example, the famous Governor's Band consisted mainly of St. Patrick's students. During World War II, the Institution was shifted to the Coimbatore Government Arts College till June 1946.

July 1, 1910 was the 25th anniversary of the institution after moving from Armenian Street to Elphinstone Park, Adyar. At this juncture, an appeal for funds to build dormitories and more classroom accommodation was made. The construction was started on 17 March 1913, St Patrick's Feast Day and was completed in 1915 at a total cost of Rs. 73,700.00. In due course, more and more boys were admitted to St. Patrick's. Many past pupils of the school held positions of responsibility and trust in government offices and in private business firms. Many brought credit to their school by deeds of bravery in both World Wars, and some entered Seminaries and Novitiates of Religious Orders. The physical training given bore fruit when two past pupils were in the Team that represented India in the Olympic Games in Amsterdam in 1928.

Most distinguished of all the old boys was Cyril Francis Martin who lost his life on 11 August 1930 in attempting to save the life of a child who had fallen overboard from the ship 'S.S. Vita' between Bombay and Basra. Martin was the purser of the ship. In January 1931, Mr. Bambridge, Director, M/s Binny & Company, Madras, presented to the school the "ROYAL HUMANE SOCIETY'S MEDAL" and certificate which had been awarded posthumously to Mr. Martin. His photograph still stands proud on the wall of St. Patrick's. Rev. Bro. Alphonsus Carr was the first past pupil to join the "Brothers of St. Patrick".

In the early 50s the vast school land was sold to Gandhinagar Housing Society and the present Gandhi Nagar Colony came up. The number of boarders also reduced after India gained independence due to emigration to Australia and Great Britain. In 1959 a Chapel was built and dedicated to St. Patrick. Day Scholars began to join the school.

The last Irish Principal of St. Patrick's was Rev. Bro. O'Brien and the first Indian Brother to succeed him was Rev. Bro. Bernard in 1970.

In 1975 the School celebrated its centenary. The celebration was a tribute to 100 years of Patrician Brothers Service in Chennai. To commemorate the centenary a Plus Two Block was built and it was opened by the then Chief Minister, Dr. M. Karunanidhi. In 1978, the school was upgraded to the Higher Secondary Level.

In the early 80's a new dining room and a kitchen was built for the boarders with contribution from the Australian Province. In 1987 another story was added for the boarder dormitory. The year 1991 saw the completion of a three-year massive renovation of the oldest building and it was dedicated to all the old students of St. Patrick's on 17 March 1991. Co-education was introduced up to Std. XII in 1993. In the same year a multipurpose building was constructed consisting of a hospital, Box room, audio visual room, and Table Tennis room. In March 1999 a new school building exclusively for Primary Classes from LKG to Std. V was built facing Kottur.

In the year 2000, the first batch of female students graduated in flying colours. Both boys and girls have reached the State level in Athletics and Games. The school surrounding was improved by tarring the roads in the campus and a new bus was purchased for the student's use. As part of the 125th Jubilee year celebration 32 students received their First Holy Communion during the high Mass, celebrated by Arul Das James, Archbishop of Madras-Mylapore. This was followed by a cultural programme and dinner for special invitees which included the staff of St. Patrick's and St. Michael's, priests and religious members of nearby parishes and communities.
