= St. Theresa's Girls' Higher Secondary School =

Location
- 1, Rajendra Prasad Road; Pallavaram; Chennai, Tamil Nadu, 600043; India

Information
- Religious affiliation: Roman Catholic
- Denomination: Non-denominational
- Patron saint: Thérèse of Lisieux
- Established: 1945
- Founder: Bon Secours Sisters
- Principal: Sr. Maria Philomi A.
- Grades: 12
- Enrollment: 4800 (approx.)
- Language: English
- Colours: Copper Sulfate Blue and White
- Affiliations: Bon Secours Sisters
- Former pupils: Theresians
- Website: sttheresaghss.com

St. Theresa's Girls' Higher Secondary School is a day school at Pallavaram in Chennai that was founded in 1945 by the Bon Secours Sisters of Mylapore.

== History ==
In the year 1945, the Bon Secours Sisters instituted a primary school with five grades which was followed by its upgradement into a higher elementary school in 1960. In 1963, the school was established as a high school, courtesy of the endeavours of Fr. Mathew Vetrical and Mother Mary Christie. The year 1978 saw the school become a higher secondary school.

== Academics ==
The school educates girls up to Class XII. The medium of instruction is English. Tamil is incorporated into the syllabus as the second language. General subjects such as Mathematics, Science and Social Science (which comprises History, Geography, Civics and Economics) along with English and Tamil are taught up to the High School level.

The Higher Secondary curriculum consists of discipline-oriented streams pertaining to Computer Science, Natural Sciences and Commerce.

Board examinations are conducted annually for Classes X and XII and the answer scripts are assessed by select staff assigned by the Government of Tamil Nadu.

== Infrastructure and facilities ==
The school has a library that can be accessed between 9 AM to 5 PM.

There are laboratories for Physics, Chemistry, Biology and Computer Science.

There is the Adaikala Annai Women's Community College onsite along with St. Francis Xavier's Nursery and Primary School.

== Rape and murder hoax ==
In August 2014, the institution was under scrutiny owing to a spurious rumor about the rape and murder of a girl in the school bathroom by migrant workers. The message was circulated via WhatsApp and Facebook. Sarguna, a district social welfare officer from Kanchipuram, along with Shanthi, the chief educational officer, the Alandur Tashildar and the Chromepet police descended upon the school for the purpose of verification of the rumor that they had received via SMS.

Overwrought parents resisted security's attempts to keep them from entering the campus and they demanded to know the truth behind the matter from the school office. Seeing a number of coolies on campus, the agitated parents asked for them to be dismissed.

The perpetrator was found to be 28-year old Sampath, who laid the cornerstone of the hoax when he failed to secure admission in the institution for a friend's daughter. It was inferred that the accused had used a graphically altered photograph of a bleeding girl in the viral message. He was booked under IPC Section 505 (1)(b).

The investigating authorities checked on the orphan students in the hostel as well as those pupils who were on leave.

In light of the same, the Headmistress, Sr. Maria Philomi said, "It's fake. We have been running the educational institution for the past 50 years and we treat all children as our daughters. I request the parents not to believe such rumours. Every girl student here is safe. We hope the police will nab those who spread the rumours."

As a precautionary measure, police were posted outside the premises and CCTV cameras were installed at the entrance.

== Events ==
- Feast of St. Thérèse (30 September)
- Bon Secours Feast Day (24 May)
- Sports Day
- Teachers' Day (5 September)
- Children's Day (14 November)

The school celebrated its Ruby Jubilee in 2003 and its Golden Jubilee in 2013.
