= St. Raphael's Girls' Higher Secondary School =

Secondary school in Madhya Pradesh, India

Coordinates: 22.710°N 75.888°E

Information
- Religious affiliation: Catholicism
- Established: 1928; 98 years ago
- Grades: Pre-Nursery - Grade 12
- Gender: Girls
- Website: straphaelsindore.in

St. Raphael's Higher Secondary School is a Catholic all-girls' convent school founded by Fr. Raphael, OFM Cap in 1928 in Indore, Madhya Pradesh, India.

Located at 15 Old Sehore Road, the school is administered by the Sisters of the Holy Spirit (SSpS). It received affiliation from the Central Board of Secondary Education (CBSE) in the 1996–1997 academic year. The school offers classes from pre-nursery through Class 12 under the CBSE curriculum.
