= St. Anthony's Higher Secondary School, Shillong =

Coordinates: 25.5691°N 91.8939°E

St. Anthony's Higher Secondary School
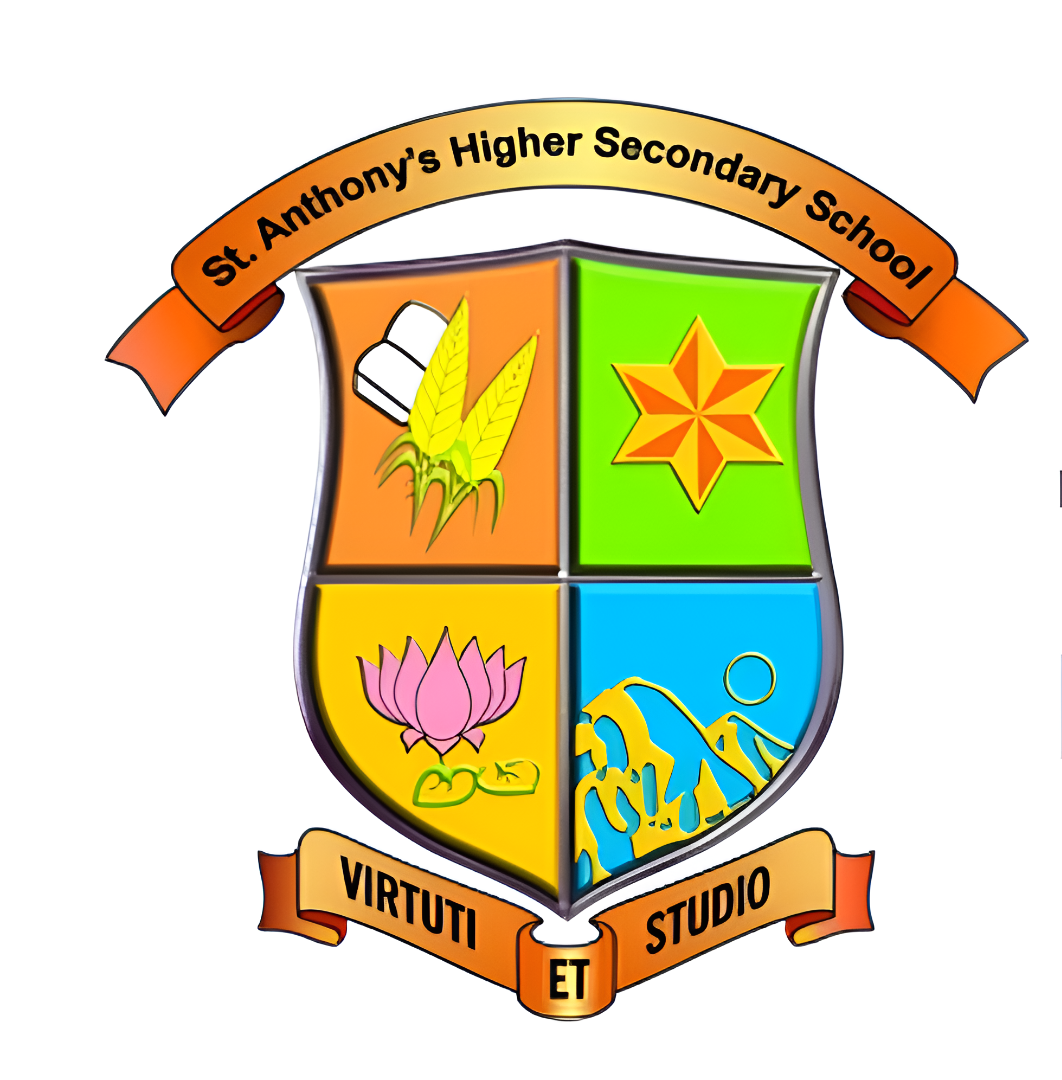

Location
- Laitumkhrah Don Bosco Square; Shillong, Meghalaya, 793003; India

Information
- School type: Minority
- Motto: Virtuti et Studio ("Work and Study")
- Religious affiliation: Catholic Church
- Patron saint: St. Anthony of Padua
- Established: 1901; 125 years ago
- Founder: Salvatorian
- Status: Active
- Administrator: Principal
- Principal: Rev. Dr. Fr. Anthony Kharkongor
- Secondary years taught: 6th through 12th
- Gender: 6th to 10th Class - Boys 11th to 12th - Coed
- Classes: 6TH – 12TH
- Language: English
- Hours in school day: 6 hours
- Campus: Urban
- Houses: Netaji, Ambedkar, Shastri and Patel
- Colours: Red, Green, Yellow and Blue
- Rival: St. Edmund's School
- Affiliation: Meghalaya Board of School Education
- Website: https://www.shillonganthonian.org/

St. Anthony's Higher Secondary School is an educational institution of the Catholic Church in Shillong, India. It is managed by the Salesians of Don Bosco Educational Society (registered as 'St. Anthony's Educational and Charitable Society' under the Meghalaya Societies Registration Act 12 of 1983. no e. 16 (RS) 30/2001/374).Guided by the religious and educational philosophy of St. John Bosco, the school was founded to bring school education within the reach of the common man.

== History ==
The Salvatorian missionaries who brought the Catholic faith amongst the Khasi reached Shillong in 1890. They opened the first catholic school in 1901, i.e., St. Anthony's School . On 1st May 1908 , St. Anthony's has attained the rank of Middle English School . On 15th August 1911 , the new building of the school is opened under the name "St. Anthony's School and Orphanage" . Fr. Winkler SDS was the first director of the orphanage. It was later handed to the Jesuits in 1915 when the Salvatorian has to leave Assam . Fr. JU Lambergh SJ was the first Jesuit director of the orphanage and school. In the same year Bro Leo Brisson CSC became the director.

The administration of the existing school and orphanage was handed over to the Salesians of Don Bosco when they arrived in North East India in 1922. Rev. Fr. Bonardi, SDB, served as the first Salesian headmaster. In 1928, under the leadership of newly appointed headmaster Fr. Joseph Bacchiarello, the orphanage was formally separated from the academic school. A vocational institution, the Don Bosco Industrial School (now Don Bosco Technical School), was established on an adjacent site and placed under the supervision of parish priest Fr. Vendrame, SDB.

The school received official government recognition on August 19, 1932. During its formative years, Salesian theology students served as the teaching staff until they were exempted from the responsibility in 1933.

== World War II and the College Expansion (1934–1945) ==
In 1934, Fr. Bacchiarello founded St. Anthony's College, initially offering an Arts section and a teacher's training program. He was succeeded in 1935 by Fr. Igino Ricaldone, who commissioned the construction of a large new building to accommodate the growing student body. For a time, both the school and the college shared this main building which is opposite to Don Bosco Technical School .

The outbreak of the Second World War severely impacted the campus, as the military requisitioned the main building. Throughout the war years, the school and college were forced to operate on a shift system in the remaining available spaces. During this period, Fr. Noel Joseph Kenny joined the college faculty in 1940 and was given additional administrative responsibilities over the school in 1943.

== Post-War Relocation and Independence (1946–1991) ==
Following the war, the college and the high school physically separated. St. Anthony's College took full occupation of the main building, prompting the High School to relocate to the Don Bosco complex. This move marked the school's transition into a fully independent administrative entity in 1946, with Fr. Kenny serving as headmaster.

The subsequent decades saw steady growth under successive headmasters, including Fr. John Odey, Fr. Tarcisius Resto Phanrang, Fr. Abraham Alangimattathil, and Fr. Henry Lionel. During Fr. K.V. George’s tenure (beginning in 1971), the school gained prominence in regional sports, notably winning the Subroto Cup. Fr. Stephen Mavely assumed leadership in 1981 and initiated the construction of the Don Bosco Mini Stadium. He was succeeded in 1986 by Rev. Fr. Louis Arimpoor, and later by Fr. Sebastian Palatty in 1990.

== The New Campus and Academic Restructuring (1992–Present) ==
In 1992, the junior school was temporarily given a separate identity at Anton Hall. Simultaneously, the Salesian Province initiated the construction of a permanent, dedicated campus for the high school at the "Old College site."

The junior school was re-amalgamated into the high school in 1995, and in 1996, the institution introduced the Higher Secondary (+2) Science stream under the Meghalaya Board of School Education. On March 17, 1997, the entire school shifted to the newly completed building. It was blessed by former headmasters Archbishop Tarcisius Resto Phanrang and Bishop Abraham Alangimattathil, and formally inaugurated on March 20, 1997, by Meghalaya Governor M.M. Jacob. St. Anthony's Higher Secondary School subsequently became a constituent of the Salesian Training Centre (STC). Fr. Joseph Anikuzhikattil assumed the roles of principal, secretary, and vice-rector on April 7, 1997.

A major structural reorganization occurred on March 1, 2000. The Higher Secondary section introduced a Commerce stream and transitioned to a co-educational model. Concurrently, the primary section (Nursery to Class 5) was separated to form St. Anthony's Lower Primary School and relocated back to the school's historical site adjacent to the Don Bosco Technical School, under the administration of Headmaster Fr. Marius Thongnibah.

The school has continued to modernize its academics and administration in the 21st century. In December 2006, Bro. Albert Longley Dkhar became the first Salesian Brother to serve as principal. An Arts stream was introduced at the Higher Secondary level in May 2010. Under the leadership of subsequent principals, including Fr. Rajendran K. George, Fr. Bernard Grace Pala, Fr. Surjit Tigga, and Fr. Anthony Kharkongor, the school modernized its infrastructure, introducing Smart Classes in 2011 alongside dedicated Sports and Computer Academies.

== Headmaster and principal ==
- 1911 : Rev. Fr. Heribert Winkler SDS
- 1915 : Rev. Fr. J.U. Lambergh SJ
- 1915 : Rev. Br. Leo Brisson CSC
- 1922 : Rev. Fr. Joseph Bonardi SDB
- 1928 : Rev. Fr. Joseph Bacchiarello SDB
- 1934 : Rev. Fr. IginoRicaldone SDB
- 1941 : Rev. Fr. Remo Silva SDB
- 1942 : Rev. Fr. Cremin SDB
- 1943 : Rev. Fr. Noel Joseph Kenny SDB
- 1949 : Rev. Fr. Albert Negri SDB
- 1951 : Rev. Fr. Orestes Pavioti SDB
- 1952 : Rev. Fr. Joseph ArokiaSwamy SDB
- 1959 : Rev. Fr. Noel Joseph Kenny SDB
- 1961 : Rev. Fr. TarcisiusRestoPhanrang SDB
- 1966 : Rev. Fr. John O’Day SDB
- 1966 : Rev. Fr. Abraham Alangimattathil SDB
- 1967 : Rev. Fr. Henry Lionel SDB
- 1971 : Rev. Fr. George Karippaparampil SDB
- 1981 : Rev. Fr. Stephen Mavely SDB
- 1986 : Rev. Fr. Louis Arimboor SDB
- 1990 : Rev. Fr. Sebastian Palatty SDB
- 1997 : Rev. Fr. Jose Anikuzhikattil SDB
- 1998 : Rev. Fr. John Parankimalil SDB
- 2007 : Rev. Br. Albert Longley Dkhar SDB
- 2010 : Rev. Fr. RajendranKuttinadar SDB
- 2012 : Rev. Fr. Bernard Grace Pala SDB
- 2016 : Rev.Fr.Surgit Tigga SDB
- 2019: Rev.Fr. Anthony Kharkongor
