= Karnataka Secondary Education Examination Board =

Indian state government agency

Karnataka School Examination and Assessment Board
- ಕರ್ನಾಟಕ ಶಾಲಾ ಪರೀಕ್ಷೆ ಹಾಗೂ ಮೌಲ್ಯ ನಿರ್ಣಯ ಮಂಡಳಿ
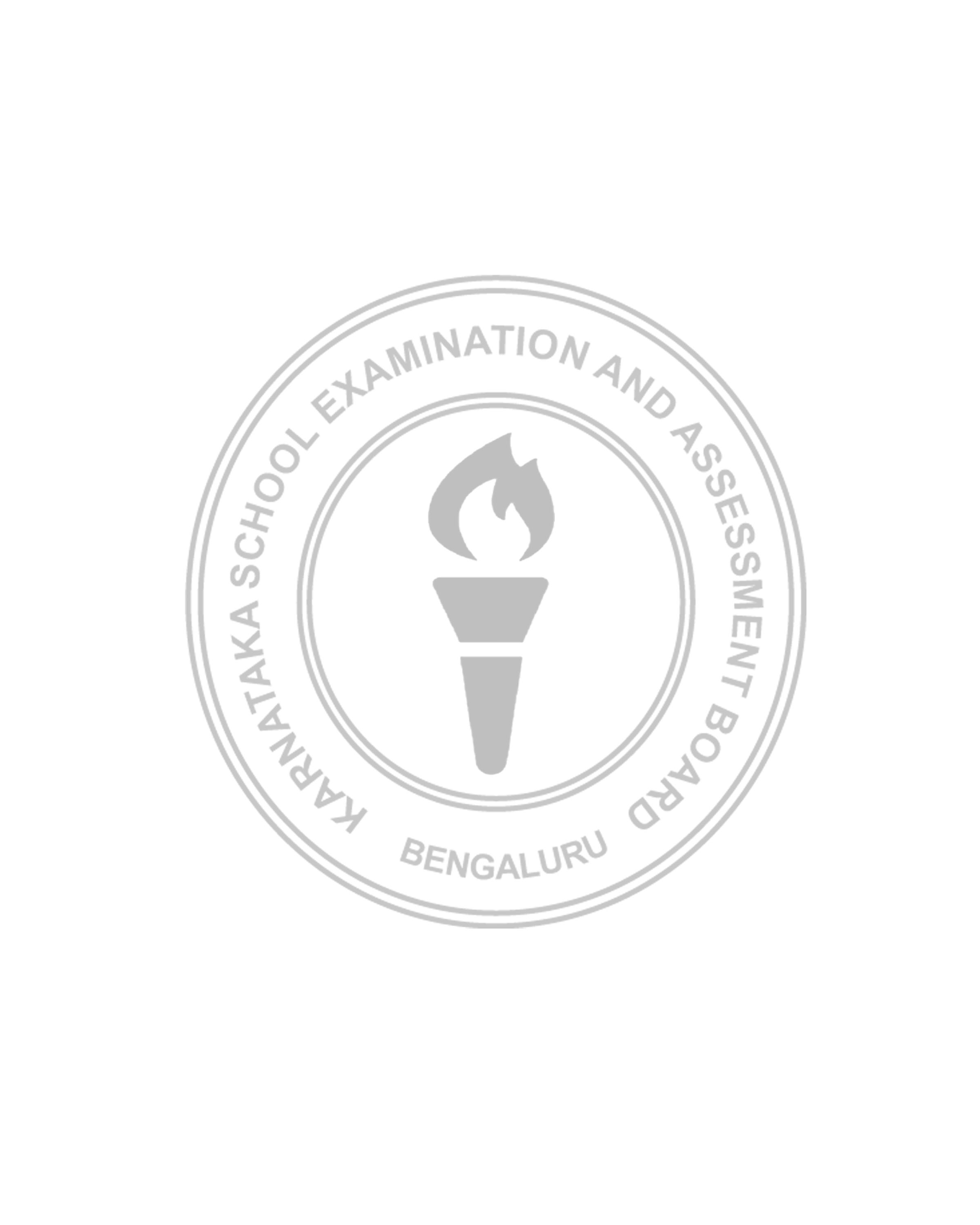
- official logo of KSEAB

- official Emblem of Karnataka

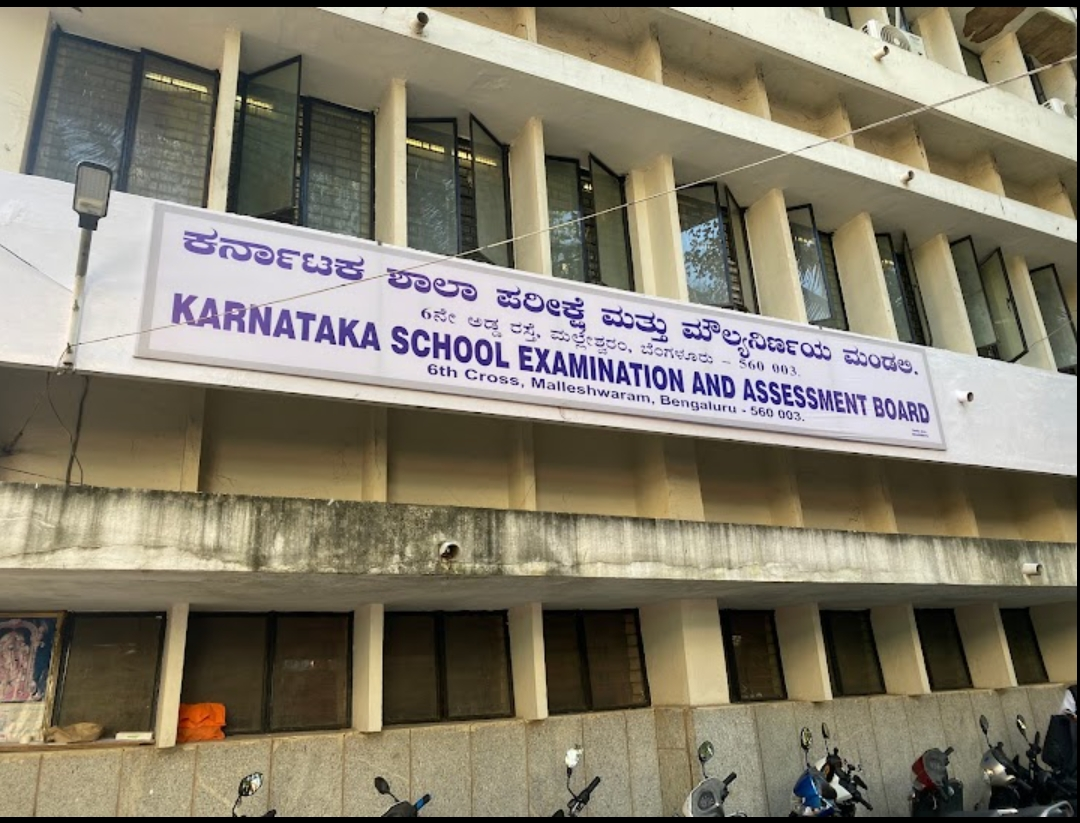
- Karnataka School Examination and Assessment Board office, Bengaluru

State Education Board overview
- Formed: 1966 (60 years ago); as Mysuru Secondary Education Examination Board; 1 November 1974 (51 years ago); renamed as Karnataka Secondary Education Examination Board; 2022 (4 years ago); Department of Pre-University Education, Karnataka (DPUE) and Karnataka Secondary Education Examination Board (KSEEB) merged into Karnataka School Examination and Assessment Board(KSEAB)
- Type: State Examination Board
- Jurisdiction: Karnataka
- Status: Active
- Headquarters: 6th cross, Malleswaram, Karnataka.
- Employees: Approximately 260
- State Minister responsible: Madhu Bangarappa, Minister of Primary and Secondary Education (Karnataka)
- State Education Board executives: H BASAVARAJENDRA, I.A.S, Chairman; GOPALAKRISHNA H N, Director of SSLC Exams; SOUJANYA BHARANI, KAS, Director of PUC Exams
- Parent State Education Board: Ministry of Primary and Secondary Education of Karnataka
- Website: kseab.karnataka.gov.in

The Karnataka Secondary Education Examination Board (KSEEB) which is also known as Karnataka SSLC Board, came into existence in the year 1966 and got merged with Department of Pre-University Education, Karnataka (DPUE) which is also known as Karnataka PU Board and got officially renamed as Karnataka School Examination and Assessment Board, abbreviation as KSEAB in 2022, is a State School Education Board of Karnataka. KSEAB came into existence in the year 1966. The Board conducts the SSLC (Class 10th) Examination in March / April each year, 2nd PUC (Class 12th) Examination and other examinations are also conducted by this board. KSEAB conducts examinations for Classes 10th and 12th of affiliated Schools and Junior Colleges.

The board regulates and supervises the system of Secondary education in Karnataka State. It executes and governs various activities that include devising of courses of study, prescribing syllabus, conducting examinations, granting recognitions to schools and, providing direction, support and leadership for all secondary educational institutions under its jurisdiction. There are further few open and private boards like Karnataka State Open Education Examination Board too running in the state, which are independent from KSEAB.

Formerly Department Of Pre- University Education, Karnataka used to deal with Senior Secondary Education (Classes 11th and 12th) also known as PUC in state of Karnataka and now that is part of KSEAB in State Of Karnataka.
