= Chandigarh Baptist School =

Coordinates: 30.7071353°N 76.7518805°E

Location
- Sector 45 D Chandigarh, India; Chandigarh, India, 160047

Information
- School type: Private School
- Motto: Walk As Children of Light
- Denomination: North West India Baptist Association
- Established: 1986; 40 years ago
- Founder: Rev. Nazir Masih
- Status: Operational
- School board: Central Board of Secondary Education, New Delhi, India
- Director: Rev. Tanuj Paul Masih
- Principal: Mrs. Sarojini Masih
- Staff: 120
- Teaching staff: 80
- Grades: Pre-Nursery to 12th
- Years offered: 1986 to Present
- Gender: Co-educational
- Age: 3 to 18
- Enrolment: 1150
- Average class size: 30
- Student to teacher ratio: 17:1
- Classes offered: Pre-nursery to Senior Secondary level
- Language: English
- Schedule: 8 AM - 2 PM
- Hours in school day: 07
- Houses: Jupiter, Uranus, Venus, Mars, Saturn
- Athletics: Yes
- Sports: Yes
- Website: http://chdbaptist.com/

Chandigarh Baptist School is a Baptist co-educational senior secondary private school in Chandigarh, India

== History ==
Founded in 1986 by a non-governmental organisation, North West India Baptist Association, as a pre-school, it was elevated to the upper-primary school in 1993, and in 2001 to the secondary school. In 2007, it was further upgraded to the senior secondary level educational institution.

The school is administered by North West India Baptist Association and is affiliated to Central Board of Secondary Education, New Delhi, India. The school has close to 1,200 in attendance.

== See also ==
- Education in India
- Chandigarh
