= St. Thomas (SPG) Boys' High School =

Location
- 9464, Opp. Railway Station, East Marredpally, Secunderabad; Hyderabad, Telangana, 500026; India; 17.4514041°N 78.5051137°E

Information
- Type: Private school
- Established: 1850

St. Thomas (SPG) Boys' High School was one of many old schools in the city of Secunderabad in Telangana, India, a few minutes' walk from the Secunderabad railway station.

SPG stands for "Society for the Propagation of Gospel" which was renamed "Church of South India" in the 1960s.

== History ==
The school was established in the 1850s as an adjunct to St Thomas' church which is located a few hundred yards from the school. In the 1950s the Principal of the school also functioned as correspondent (manager) of the church and was provided accommodation on church premises. The church grounds had a small dormitory for boys and living quarters for the warden. The grounds were available as playground for the school's students. In later years the association between the church and the school appears to have become weaker and the Principal lived elsewhere in the city.

A girls school by the same name offering instruction from class 1 to 8 was located near Manohar cinema a few hundred meters from the boys School. The girls school admitted boys also up to class 4. Boys could transfer for class 5 to the boys school.

The medium of instruction was English (but in the 1950s and 1960s the medium of instruction was both Telugu and English).

It was one of the few schools in Telangana that provided an option to register Tamil as the first language. This option was available to students in the English medium classes and for Tamil language classes the students would move to a different room. Due to the preponderance of Defence and Railway installations in Secunderabad, there was a large Tamil speaking population and this school catered to its needs.

The school had one of the best football teams in the twin city. The NCC in the school was also one of the best in the twin cities and on 15 August and on 26 January every year a special parade of the three wings was held.

Now its premises are used as a parking lot for a nearby hotel.

== See also ==
- Education in India
- List of schools in India
- List of institutions of higher education in Telangana
