= Government College of Commerce and Business Administration =

- Motto: Know. Explore. Grow.
- Established: 2006; 20 years ago
- Affiliations: Panjab University
- Location: Chandigarh, 160036, India; 30.696849°N 76.7438388°E
- Principal: Prof. Dr.Nisha Agarwal
- Website: www.gccbachd.org

Government College of Commerce and Business Administration, Chandigarh also known as GCCBA Chandigarh is a constituent college of the Panjab University, located in Chandigarh, India. It is an initiative of the Chandigarh Administration. GCCBA was established with a view to cater to growing demand for commerce and management education in Chandigarh. Since its inception, the college is co-educational.

The Government College of Commerce and Business Administration (GCCBA) is the only college in Chandigarh that deals exclusively with the streams of commerce and management. Approval to start the college was granted by General (Retired) Sunith Francis Rodrigues, the then Governor of Punjab, and Administrator, UT Chandigarh in September 2006.

== History ==
The Governor of Punjab and Administrator of Union Territory of Chandigarh, General (Retd.) Sunith Francis Rodrigues, PVSM, VSM, accorded the approval for the start of the Government College of Commerce and Business Administration on 15 September 2006.

After grant of affiliation by Panjab University, the first academic session (2007–08) commenced with 185 students. Presently there are around 600 students on the rolls.

== Campus ==
The institute shifted to its permanent campus in Sector 50 in October 2015.

== Academics ==
=== Academic programmes ===
GCCBA is affiliated with Panjab University and presently offers the following courses :

- Bachelor of Business Administration
- Bachelor of Commerce (Honours) in Business Finance, Accounting and E-Commerce
- Bachelor of Commerce (General)
- Master of Commerce
- Bachelor of Computer Application

=== Awards and recognition ===
The institute was ranked Chandigarh's 2nd Best Commerce College in 2014 by India Today.

=== Placement and Career Guidance ===
Placement drives and career cell sessions are organised in campus on regular basis.

== Student life ==
=== Cultural and Non-Academic Activities ===
Cultural and non academic activities like Dramatics, Public Speaking, Quizzing, Literary, Arts, Music and Sports also mark an important feature in the life of a student of GCCBA Chandigarh.

GCCBA students have won awards in many prestigious college, university, regional and national level competitions.

The annual Cultural, Management and IT Fest - YuvClique is held in the month of February.

=== Societies and Activities ===
- National Service Scheme (NSS)
- Management Club - GESTIONE
- Environment Society - AVNI
- Literary Society
- Gender Sensitization Society
- Drugs Awareness Society
- I.T Society
- Anti-Stress Society

== See also ==
- Education in India
- Literacy in India
- List of institutions of higher education in Punjab, India
