= Vatika High School for Deaf & Dumb =

Location
- Sector 19-B, Opposite Main Bazaar; Chandigarh; India; 30.727575°N 76.7942362°E

Information
- School type: Special school
- Established: 1991-92
- Status: Open
- Principal: Neelam Dutta
- Enrollment: 120 (2013)
- Classes: 1st–10th
- Affiliations: PSEB

Vatika High School for Deaf & Dumb is a special school for deaf and dumb children in Sector 19-B of Chandigarh. Neelam Dutta is the current principal of the school. Affiliated by the Punjab School Education Board, Mohali, the school runs classes from 1st to 10th.

Besides education the school provides training vocational in the field of home science, physical education, drawing & painting, computer, beauty parlor, cutting & tailoring, photostat, making of greeting cards, block-printing, etc.

== See also ==
- Education in India
