= St. Paul's High School, Belgaum =

St. Paul's High School

Location
- Belgaum, Karnataka; India; 15°51′14.15″N 74°30′12.21″E

Information
- Type: Private primary and secondary school
- Motto: Latin: Induamur arma lucis! (Let's put on the armour of light!)
- Religious affiliation: Catholicism
- Denomination: Jesuits
- Established: 1856; 170 years ago
- Sister school: St. Joseph’s Canossian Convent School
- School district: Belgaum
- Rector: Fr. Santosh Vas, S. J.
- Principal: Fr. Eric Mathias, S. J.
- Headmistress: Lidwina Mendonca
- Teaching staff: around 50
- Grades: K-10
- Gender: Boys
- Enrollment: 2,256
- Campus: Camp, Belgaum - 590001
- Houses: Loyola; Gonzaga; Berchman; Xavier
- Colours: Blue, gold, green and red
- Newspaper: The Paulite
- Affiliations: Karnataka State Secondary Educational Examination Board; Goa Province Jesuits
- Website: www.sphs.edu.in

St. Paul's High School is a private Catholic primary and secondary school for boys located in the Cantonment area in Belgaum, North Karnataka, India. Founded by the Jesuits in 1856, the school is located adjacent to its sister school, St. Joseph’s Canossian Convent School and the Cathedral of Our Lady of the Family Rosary of Fatima.

== History ==
The school was founded in 1856. Fr. Charmilliot, an Austrian Jesuit, first stepped into the compound of St Paul's as the chaplain of Our Lady of Mount Carmel chapel, that existed on these premises. From that day the Jesuits never left the premises even though their nationality might have changed. First the school had Austrian and German Jesuit fathers. They were replaced by the Portuguese Jesuits. Now Indian Jesuits of the Goa Province run the school.

=== Motto ===
The motto of the school is Induamur Arma Lucis – "Let us put on the armour of light", which means "Be a light to others, bring light to the world around you by your words, and above all by your actions."

=== Growth ===
Beginning with four classrooms and 60–70 students, the school has grown to over 2000 students. Though it was started primarily for the Catholics, it has opened its doors to students of all religions, castes, ethnic backgrounds, and colour. Scholarships and help are provided to those who can't afford the tuition.

=== Academic standing ===
The school received recognition on 30 November 1868 from Bombay University as a part of Bombay Presidency. The first batch appeared in the Matriculation Examination in 1917. It was given government grant-in-aid already from 1917.

The Inspector Mr. H. Davies wrote in 1936:

The upper classes are extremely well graded and taught, the School’s record in the Matriculation Examination being one which over a long period has entitled it to respect….The percentage of passes (24 sent up and 20 passed) is therefore 83% as against the University general average of 35% and the school stands first among the English Teaching Schools of the Presidency. The best English education is given here and conversation in English is compulsory unlike some of the other schools in the city. Discipline in language, dressing and mannerisms is the priority of this rich institution. It has earned distinctions at ten times the average rate for the Presidency and has once more secured the Latin prize.

=== Reorienting goals ===
In 1974 there was rethinking about education, especially in Jesuit institutions. The boarding had for some years a supplementary section called the orphanage, which catered to destitute children whose parents had died in plagues or other epidemics. In 1974 there was a rethinking of the hostel project when the old hostel was closed. In its place the hostel reopened its doors to the boys from the villages around. Their education is highly subsidized.

=== Jubilees ===
- In 1981 the school celebrated its 125th jubilee.
- In 2006 the school celebrated its 150th jubilee.
- In 2016 the school celebrated its

160 th jubilee

150th year celebrations
The 150th year celebrations of the school were held on 10 February 2006 along with the Passing Out parade of the SSLC jubilee batch. Throughout the year the school conducted extracurricular activities and celebrated its jubilee. There was a cultural fest in October 2006 known as the Anand Utsav. The school held the valedictory ceremony of its 150th year from 7 to 10 December. On 7 December the school held celebrations for the students and parents. In the morning there were programmes and a magic show by Junior Marcos. On 8 December there was a grand celebration for the ex-students and teachers. Prayer services and dances were held on the occasion. On 9 December the main valedictory event was held. On this occasion a skit depicted the events from the birth of man to St Paul's in its present state. On 19 December Shaan sang.

St. Paul's high School hosts an inter- College Cultural fest 'Kronos' which hosts Competitions for most schools in Belagavi. On 17 December 2016, nearly 3638 ex students had a reunion and were successful to make a Guinness world record for the highest attendees for a school reunion

== Culture ==
=== Passing Out parade ===
The school conducts a Passing Out parade for the SSLC batch in February each year. The junior students produce dance performances for entertainment. The high school students of Std VIII and IX salute the Xth Std students. The SSLC students march for the last time with lamps, to the sound of the song "Now is the Hour". After the Passing Out parade, the students pose for photos with their friends and teachers. Till recently the passing out batch wore white shirts and black pants with a tie. Now they wear their normal school dress.

=== Fests ===
The cultural fest is "Arrupe Fest", held in early November organised by staff members. "KRONOS" an inter-school 2 day business -cultural event is also organised by the Cabinet members with their team. In course of this process students learn management skills in aspects of time, money, marketing, public relations etc. It was started by the SPHS Cabinet batch of 2012 and since then it is being carried forward by upcoming batches. KRONOS is also a great platform for students of other schools to showcase their talents.

=== The Paulite ===
The school magazine, The Paulite as it came to be known later on, or the St Paul's Annual as it was known initially, was the brainchild of Fr. Claude Saldhana, S.J., who taught the matriculation class for a number of years. He published the first annual in 1941, mostly with articles by staff members and ex-students. But by the next year the main contributors were the boys.

By 1946 the senior students published the annual. It became a magazine published three to four times a year under the name Sevak. It contained articles by students as well as letters from ex-students. After that, staff members took it upon themselves to publish the magazine changing the name to The Paulite. Fr. Pat de Lima, S.J., with a little help from teachers, in particular from Fr. Thomas Ambrose, S.J., took over and published the magazine for many years until his retirement from the school.

The magazine ceased publication in 1992, then in 2004 some parents, ex-students, began publishing three or four issues a year. In jubilee year 2006, The Paulite was revived, to give students a chance to practice their skills at communication in prose and poetry.

=== Sports ===
Sports include football, hockey, cricket, and athletics. The Father Eddie Memorial Football tournament for senior boys (under 17) and the Indal Trophy (under 15) are conducted every year on St. Pauls "A" ground, while the Royceton Memorial Trophy (under 14) is conducted on "B" ground. The latter draws a large crowd with teams from Goa, Kolhapur, Mumbai, Pune, Bangalore, and other cities.

== Notable alumni ==
- Reynold D'Souza, represented the Kenya Hockey team in the Olympics, 1956 to 1964
- R.S.P. Dalgado, represented the Kenya Hockey team in the Olympics, 1956 to 1964
- Saude George, represented the Kenya Hockey team in the Olympics, 1956 to 1964

== See also ==
- List of Jesuit schools
- List of schools in Karnataka
