= Punjab School Education Board =

Education agency in India

Punjabi Punjab School Education Board
- Logo
- Abbreviation: PSEB
- Formation: 25 November 1969; 56 years ago
- Type: Governmental education board
- Legal status: Active
- Headquarters: Mohali
- Location: "Vidya Bhawan", Phase-8, Mohali, Pin code 160062
- Official language: Punjabi
- Chairman: Dr.Amarpal Singh (Retd I.A.S.)
- Parent organisation: Secretary of School Education (Punjab)
- Affiliations: Government of Punjab, COBSE
- Website: https://www.pseb.ac.in

Punjab School Education Board (Punjabi: ਪੰਜਾਬ ਸਕੂਲ ਸਿੱਖਿਆ ਬੋਰਡ; PSEB) is a school board based in Mohali, Punjab, India. It was founded in 1969 under a legislative act of the Government of Punjab to administer the curriculum taught in public schools in the Punjab state, conduct standardized examinations, conduct administration of scholarships, and publish textbooks. The headquarters of the board are located in SAS Nagar (Mohali), near Chandigarh.

The board is headed by a full-time chairman whose term lasts three years and who technically reports to the Secretary of School Education in the Government of Punjab. The present Chairman of the Board is Dr. Amarpal Singh, I.A.S. (Retd.) and current secretary of the board is Shri Sakatar Singh Bal, PCS.

== Branches ==
The board has the following branches:

- Academic Branch
- Establishment
- Administration
- Conduct
- Secrecy
- Punjab Open School
- Construction Wing
- Account Branch
- Affiliation Branch
- Examination Branch
- Computer Center
- Legal Cell
- P.R.O
- Verification

== Syllabus changes for 2025-26 ==
For the academic session 2025-26, PSEB released a revised subject-wise syllabus for classes 1 through 12. The revisions are aimed at aligning with the National Education Policy (NEP) 2020, emphasizing activity-based learning, coding and digital literacy in middle school, and enhanced depth in senior secondary subject matter.

== Restoration of grade 8 board exams ==
In July 2025, the Punjab Government, through PECTA (Punjab Education Curriculum Training and Assessment Authority), decided to restore board exams for grade 8 students. Also mandated were "assessment tests" (internal evaluation) for grades 5, 6, and 7, with procedures to be framed within a month of the decision.

== Exam date / supplementary / admission timeline adjustments ==
Due to heavy rains and flood disruptions in 2025, the date sheet for class 10 & 12 supplementary (compartment / re-appear) examinations was revised. The original dates in late August were postponed; the revised schedule placed them from 9-11 September 2025.

PSEB extended the admission deadline for classes 8-12 for academic session 2025-26 to 1 August 2025.
