= Council for the Indian School Certificate Examinations =

School education board in India

- Abbreviation: CISCE
- Formation: 1958; 68 years ago
- Type: Non-Governmental Board of School Education
- Legal status: Active
- Headquarters: New Delhi, India
- Official language: English
- Key people: G. Immanuel (Chairman); Joseph Emmanuel (Chief Executive & Secretary); Ricardo Henry Soler (ICSE- Deputy Secretary); Sangeeta Bhatia (ISC- Deputy Secretary)
- Affiliations: 3,300+ schools (2025)
- Website: cisce.org

The Council for the Indian School Certificate Examinations (CISCE) is a non-governmental privately held national-level board of school education in India that conducts the Indian Certificate of Secondary Education (ICSE) Examination for Class X and the Indian School Certificate (ISC) for Class XII.

== History ==
It was established in 1958. Over 2750 schools in India and abroad are affiliated to the CISCE. It is also recognized as a 'Non-Governmental National Board of Secondary Education'. CISCE conducts ICSE exam for Class 10 and ISC exam for Class 12.

== Derozio Award ==
The Derozio Award is an annual prize awarded to the top Indian educationists by the Council for the Indian School Certificate Examinations. It was instituted in 1999 in memory of Henry Louis Vivian Derozio, a poet and educator from West Bengal. It is the highest award conferred by the council for contributions in the field of education.

== Curriculum ==
The ICSE and ISC syllabi intend to incorporate comprehensive and application-based learning concepts. This board includes an extensive curriculum, particularly in English, which covers a range of literary works, including Shakespearean plays such as Julius Caesar and Macbeth and the George Bernard Shaw play Pygmalion.
