= List of schools in Tamil Nadu =

Following is a list of notable schools in the state of Tamil Nadu in India. There were about more than 23,000 government schools in Tamil Nadu as of May 2024. Apart from that, there are 8,180 middle schools and smart classrooms in 22,931 primary schools where government is planning free internet.

== Coimbatore ==
- Avila Convent
- Sowdeswari Vidyalaya Coimbatore
- Stanes Anglo Indian Higher Secondary School
- Vidya Vanam
- Yuvabharathi Public School

== Erode ==
- Bharathi Vidya Bhavan
- Diamond Jubilee Higher Secondary School
- Railway Mixed High School

== Kumbakonam ==
- Arignar Anna Government Higher Secondary School
- Town Higher Secondary School

== Nagercoil ==
- Alphonsa Matriculation Higher Secondary School, Nagercoil
- Carmel Higher Secondary School, Nagercoil

== Nazareth ==
- Margoschis Higher Secondary School
- St. John's Girls Higher Secondary School

== Ooty ==
- Breeks Memorial School
- Good Shepherd International School
- Hebron School
- St. Joseph's Higher Secondary School

== Palayamkottai ==
- St. Ignatius' Convent Higher Secondary School
- St. Xavier's Higher Secondary School

== Tiruchirappalli ==
- Campion Anglo-Indian Higher Secondary School
- Mahatma Gandhi Centenary Vidyalaya
- R. S. Krishnan Higher Secondary School
- Railway Mixed Higher Secondary School
- St. Johns Vestry Anglo Indian Higher Secondary School
- St. Joseph's School

== Other locations ==
- Ida Scudder School, Kalinjur
- Kodaikanal International School, Kodaikanal
- The Laidlaw Memorial School and Junior College, Ketti
- Lawrence School, Lovedale
- Loyola Higher Secondary School
- Montfort School, Yercaud
- RMK Residential School, Kavaraipettai
- Sacred Heart Matriculation School, Kayyunni
- Sainik School, Amaravathinagar
- Sethupathi Higher Secondary School, Madurai
- Sir Ramaswami Mudaliar Higher Secondary School, Ambattur
- Sri V. V. Higher Secondary School, Venkatachalapuram
- St. Antony's Higher Secondary School, Thanjavur
- St. Arul Anandar School, Orur
- St. Joseph's Higher Secondary School, Cuddalore
- St. Xavier's Higher Secondary School, Thoothkudi
- Stanes Anglo Indian Higher Secondary School, Coonoor
- Thriveni Academy, Oragadam
- Veveaham School, Dharapuram
- Victoria Girls Higher Secondary School
