= The Laidlaw Memorial School and Junior College, Ketti =

Laidlaw Memorial School
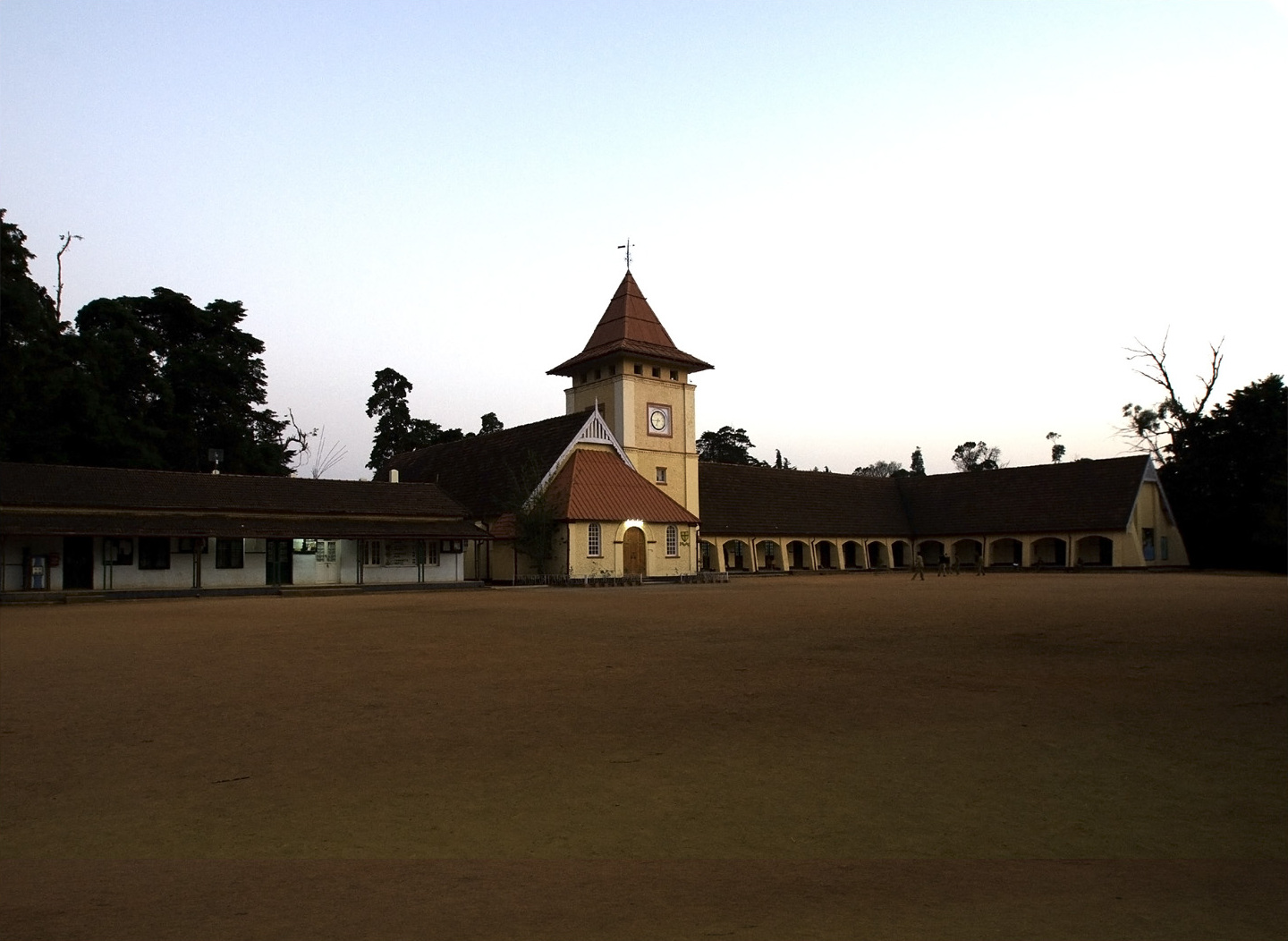
- Ketti, Tamil Nadu; India

Information
- Type: Public school
- Motto: Self reliance
- Established: 1914; 112 years ago
- Founders: John Breeden and Robert Laidlaw
- Principal: Gary Everett
- Enrollment: 600 (approximately)
- Website: www.laidlawschool.org

The Laidlaw Memorial School of St. George's Homes, Ketti is an English-medium school in Ketti, Tamil Nadu, India.

== History ==
The school originated as an orphanage, St. George's Homes, in Kodaikanal. The founder was John Breeden, and Robert Laidlaw contributed funds. The institution moved to Ketti in 1922.

The school, first recognised by the Education Department of Madras as a free primary school, was raised to the status of a high school in 1944.

== Notable staff ==
Mark Alexander Wynter-Blyth (1906–1963), naturalist, was a housemaster of the prep school, then headmaster of the Laidlaw Memorial School in Ketti, Tamil Nadu from 1941.

== Media ==
The school appeared in the Tamil film Panneer Pushpangal.

== See also ==
- St. Joseph's Higher Secondary School, Ooty
- Breeks Memorial School, Ooty
- Hebron School, Ooty
- Lawrence School, Lovedale, Ooty
- Stanes Hr.Sec. School, Coonoor
- Good Shepherd International School, Ooty
- Rajkumar College, Rajkot
