= RMK Residential School =

Location
- Chennai, Tamil Nadu; India; 13.360169°N 80.144612°E

Information
- Type: Private
- Motto: A School Called Life
- Established: 2007
- Principal: Sapna N Sankhla
- Website: www.rmkresidential.ac.in

RMK Residential School is an international co-educational boarding school situated at Kavaraipettai in the south Indian state of Tamil Nadu.

The school is 35 kilometres (22 mi) by road from Chennai. It was founded in 2007 by R.S.Munirathinam. The school accepts students from standards (grades) 5-12 and is affiliated with the Central Board of Secondary Education (CBSE).

In addition to academics, the school offers sports and other activities including Go-karting, horse riding, billiards, swimming, tennis, football, basketball, volleyball, table tennis, cricket, chess, yoga, music and art.

RMK Residential School has an memorandum of understanding with Bowen Secondary School, Singapore for a School Twinning Program. As per the Program, both schools would have an exchange of students and teachers every year.

The school is headed by principal Sapna N Sankhla.

== See also ==
- List of schools in India
- RMK Engineering College
- RMD Engineering College
