= Mark Alexander Wynter-Blyth =

English naturalist (1906–1963)

Mark Alexander Wynter-Blyth (occasionally unhyphenated; 15 August 1906 – 16 April 1963) was an English schoolteacher and amateur naturalist who wrote one of the first field guides to the butterflies of the Indian region. He was also involved in censuses of the Asiatic lion at the Gir forest.

== Life ==
Wynter-Blyth was born at Harrow-on-the-Hill, Middlesex to Christiana Mary (nee Armstrong) and Meredith Blyth - she was the daughter of the Medical Officer for Newcastle-upon-Tyne and Meredith was a public analyst and analytical chemist working on coal by-products for Brighton and Eastbourne Corporations (his father Alexander Wynter Blyth was another public analyst, chemist and toxicologist). Mark studied at Sedbergh School, Yorkshire and Magdalene College, Cambridge. He took an interest in nature study while still a student and moved to India in 1936 to become a house master at Bishop Cotton School. He later became headmaster of the preparatory school and a meeting with A. E. Jones (1877-1947), a well-known amateur naturalist in Shimla, led to an interest in butterflies. In 1941 he moved to the Nilgiris to take up a position as headmaster at St. George's School in Ketti; the school, which had been first recognized by the Education Department of Madras as a free primary school, was raised to the status of a high school in 1944 during his tenure.

During the war, he was called to service but found unfit for active service and declined a staff appointment. In 1946 he moved to Saurashtra as a private tutor and from 1948 to 1963 until his death, he was the principal of the Rajkumar College, Rajkot, a school founded and run by the Princely Order of Kathiawar. In April 1950 and again in April 1955 Wynter-Blyth conducted censuses of lions in the Gir forest. In 1950 he estimated 179-187 adults and 87 young ones. In 1955 he reported 141 males, 100 females and 49 cubs. His book, Butterflies of the Indian Region published by the Bombay Natural History Society in 1957 was very influential and for a long time the only handy guide to butterflies in India.

== Death ==
Wynter-Blyth died in Leysin, Switzerland of coronary thrombosis on 16 April 1963.

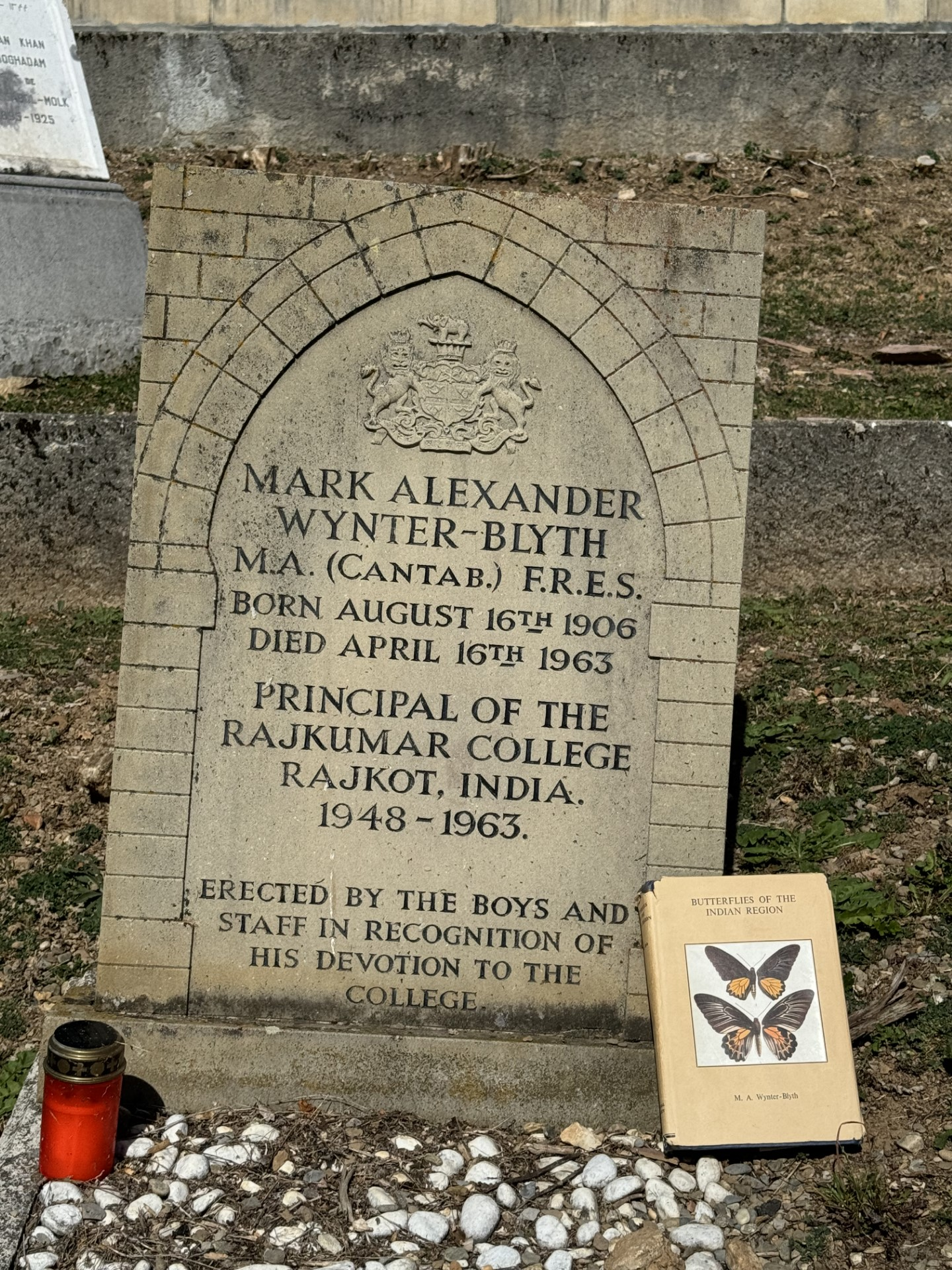
Wynter-Blyth's grave in Leysin, Switzerland, with a copy of his 1957 book, Butterflies of the Indian Region
