= Rathika =

Rathika is a given name. People with the given name include:

- Rathika Sitsabaiesan
- Rathika Ramasamy
