= Hebron School =

Coordinates: 11.418605°N 76.713973°E

Location
- Hebron School, Lushington Hall; Ootacamund, Tamil Nadu 643001; India

Information
- Type: Christian private international school
- Motto: Deo Supremo (For God above all)
- Religious affiliation: Protestant
- Established: 1899; 127 years ago
- Principal: Mr Richard Naylor
- Grades: Preschool–13
- Enrollment: 370 approx. 8 pre-school 77 elementary school 62 junior high school 225 senior high school
- Campus size: 22 acres (8.9 ha)
- Campus type: Rural
- Colours: Blue and gold
- Publication: Zenith; Hebron Highlights
- Alumni: Old Hebronites
- Website: hebronooty.org

Hebron School is a Christian co-educational private boarding school in the hill station known as Ooty, in Tamil Nadu, southern India. The school follows the British school system and offers study for IGCSEs, AS and A levels.

== Notable alumni ==
- Alastair Cutting (born 1960) – Bishop of Woolwich Alastair Cutting is a Church of England bishop.
- Rae Langton (born 1961) - Knightbridge Professor of Philosophy, Cambridge University
- Karan Faridoon Bilimoria, Baron Bilimoria of Chelsea, CBE, DL (born 1961) — founder member and Chairman of Cobra Beer
- Kalki Koechlin (born 1983) – French-Indian Hindi film actress
- Serena Kern-Libera (born 1988) — Swiss-Indian singer and songwriter
- Pranav Mohanlal (born 1990) – Indian Malayalam film actor
- Gautham Karthik (born 1990) – Indian Tamil film actor
- Kynan Chenai (born 1991) - Indian sport shooter
- Apoorva Elizabeth Mittra (born 1991) — Indian model

== Leavers' Service Speakers ==
- 2007 – Sir Richard Stagg KCMG, British diplomat, the then British High Commissioner to India

== See also ==
- St. Joseph's Higher Secondary School, Ooty
- Breeks Memorial School, Ooty
- The Laidlaw Memorial School and Junior College, Ketti, Ooty
- Lawrence School, Lovedale, Ooty
- Stanes Hr.Sec. School, Coonoor
- Good Shepherd International School, Ooty
