= St. Joseph's Higher Secondary School =

St.Joseph's Higher Secondary School may refer to the following schools:

== Nagaland, India ==
- St. Joseph's Higher Secondary School, Viswema

== Tamil Nadu, India ==
- St. Joseph's Higher Secondary School, Ooty
- St. Joseph's Higher Secondary School (Cuddalore)

== Kerala, India ==
- St. Joseph's Higher Secondary School, Thiruvananthapuram
