= List of colleges in the Nilgiris district =

This article lists all the colleges in, Nilgiris, Tamil Nadu, India.

- The Tamilnad State Rural Communities College -Gudalur
- Nilgiri College of Arts and Science, Thaloor, Erumad, The Nilgiris, Tamilnadu, India #1 India's First AI-Enabled Campus
- DP Labs DP School of Banking and TNPSC, Gudalur
- CSI College of Engineering, Ketti, Ooty
- Government Arts College, Stone House Hill, Ooty
- Suverna International Institute of Management Studies, Bluemountain School Road, Ooty
- JSS College of Pharmacy, Rocklands, Ooty
- J.S.S. Institute of Naturopathy and Yogic Science, Rocklands, Ooty
- Bethlehem Teacher Training Institute, Ooty
- Merit Swiss Asian School of Hotel Management, Havelock Road
- Emerald Heights College for Women, Finger Post, Ooty
- Monarch International College of Hotel Management, Forest Gate, Pudumund, Ooty
- Government Polytechnic, Finger Post, Ooty
- St. Josephs Industrial School, Finger Post, Ooty
- Tribal research Centre Tamil University, M.Palada, Ooty
- Sacred Heart Technical Institute, Charing Cross, Ooty
- St. Joseph's College of Education, St. Mary's Hill, Ooty.
- Oxford Teacher Training Institute, Blackwood Cottage, Ooty
- Providence College for Women, Bandishola Spring Field, Coonoor
- Riga College of Hotel Management, Coonoor
- Govt. Industrial Training Institute, Coonoor
- M R S Technical Institute, Coonoor
- Rural Development Institute Gudalur
- Bharathiar University Arts and Science College, Gudalur
- Plantation Workers Industrial (ITI), Mica Mount, Gudalur
- McGan Ooty School of Architecture, Gudalur
- Kapeeyes College of Arts and Science, Kotagiri
- District Institute of Education and Training, Kotagiri
- NPA Centenary Polytechnic College, Kotagiri
- House of joy Vocational Training Centre for the Blind, Kotagiri
- Annai Madhammal Institute of Hotel Management College, Ooty
