= Sri V. V. Higher Secondary School =

Sri Varatha Venkataramana Higher Secondary School
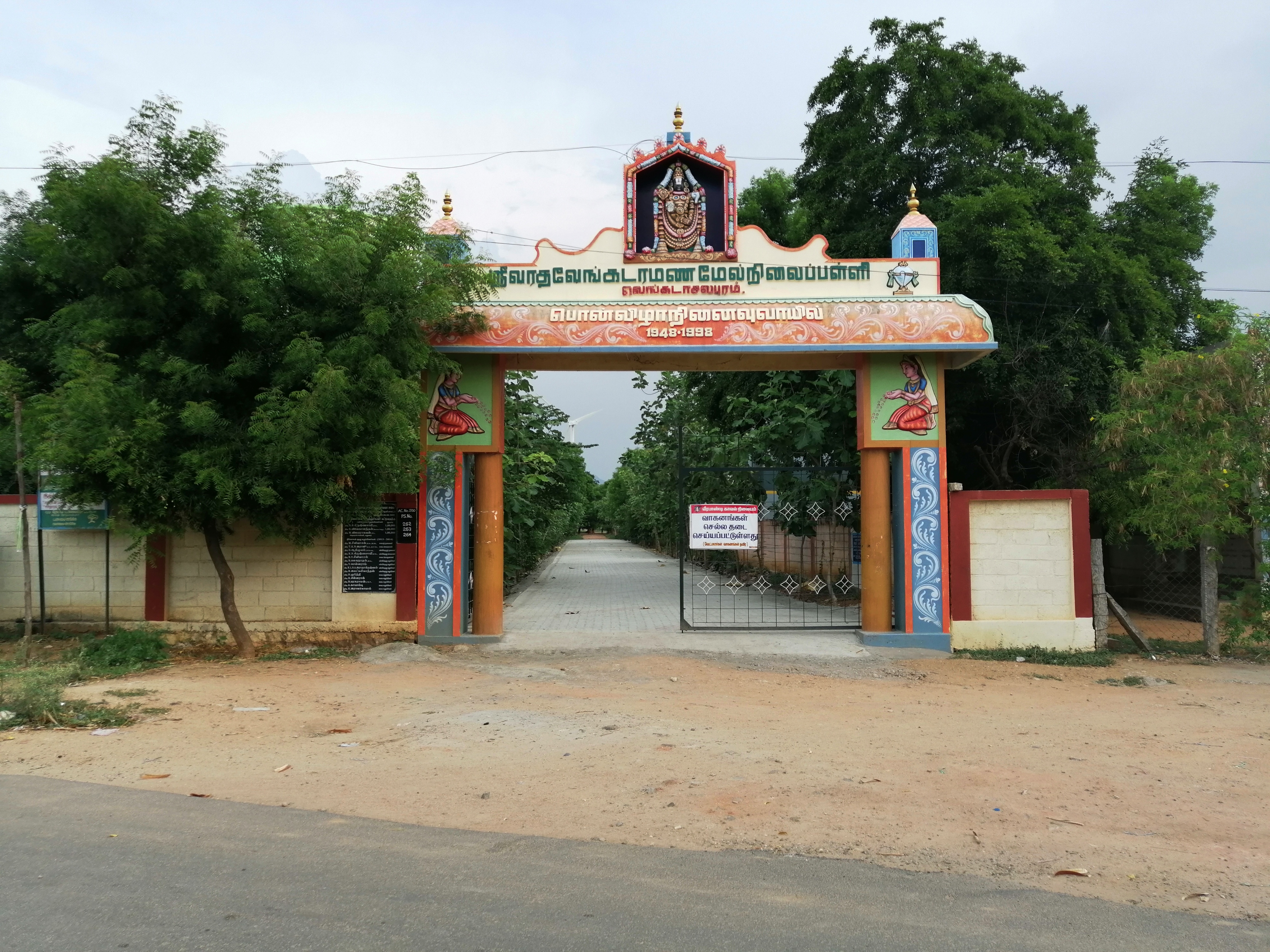
- The school's north entrance in 2019

Location
- High School Street, School Road; Venkatachalapuram, India, Tamil Nadu, 625534; India
- Coordinates: 9.916858°N 77.471358°E

Information
- School type: Government Aided, Day school
- Motto: கற்க கசடற (Learn Thoroughly)
- Established: 1932
- Founder: Kamma kula mahajana sangam, Venkatachalapuram
- Status: Active
- School board: Tamil Nadu Board of Secondary Education
- School district: Theni
- Authority: Sri Varatha Venkataramana vidhyalaya sabha
- Session: Day
- School code: UDISE: 33250700203
- Headmaster: Mr. C.Dhinakaran
- Grades: 6 to 12
- Gender: Mixed gender
- Age: 10 years to 17 years
- Language: தமிழ்
- Campus size: 70.5 Acres
- Campus type: Village

The Sri V. V. Higher Secondary School is a mixed-gender school for secondary and higher secondary level students located in Venkatachalapuram, Theni District, Tamil Nadu, India. It is government aided school.

The expanded full form of the School name is Sri Varatha Venkataramana Higher secondary school). The Present Head master is Mr. C. Dhinakaran who is a Mathematics Teacher. The Assistant Headmaster is Mr. Parasuram, drawing Teacher.

The school has two Entrances. One facing northwards along the Venkatachalapuram–Veerapandi Road near Village Library and Sree Anugraha Anjaneyar Temple which are nearby. Another Entrance facing Eastwards along the Village Street which ends in the road of Venkatachalapuram - Odaipatti Road.

== Connectivity and public transportation ==
Since the school has two Entrances facing the main roads of the village, it has good road connectivity. Theni - kuppinaickenpatti, Theni - odaipatti, Theni - Venkatachalapuram (V. C. Puram) are the main bus routes that run through this village directly. Besides Public Transports run by TNSTC, there are few Private buses run through this route.

There are various State Express Transport Corporation (Tamil Nadu) buses & Private Buses are being operated from Theni to Various major cities of Tamil Nadu including Chennai. Recently, two private Bus operator named IvarTravels and Grape City Travels are operating Bus service from Odaipatti to chennai. Since, this route runs through the village Venkatachalapuram, there is direct bus connectivity to Chennai from this village.

== School amenities ==
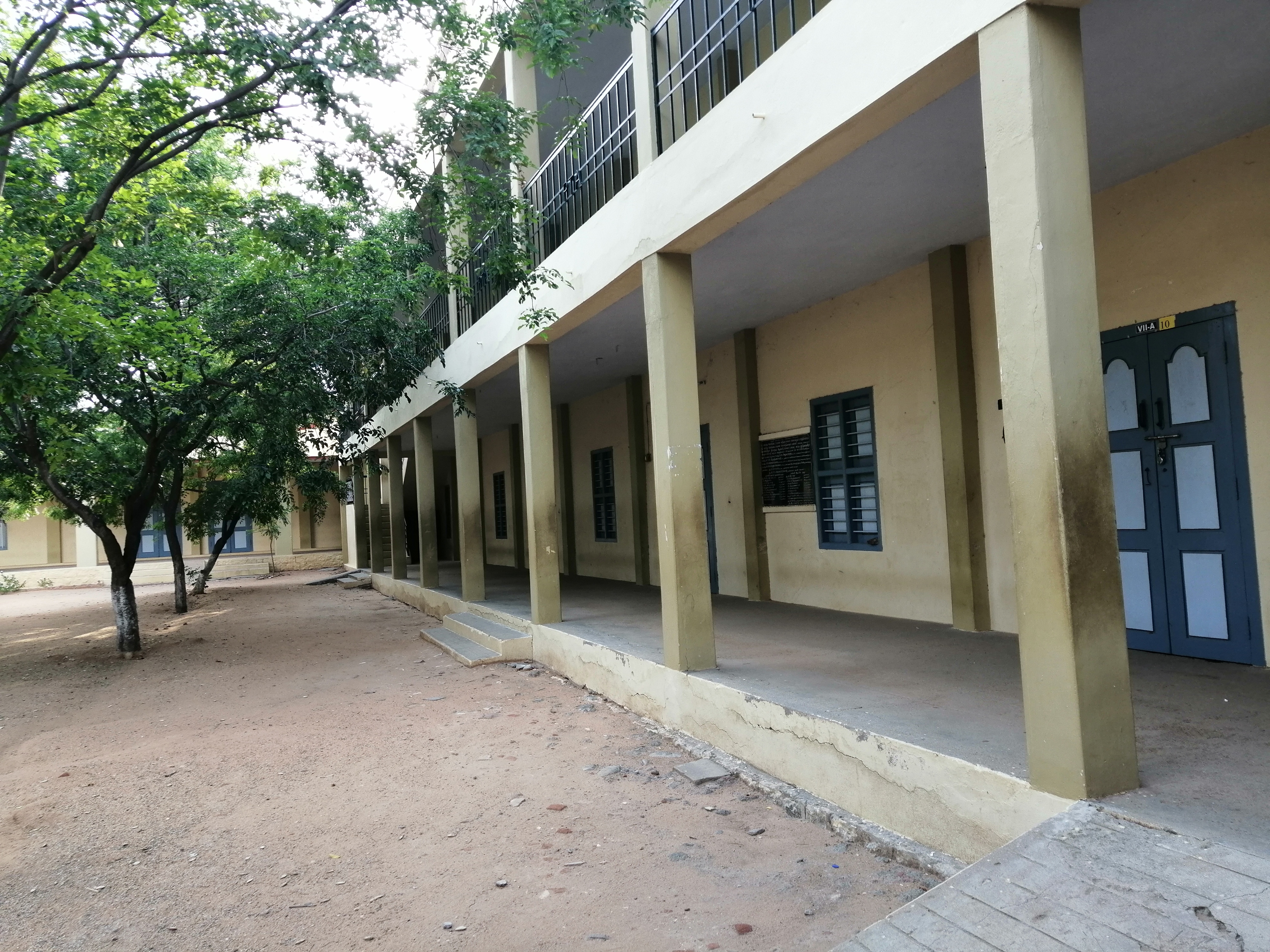
School class rooms

Sri V. V. Higher secondary school is spread over 70.5 acre area in the south west corner of the village Venkatachalapuram. Hence, School has Ample playground for the students. School lab has physics, chemistry, botany and zoology segments separately. School has separate Botanical and Herbal Garden of its own. The School contains numerous species of trees in its campus which make the school greener and pleasant for study.

This school has grade 6 to 12. Medium of the study in this school is Tamil. It has been proposed to impart English medium teaching for 6th grade students from the Academic year 2019–2020 as allowed by the Government of Tamil Nadu.

After 04.00PM school conducts yoga classes for both boys and girls at the ground under the supervision of Physical education and Training (P. E. T) Teacher. School also provides wide variety of options for the students' sports activity. This school is providing boxing among other sports such as football, volleyball, basketball, hockey, and kabaddi.

== Alumni meet ==
On 26.05.2019, Alumni Students who had studied in this school during academic year of 1991-1993 had gathered there for Alumni reunion meet. Around 120 Alumni students had been reunited on this day in this school through Social media in general and WhatsApp in particular. This function was presided over by the School Headmaster Mr. Dinakaran in the august presence of School secretary Mr. Narayanan.

The Alumni students honored their teachers by presenting gifts and momentum. They introduced themselves with the family on the stage. They have contributed a sizable amount towards the school development.
