= St. Xavier's Higher Secondary School, Palayamkottai =

- Palayamkottai, Tirunelveli District, Tamil Nadu; India

Information
- Type: Private secondary school
- Motto: Latin: Veritate Lumen et Vita (Life and Light through Truth)
- Religious affiliation: Catholicism
- Denomination: Jesuits
- Established: 1880; 146 years ago
- Rector: Fr. Britto Vincent, SJ
- Headmaster: Fr. Agastin Jhon Peter, SJ
- Gender: Boys
- Website: stxaviershsspalay.com

St. Xavier's Higher Secondary School is a private Catholic secondary school located in Palayamkottai in the Tirunelveli district of Tamil Nadu, India. The school was established by the Jesuits in 1880 and provides co-educational schooling for students from standards VI through XII. The school includes a hostel for 300 boys and has an active alumni association, founded in 1990.

== Chronology ==
- 1898: recognition of school by the Director of Public Instructions
- 1899: boarding house established, that became a hostel with 10 boys in 1903
- 1910: Secondary School Leaving Certificate (SSLC) scheme adopted
- 1917: new high school building inaugurated
- 1922: newly built hostel inaugurated, today's Sacred Heart Hostel
- 1935: Scouting movement introduced
- 1940s: introduction of school magazine, literary and debating societies, Hindi in curriculum, National Cadet Corps
- 1950s: lunch for needy students; co-operative and credit union for teachers; engineering course; described as "glory years"; former teacher John P. Leonard SJ consecrated archbishop of Madurai; teacher Rajarethinam A. Sundaram consecrated bishop of Tanjore; graduate Peter Fernando would later become archbishop of Madurai; Our Lady of the Assumption church on campus consecrated in 1959
- 1980s: Centenary Block built; students secured first and second ranks in SSLC exam (1982); cultural week initiated
- 1990s: new outreach programs for underprivileged, rural, and refugee students (Loyola Study Centre, LASAC movement, STAAR charitable association run by students); modern biology lab; computer education from standard VI through XII
- 2000: Arrupe administrative block built; Fr. Y.S Yagoo SJ introduced more extracurricular activities and state level tournaments in football and hockey, receiving the Dr. Radhakrishnan award in 2010.
- 2011: entrance enhanced with gardens and wider roads

== Activities ==
A thorough tour of the campus is provided online. School activities include: Consumer Club, Eco Club, Arts & Crafts, Leveil Reading Club, Road Safety Patrol, Ignatian Band, Veeramamunivar Tamil Literary Association, Verdier Science Club, Arrupe Dispensary, and Arrupe Inter-Religious Centre. The boys have won state championships in hockey, volleyball, football, and in individual events in swimming, athletics, and Silambam (second place).

== See also ==
- List of Jesuit schools
- List of schools in Tamil Nadu
