= Ida Scudder School =

Private school in Kalinjur

Location
- No.1, Kalinjur Main Road, Vellore, Tamil Nadu; India; 12.945237°N 79.13469°E

Information
- Type: Private, Non-residential, Co-educational
- Motto: Lighted to Lighten
- School board: Indian Certificate of Secondary Education (ICSE) / Indian School Certificate (ISC)
- Chairman: Dr Vikram Mathews, Director, CMCH
- Principal: Swarna Joshua
- Affiliations: The Council for the Indian School Certificate Examinations (CISCE)
- Correspondent: Dr Rajiv Karthik
- Website: http://www.scudderschool.ac.in/

Ida Scudder School is a private, non-residential, co-educational school located at Kalinjur in Vellore, Tamil Nadu, India. The school is affiliated with Council for the Indian School Certificate Examinations (CISCE), and has classes from Std.1 to Higher Secondary.

== History ==
The school is named after the American medical missionary, Dr. Ida S. Scudder, who founded the Christian Medical College, Vellore. The school was started on 13 June 1969 by a group of faculty of the Christian Medical College, when there were only a few schools in Vellore. The initial capital for this venture was raised by the faculty by providing a month's salary of theirs. The salary for the employees in the initial months were paid by some parents.

== Affiliations ==
The school is affiliated to Council for the Indian School Certificate Examinations (CISCE), New Delhi. Students are prepared for the Indian Certificate of Secondary Education (ICSE) examinations at the Tenth grade level, and for the Indian School Certificate (ISC) examinations at the Twelfth grade level.

== Annual events ==
Some of the events organised around the year include the annual sports day, march past, the variety entertainment show, 10th grade and 12th grade talent shows, farewells, IHA's and the Christmas program.

== Academic and extra-curricular performance ==
The school has performed and won prizes at state and national levels. The school won the first rank in Vellore district in the State-level Science Talent Search Examination conducted for Sixth Standard students by the Unified Council in 2008. The school also won the overall championship trophy in the mathematical competition for school students conducted by the VIT University in 2011. About 810 students from 25 schools took part in the contest.
