= St. Joseph's Higher Secondary School, Ooty =

St. Joseph's Higher Secondary School

Location
- St. Mary's Hill; Ooty, Tamil Nadu, 643001; India; 11.409°N 76.693°E

Information
- Type: Higher secondary school
- Religious affiliation: Christianity
- Patron saint: Saint Joseph
- Established: 1820; 206 years ago
- Status: Open
- School board: Tamil Nadu Board of Secondary Education
- Grades: Class 6 - Class 12
- Gender: Male
- Language: English
- Campus: Rural
- Colour
- Sports: Cricket, Hand ball and Football

St. Joseph's Higher Secondary School is a boys' school located in the scenic hill station town Ooty, which is part of The Nilgiris district in Tamil Nadu, India. The school was started by Christian missionaries in 1820.

== Location ==
The school is incorporated in the locale of St. Mary's Hill in the town, at a distance of about one kilometer from Ooty bus stand and Railway station. The location of the school enables student access from even remote rural parts of the district. The school is considered to be located in an environment ideal for students' education as the surroundings are quiet and free from noise pollution.

== Activities ==
The school takes part in sporting activities like cricket, handball, football etc. Cultural activities organized in the school includes Teachers day celebrations and an Annual Sports Meet. In 2010, the school conducted the 70th Annual Sports Meet. The school also engages in other activities like organizing the annual dog show in the school ground.

== Facilities ==
The school offers institutional transport facilities for its students of the school in the form of buses. This transport facility is extended to students from both urban and rural areas surrounding Ooty.

== See also ==
- Breeks Memorial School, Ooty
- Hebron School, Ooty
- The Laidlaw Memorial School and Junior College, Ketti, Ooty
- Lawrence School, Lovedale, Ooty
- Stanes Hr.Sec. School, Coonoor
- Good Shepherd International School, Ooty
