= Thomas Stanes =

Anglo-Indian businessman (1837–1905)

- Born: 6 January 1837; London, United Kingdom
- Died: 30 January 1905 (aged 68); Coonoor, India
- Resting place: All Saints Church, Coonoor
- Education: College House, Edmonton, London
- Occupations: Businessman and philanthropist
- Relatives: Robert Stanes (brother)

Thomas Stanes (6 January 1837 – 30 January 1905) was an Anglo-Indian businessman and philanthropist.

== Early life ==
Stanes was the sixth of nine children of James Stanes, a glass and china shipping merchant of London, and his wife Sarah Poultney Worth. After education at College House, Edmonton, London, he arrived at Madras, Tamil Nadu, India, on 26 June 1855 on the MS Hindustan. He was the elder brother of the celebrated Anglo-Indian businessman Sir Robert Stanes. Both Thomas and Robert founded Stanes schools in Tamil Nadu, Robert at Coimbatore in 1862 and Thomas at Coonoor in 1858.

Stanes opened the Adderley Estate shortly after his arrival. He purchased the Colacumbie Coffee Estate in 1865. These two businesses eventually led to the formation of the company T. Stanes and Co. in 1886 by combining the interests of Robert and Thomas Stanes. The company expanded beyond the coffee business into manufacturing, agricultural machinery, agrichemicals and the motor trade. T. Stanes and Co. was still trading 125 years after its foundation, although it is no longer owned by the Stanes family.

== Organisations started ==
- In 1858, Stanes started The Coonoor Day School, popularly known as The Stanes School, in Coonoor, India. The school is one of the oldest in India, still in existence.
- In 1861, Stanes started T Stanes & Co along with his brother Robert Stanes.

== Death ==
Thomas Stanes died after being thrown from his horse on 30 January 1905. His body has been buried at the All Saints Church, Coonoor.
