= Carmel Higher Secondary School =

Location
- Ramanputhoor; Nagercoil, Tamil Nadu, 629004; India; 8°10′06″N 77°25′21″E

Information
- Type: Government-aided school
- Motto: Latin: Magisque ad lucem vitae (Ever higher, to life through light)
- Religious affiliation: Catholicism
- Denomination: Jesuits
- Established: 1922; 104 years ago
- Founder: Carmelites of Quilon Diocese
- Principal: Fr. Mariya Bastin Durai, SJ
- Teaching staff: 67
- Grades: Sixth to twelve
- Gender: Boys
- Campus size: 20 hectares (50 acres)
- Website: www.carmelhsschool.in

Carmel Higher Secondary School is a century-old private Catholic secondary school for boys, located at Carmel Nagar, Ramanputhoor, in Nagercoil, in the Kanyakumari District, in the state of Tamil Nadu, India.

The school was established in 1922 by Bishop Aloysius Benziger of the Diocese of Quilon and is now located on a 8.1-hectare (20-acre) campus. The school came under the Diocese of Kottar after its bifurcation on 26 May 1930 and is presently entrusted to the Jesuits for administrative management.

The Diocese had its association with the Jesuits since 1540’s when the dedicated Spanish Missionary St. Francis Xavier (1506-1552), co-founder of the Society of Jesus set his foot on the soil of Kottar about 1500 years after the advent of St. Thomas in 52 A.D.

== History ==
The school was built by the Carmelite nuns in 1922 on a 8-hectare (20-acre) land. The nuns constructed a 91-metre (300 ft) long single block of building at Ramanputhur, in the vicinity of Nagercoil Town and started the school.

The Carmel Higher Secondary School was established there with the help of the Carmelites by Bishop Aloysius Benziger of Quilon Diocese as an English-medium middle school in 1922. The building was solemnly blessed by Fr. Lucas, OCD, the Prior General of the Carmelites. It began with the preparatory class and first form under the management of Bernard Gonsalvez, and with Antony Pereira, B.A., as the first headmaster. In 1925 they were succeeded by Paul and Martin Fernandez. By then it was a full Middle School with 120 students and 6 teachers, of whom 40 were boarders.

Aloysious Benzigar, OCD, the Catholic Bishop of Quilon, undertook to open an English school together with boarding quarters for the use of Catholics of the southern and Tamil-speaking portion of the diocese. Benziger was a Swiss-born Carmelite of the Belgian province who spent 1905 to 1931 at Carmel Hill, Trivandrum. He determined in 1919 to refound a Carmelite community in Goa during the third centenary of their martyrdom, in 1938.

After the Diocese of Kottar was formed, in 1936 the first Bishop of Kottar, Lawrence Pereira, enlarged the school to the status of a high school. According to the regulations of the Directorate of School Education, the school was given permanent recognition as per the regulation No 1952/Z117 of 04-12-1934.

The appointment of Bishop Roche Agniswamy S.J, a Jesuit, in 1939 as Bishop of the Diocese was another occasion that strengthened the ties of the Diocese with the Jesuits.

From 1936 to 1946, the Brothers of Charity from England managed the school. From 1947 to 1950 the Salesians of Don Bosco took over but returned it to the Diocese of Kottar in 1950. From June 1959 Jesuits from Madurai province took charge and added the Higher Secondary School division. From June 1986 to June 1994 it reverted to the Salesians of Don Bosco. The Jesuits from Madurai Province returned in July 1994 and have managed the school since.

Today there is a statue of Jesus Christ in the entrance of the school, where the inauguration of the school was held. There was once a building, demolished to construct Machado Lab in 2000, situated in front of today’s canteen. It was the first ever building of Carmel Higher Secondary School, Nagercoil.

Economically disadvantaged students receive assistance through the waiving of school fees, a morning meal scheme, and various works of charity in collaboration with the Carmel Alumni Association.

== Activities ==
Activities and organizations include National Cadet Corps, National Service Scheme, Scouts, Junior Red Cross, GSP (Government Services Project), Carmel Science club and LASAC. Videos provide a look at the campus and activities.

Troop No 501, NCC Army wing, was started in 1999 by Carmel's headmaster A. Maria Sigamony. A troop of 100 cadets was initiated by M. Arul Rajan as the caretaker. Cadets participate in the Republic Day March Past at Rajpath, New Delhi, and attend a variety of camps. Several have received scholarships.

== See also ==
- List of Jesuit schools
- List of schools in Tamil Nadu
