= Ida S. Scudder =

American missionary to India (1870–1960)

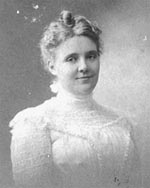
Scudder in 1899

Ida Sophia Scudder (December 9, 1870 – May 24, 1960) was a third-generation American medical missionary in India. She sought to improve the plight of Indian women by fighting against bubonic plague, cholera and leprosy. In 1918, she started a teaching hospital, the Christian Medical College & Hospital, in Vellore, India.

== Early life ==
Ida was born to John Scudder and Sophia (née Weld), in a line of medical missionaries that started with her grandfather, John Scudder Sr. They were members of the Reformed Church in America. Growing up as a child in India, Ida witnessed famine, poverty and disease. She was invited by Dwight Moody to study at his Northfield Seminary in Massachusetts, where she earned a reputation for pranks. In 1890, she returned to India to help her father when her mother was ailing at the mission bungalow at Tindivanam in the Madras Province. During her stay, she witnessed three women die in childbirth in one night and resolved to go into medicine.

Scudder graduated from Cornell Medical College, New York City, in 1899, a member of the first class that accepted women as medical students. She then headed back to India and started a tiny medical dispensary and clinic for women at Vellore, 75 miles from Madras. Her father died in 1900, soon after she arrived in India. In two years, she treated 5,000 patients.

== Christian Medical College, Vellore ==
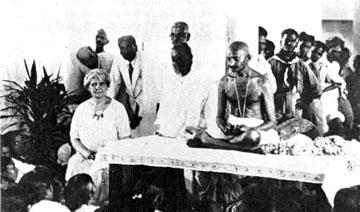
Scudder with Mahatma Gandhi, 1928

Scudder opened the Mary Taber Schell Hospital in 1902. She decided to open a girls-only medical school and received 151 applications the first year (1918) and had to turn many away subsequently.

In 1928, ground was broken for the "Hillsite" medical school campus on 200 acres (0.8 km^{2}) at Bagayam, Vellore. In 1928, Mahatma Gandhi visited the medical school. Scudder traveled a number of times to the United States to raise funds for the college and hospital. In 1945, the college was opened to men as well as women. In 2003 the Vellore Christian Medical Center was the largest Christian hospital in the world, with 2000 beds, and its medical school is now one of the premier medical colleges in India. In 2023, the center was ranked the number three college by the National Institute Ranking Framework (NIRF).

The Center was later headed by Scudder's niece, Ida Belle Scudder, and fellow medical missionary Paul Brand worked there for a time.

== Last years ==
In 1952, Scudder received the Elizabeth Blackwell Citation from the New York Eye and Ear Infirmary, as one of 1952's five outstanding women doctors.

She died on May 24, 1960, at her bungalow.

In 1960, Rajendra Prasad, then President of India, hailed Scudder as a “great lady, whose dedication and planned working are exemplary”.

== Legacy ==
- The Ida Scudder School in Viruthampet, Vellore, is named in her honour
- On January 9, 2020, the American Heritage Girls announced that she would be included as a Level Award namesake, replacing Lewis and Clark as the Explorer Level Award namesake in their 2020 Handbook
- A commemorative stamp was released by the Department of Posts on August 12, 2000, as part of the centenary celebrations of the Christian Medical College. The First-day cover portrays Dr. Ida Scudder.

== Biographies ==
- Graves Dan (2005) Glimpses, issue #113, Christian History Institute, retrieved 9/8/2007 Ida Scudder, A Woman Who Changed Her Mind
- Legacy and Challenge: The Story of Dr. Ida B. Scudder, published by the Scudder Association
- Ida S. Scudder of Vellore: The Life Story of Ida Sophia Scudder by Dr. M. Pauline Jeffery, Wesley Press 1951
- With: Ida S. Scudder and her gleam: memorial supplement, 1960–1961, by M. Pauline Jeffery. Vellore: Christian Medical College of Vellore, 1961
- Dr. Ida by Dorothy Clarke Wilson 1959
- The Doctor Who Never Gave Up by Carolyn Scott 1975
- A Thousand Years In Thy Sight by Dorothy Jealous Scudder (1984) Chapters 25-27
- Ida Scudder: Healing Bodies Touching Hearts by Janet Benge and Geoff Benge 2003
- Dr. Ida Skudder by Veena Gavhankar, Raj Hans Prakashan, 1983 Marathi.

== Other sources ==
- From Mission to Church: The Reformed Church in America Mission to India By Eugene P. Heideman, Published by Wm. B. Eerdmans Publishing, 2001, ISBN 0-8028-4900-8, ISBN 978-0-8028-4900-7, 512 pages.
