= RMK Engineering College =

Educational institution in Tamil Nadu, India

R.M.K. Engineering College
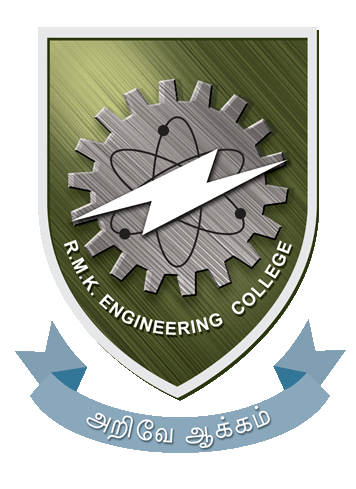
- Motto: அறிவே ஆக்கம்
- Motto in English: Knowledge is Wealth
- Type: Private
- Established: 1995
- Affiliations: Anna University, Chennai
- Budget: Rs 5,104.82 Lakhs (2019-2020)
- Chairman: Thiru R.S. Munirathinam
- Principal: Dr. K.A.Mohammed Junaid
- Dean: Prof. K.Chandrasekaran
- Faculty: ~300
- Students: ~3,650
- Undergraduates: ~3,500
- Postgraduates: ~150
- Location: Chennai, Tamil Nadu, 601206, India; 13°21′23.9″N 80°08′28.0″E
- Campus: Sub Urban, 60 acres
- Language: English
- Approvals: AICTE, NBA
- Website: http://www.rmkec.ac.in

R.M.K. Engineering College (RMKEC) is a private engineering college at Kavaraipettai, Gummidipoondi Taluk, Tamil Nadu, India, governed by the Lakshmikanthammal Educational Trust. It is affiliated to Anna University, Chennai, and accredited by All India Council for Technical Education(AICTE) with A+ Grade (3.52/4.00). All the seven departments of the college are accredited by the National Board of Accreditation(NBA). It is a minority institution under language category. The college got autonomous status for a period of 10 years from the session 2020–2021 to 2029–2030

== History ==
Opened in 1995 with three departments -- Electrical and Electronics Engineering, Computer Science and Engineering, Electronics and Communication Engineering, and Mechanical Engineering, the college is located in Kavaraipettai - a town in Gummidipoondi Taluk of Thiruvallur district. In addition to offering Bachelor's and master's degrees in most of the engineering departments, the college also offers a master's degree in Computer Applications (MCA) and Business Administration (MBA). The campus is spread across 60 acres. The college has a fleet of 80 buses for transportation of students. The number of students per class is 40 till second year to maintain a healthy Student to Faculty ratio. From the second year onwards the students per class is 60.

== Courses Offered ==
Bachelor's Degree

1. B.E. in Civil Engineering
2. B.E. in Computer Science and Engineering
3. B.E. in Electrical and Electronics Engineering
4. B.E. in Electronics and Communication Engineering
5. B.E. in Electronics and Instrumentation Engineering
6. B.Tech. in Information Technology
7. B.E. in Mechanical Engineering.
8. B.Tech. in Artificial Intelligence and Data Science .

== Awards and recognitions ==
- The college is certified by DNV Netherlands as ISO 9001:2008 compliant.
- The college has been awarded "Bharatiya Vidya Bhavan National Award for an Engineering College having Best Overall Performance" by the Indian Society for Technical Education (ISTE) for 2008.

== Rankings ==
University and college rankings

Engineering – India
- NIRF (2023): 151-200

The National Institutional Ranking Framework (NIRF) ranked it in the 151-200 band among engineering colleges in 2023.
