= Good Shepherd International School, Ooty =

International residential school in M. palada, Ooty

Good Shepherd International School
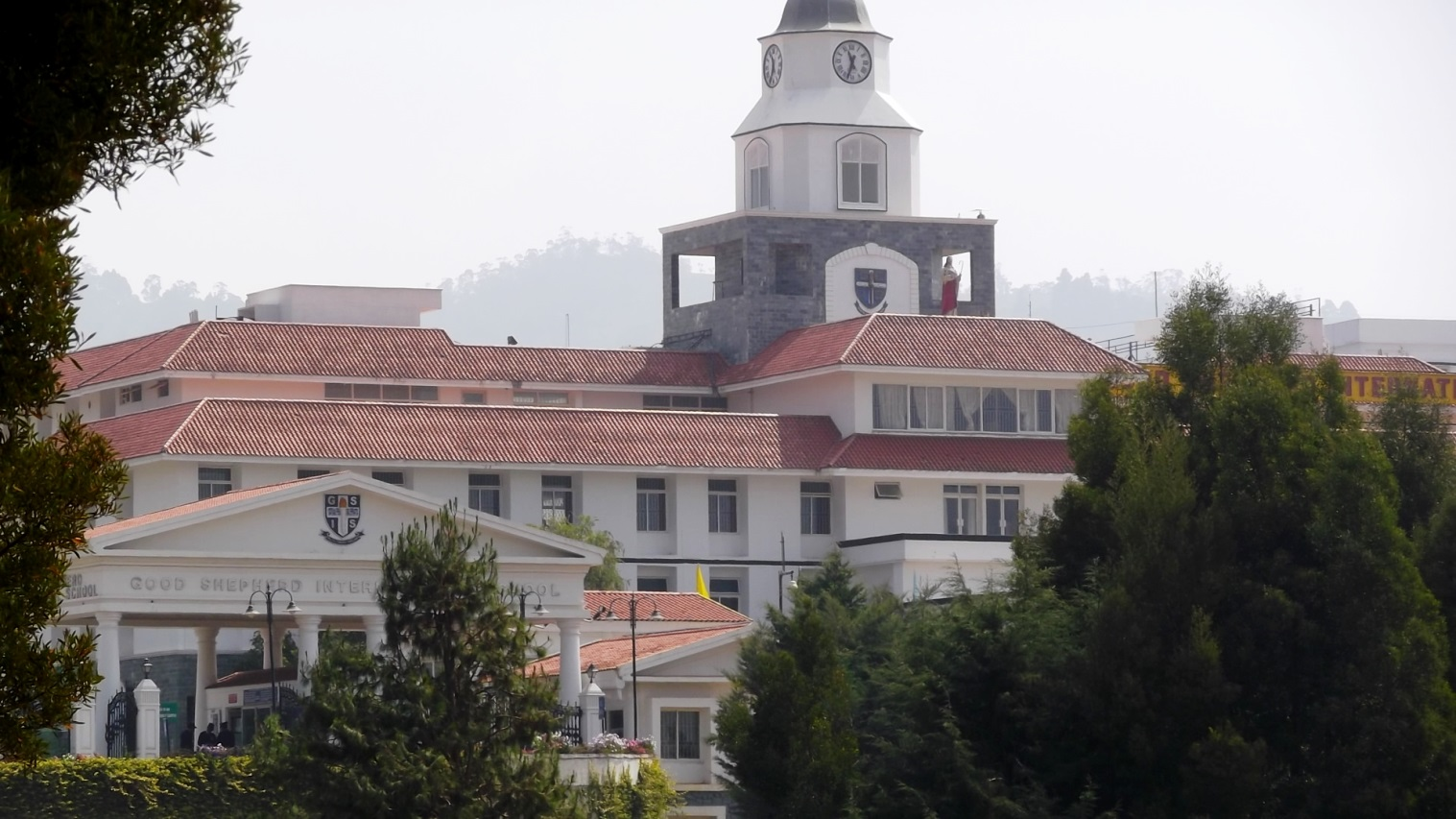

Location
- M. Palada P.O. Niligris district Ooty, Tamil Nadu; India

Information
- Type: Private, fully residential school
- Motto: Truth, Trust, Triumph
- Founded: February 1977
- Founder: P.C. Thomas
- President: Jacob Thomas
- Principal: Vinod Singh
- Enrollment: 655
- Website: www.gsis.ac.in

Good Shepherd International School is an international residential school founded in 1977, located at Ootacamund (Ooty), in Nilgiris, Tamil Nadu, India.

== See also ==
- St. Joseph's Higher Secondary School, Ooty
- Breeks Memorial School, Ooty
- Hebron School, Ooty
- Lawrence School, Lovedale, Ooty
- Stanes Hr.Sec. School, Coonoor
