= Ramanputhoor =

- Town
- Location in Tamil Nadu, India
- Coordinates: 8°10′13″N 77°25′32″E
- Country: India
- State: Tamil Nadu
- District: Kanyakumari

Languages
  - Official: Tamil
- Time zone: UTC+5:30 (IST)
- PIN: 629004
- Telephone code: 04652
- Vehicle registration: TN-74
- Lok Sabha constituency: Nagercoil
- Vidhan Sabha constituency: Nagercoil

Ramanputhoor is a town in Kanyakumari, a district of the Indian state of Tamil Nadu.

== Educational institutions ==
There are many schools in the area, such as Carmel Higher Secondary School and the Little Flower Girls Higher Secondary School. Ramanputhoor is located around 1.5 kilometres (0.93 mi) from Nagercoil, the district capital. There is a famous Catholic church, Holy Family Church, which is the second largest parish in the Roman Catholic diocese of Kottar and the third-largest in revenue.

== History ==
The majority of Ramanputhoor residents are Catholic. Elders of the area believe that this Hindu place was converted to Christianity when St.Francis Xavier visited Ramanputhoor in the 16th century.

== Economy ==
Ramanputhoor is well known for construction workers, who used to gather here in the morning before proceeding with the day's work. Other important buildings include Rita's Convent, an institution run by nuns where working women are provided boarding. There are several nursing homes in the area, the result of several locals who studied medicine from the 1970s onwards. Kalveedu, built of stones and concrete, is the first house built in this area.

== Notable persons ==
Well-known people associated with Ramanputhoor include engineer and humanitarian Ln. Er. I. Nicholas, who designed & developed important agricultural processing machinery; Dr. Mariya Johnson Thirupapu, who received the first Grand Award for native doctor from the President of India; Dr. Dorothy, a paediatrician at Brooklyn Hospital in New York City; Mervin Alexander, the Postmaster General of Chennai; and, Dr. Henry Louis, an agricultural scientist credited with co-creating the hybrid variety of coconut palm.

The new generation of people from Ramanputhoor are leaders in fields and have made their mark in IC Design, AI and emerging fields. Women engineers have made many contributions. Dr. Eustace Painkras an IC Design Engineer, developed SpiNNaker, a power-efficient chip multiprocessor which forms the building blocks for the new generation of Supercomputers.

== See also ==
- Mela Raman Puthoor
- Kela Raman Puthoor
