= Parvez Dewan =

Indian Administrative Services officer

- Born: Srinagar, Jammu and Kashmir, India
- Education: St. Stephen's College, University of Cambridge
- Occupations: Writer and civil servant
- Writing career
- Language: English, Hindi, Urdu
- Genre: Historical

Parvez Dewan is a former Indian administrator, author and librettist (lyricist). He was an Indian Administrative Services (IAS) officer of Jammu and Kashmir cadre. He became Secretary of the Ministry of Overseas Indian Affairs in 2011, and also the chairman of the Overseas Indian Facilitation Centre (OIFC). In 2012 he was appointed India's Tourism Secretary.

Dewan has authored books on Jammu & Kashmir, religion (Hinduism, Islam, Buddhism) as well as on Tibet.

== Early life ==
Parvez Dewan was born in Srinagar. His father was a Wing Commander who began his career in the Royal Indian Air Force and grandfather an Army Brigadier, who later became the first Indian Inspector General of Police of Jammu and Kashmir.

Dewan was educated at St Joseph's, Allahabad; St. George's Grammar, Hyderabad; Stanes, Coimbatore; The Air Force Central School, Subroto Park, New Delhi and St. Stephen's College in Delhi. He was elected President of St. Stephen's College. He received his higher education at Wolfson College, University of Cambridge. Dewan was the Senior Treasurer of the CU (Cambridge University) Friends of the Earth; and active with the CU Greens and CU Mystical Society.

Dewan was later elected a visiting research fellow of Queen Elizabeth House at the University of Oxford. At Cambridge, he won the Jennings Prize for obtaining the highest marks, as well as a distinction, in the Development Studies class. At St. Stephen's he was awarded the L. Raghubir Singh History prize for ranking first in his class.

== Career ==
=== Civil services ===
Dewan joined the IAS and was allotted the Jammu and Kashmir cadre.

During his first posting as Sub-Divisional Magistrate in Basohli, he revived its school of miniature painting.

Dewan was the Divisional commissioner of Kashmir from 2001 to 2003. and also chairman of the state co-operative bank between 2002 – 2003. Dewan was also the resident commissioner of Jammu & Kashmir before he took charge as the chairman and managing director of India Tourism Development Corporation in 2006. The company recorded its three highest-ever profits under him, and declared the only three dividends that it has since 1997.

Dewan was the Tourism Secretary of India (2012–14). He helped WoNoBo.com devise virtual walking tours of Indian cities, five in the first place, with almost fifty more to follow, making Incredible India the first national tourism authority anywhere to offer such a useful and entertaining facility.

Advisor (minister)

In 2016 Dewan was appointed Jammu and Kashmir's Advisor (i.e. cabinet minister) for twelve departments including Education, Tourism, Public Works, Culture, Health & Medical Education, Consumer Affairs, Information Technology, Youth Services and Sports. (In India ministers are elected politicians. However, sometimes when state governments are between elected governments they appoint career civil servants as ministers and call them Advisors to the Governor.)

=== Writer ===
Dewan translated the Hanuman Chalisa into English, written The Names of Allah, and brought out Jesus Christ Superstar in Urdu. He has also converted Habba Khatun's songs into Urdu songs, set to the same tune.

Dewan is also the co-author of Tibet: fifty years after with Siddharth Shrivastava. Dalai Lama has written the foreword to this book. In the foreword, HE the Dalai lama advocates peace for Tibet and China, and states that violence is counter-productive and creates misery. Dewan and Shrivastava visited Tibet after the 2008 failed uprising of Tibetans against the Chinese rule, & documented the population figures and the socio-political situation in the region.

Dewan has researched into various caste and religious groups in India. He has focused on the biased projections that the media has created for minority religious and ethnic groups within the country—and tried to compare them with similar prejudices against internal ethnic groups in Pakistan (Punjabi and Urdu cinema; textbooks), the USA (including US cinema and TV), the UK, Turkey, Indonesia, Europe (French cinema; permission to wear religion-appropriate clothing) and Africa.

== Books ==
Dewan has published twenty books till date, some of which are listed in the table below

S.No.	Year	Title	Publisher	ISBN
01	1987	Hiñdî-Urdû Phrasebook: A language Survival Kit	Lonely Planet, Australia	
02	1989	The Civil Services: What they are all about and how to get in	20/ 20 Publications, Delhi	
03	2001	The Hanûmân Châlîsâ	Viking Penguin	
04	2003	The Names of Allah	Viking Penguin	ISBN 9780670049561
05	2004	Parvez Dewan's Jammu.Kashmir.Ladakh: Kashmir	Manas Publications	ISBN 9788170491798
06	2004	Parvez Dewan's Jammu.Kashmir.Ladakh: Ladakh	Manas Publications	
07	2004	The Book of Hanuman	Viking Penguin Books	ISBN 9780143067597
08	2004	Allâh ké Muqaddas Naam (trans. Ather)	Qaumi Council Bara-e Farogh-e-Urdu Zuban	
09	2007	Parvez Dewan's Jammu.Kashmir.Ladakh: Jammu	Manas Publications	
10	2008	A history of Ladakh	Manas Publications	ISBN 9788170493143
11	2008	A history of Kashmir	Manas Publications	ISBN 9788170493389
12	2008	A history of Jammu	Manas Publications	
13	2009	Tibet: fifty years after	Shubhi Publications	ISBN 9788182901315
14	2010	Hanuman ji, His Vanars and His Lanka	Shubhi Publications	
15	2011	The people and culture of Jammu, Kashmir Ladakh	Manas Publications	
16	2011	The Other Kashmir	Manas Publications	ISBN 9788170493709
17	2012	Jammu Kashmir Ladakh: Natural Heritage	Manas Publications	
18	2012	Amazing Ladakh	Manas Publications	
19	2013	Amazing Kashmir	Manas Publications	
20	2013	Religion in Jammu Kashmir Ladakh	Manas Publications	

== Journalism ==
As a college student Dewan was for three years the Campus Correspondent of The Hindustan Times Evening News. During the same period, for Youth Times [a Times of India publication] he reviewed music (mainly Western popular and classical) and did the Hodge Podge column under the pseudonym Ponga Muni.

Indian Express wrote about Dewan:

Parvez Dewan seems to have that rare quality to poke fun at himself. On the author’s profile page of his latest book on Kashmir, this J&K IAS officer has candidly revealed some interesting facts about himself.

“Most of the publications that Parvez has written for have folded up (Youth Times, JS, The Hindustan Times Evening News, The Metropolitan on Saturday, Shama (Urdu) and such sections of The Times of India as he regularly contributed to)”, it mentions. “The venerable Illustrated Weekly of India wrote a long story about how Parvez created the Ladakh Festival in difficult circumstances. That was its last issue,”

it carries on.

At another point, it talks about two of his ‘libretti’ having been recorded as rock operas in Denmark, and a third telecast on Britain’s Channel Four, adding: "And none of the three was ever heard of again."

A fourth pop-opera, Sanober and the Slave has had somewhat better luck. In 2012 it spent more than three months at no. 1 on reverbnation.com's DK charts for Indie (Independent), thanks to the much acclaimed music of Kim Barner, his Danish partner in rhyme. The complete lyrics/ libretto/ book can be read at https://sanoberandtheslave.blogspot.com/; the complete musical with music and vocals can be heard at reverbnation.com/barner

== Libretti/ lyrics ==
Dewan has written some libretti. The status of the pop-operas of which he has written the libretti (lyrics) and which were conceived by him is.

S.No.	Year	Title	Music by	Status
01	1994	Jennifer Merchant	Kim Barner and Neils Holde (both of Denmark)	Romantic comedy, recorded on CD with Koda, Denmark
02	1984	Moscow Streets Are Wet	Not recorded	A paean to Moscow as it then was
03	1989	The Râmâyan (English)	John Robertson (ex- of The Rubettes, a once famous British Top Ten act)	Performed on Channel 4, UK
04	1989	The Râmâyan (Hindi-Urdu)		Not recorded
05	1987	The Mahâbhârat (English)	John Robertson, ex-of the Rubettes	Not recorded
06	1987	The Mahâbhârat (Hindi-Urdu)		Not recorded
07	1987	Narasimh (English only)	John Robertson	Not recorded
08	1987	Atharv	Not recorded	Hindi-Urdu version of Verdi's Otello
09	1995	Pawns	Not recorded	A tribute to the six European and American tourists taken hostage by the Pakistan-based 'Al Faran.'
10	1993	Jesus Christ Superstar	Reverent Hindi-Urdu lyrics set to Andrew Lloyd Webber's music	Not recorded
11	1987	The Odyssey	Kim Barner and Neils Holde	Rock opera version of the Homer classic; performed in Amsterdam
12	1996	Sanober and the Slave	Kim Barner	a fairy—in the old sense—tale
13	2005	Paar sarhad sey aaya hai yaar	Parvez Dewan	(Urdu; an album-length song about two hitherto, but not necessarily, doomed lovers—Dewan's motherland and its western neighbour) Performed at WISCOMP's Indo-Pak workshops in 2005 (with music) and 2012 (recited)
14	1998	Dastan e Habba	Original Kashmiri lyrics and music by Habba Khatoon	Five songs by Habba Khatoon rendered into Urdu and performed at Lady Sri Ram College, Delhi
