= Harry Blyth =

English writer

- Born: 1852; Woolwich, London, England
- Died: 9 February 1898 (aged 45–46)
- Occupations: Writer, editor, journalist
- Writing career
- Pen name: Hal Meredith
- Period: 1876–1898
- Genres: Detective fiction, adventure fiction

Henry Thomas (Harry) Blyth (January 1852 – February 1898) was a British journalist, novelist, playwright, and editor, best remembered as the creator of the fictional detective Sexton Blake. A prolific contributor to newspapers, Victorian penny papers and Alfred Harmsworth's early boys' periodicals, Blyth's fast-paced, melodramatic tales were quite popular in late 19th-century Britain and were also republished in newspapers in Australia.

== Early life and education ==
Harry Blyth was born aboard HMS Unite, a hulk ship off Woolwich, in January 1852. His father was a naval surgeon who died a few months after Harry's birth, leaving behind a widow and three children. His siblings were Ellen Julia Anne (Julia) Blyth (who married Dr. John Shortt and died in India in her early twenties) and Alexander Wynter Blyth, who became a medical officer of health for North Devon. Originally intended for the medical profession like his father and brother, Blyth showed an early aversion to medicine. In 1867, he was placed in a shipping agent's office in London, where he worked until 1869. Growing tired of desk work, he briefly joined George Ellerton's Dramatic Company at Maidstone, performing various characters for three months before abandoning the stage. In 1870, Blyth passed the preliminary examination at Durham University required for medical school entry.

== Writing career ==
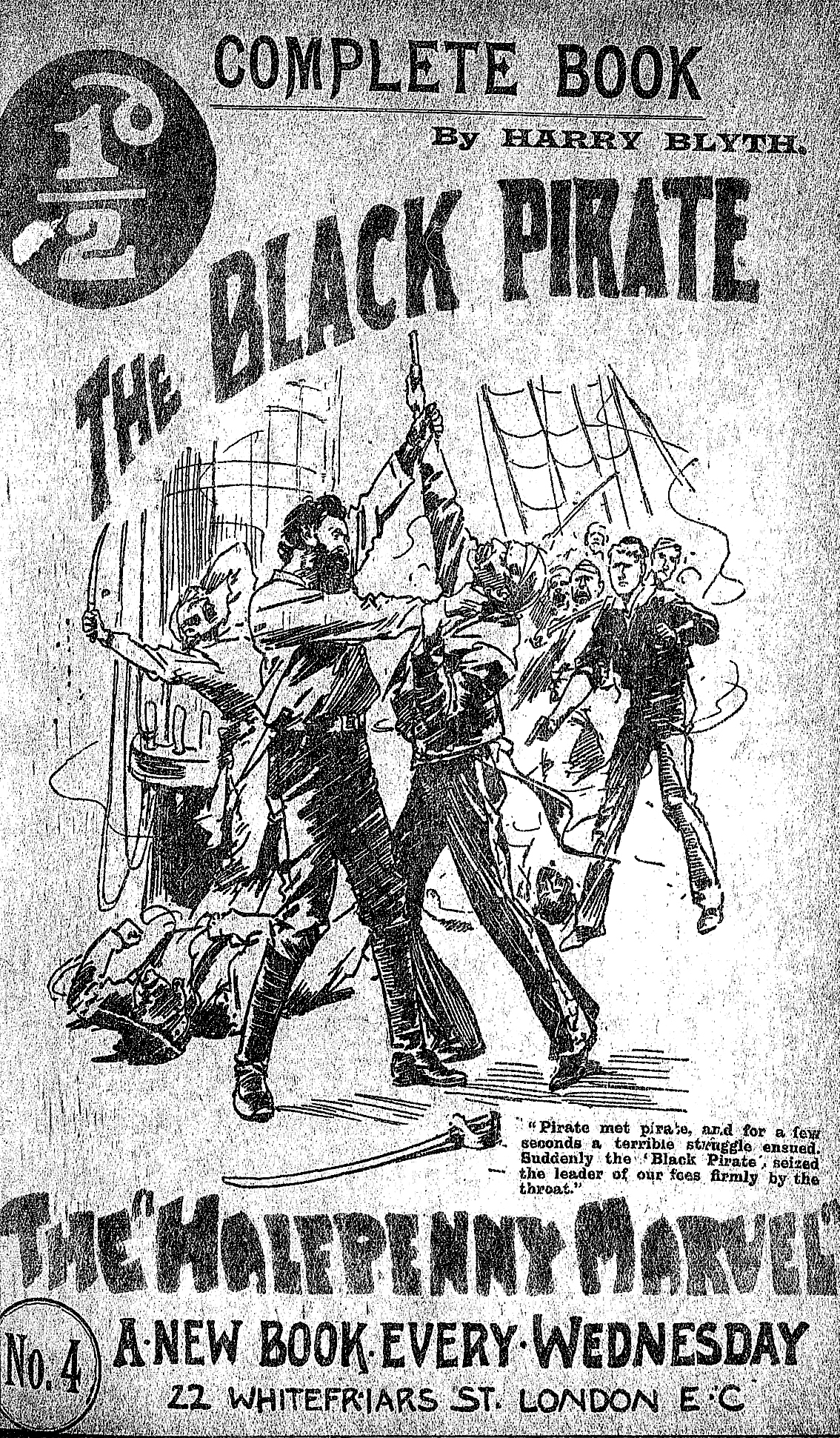
Cover of the Black Pirate, 1893

While reading for his examination at Durham University, Blyth wrote his first published story, A London Engagement, a tale in imitation of Edgar Allan Poe. He contributed to a London periodical called The Million; and wrote regularly for the Irish comic paper, Blarney. He entered medical school in London in October 1871 and excelled in subjects such as chemistry and physiology, but his growing passion for writing soon eclipsed his medical ambitions. He began to skip lectures in favour of writing articles for various periodicals.

His brother Alexander Wynter Blyth, the medical officer for North Devon, invited him to North Devon to assist in the writing of A Dictionary of Hygiene and Public Health (published by Charles Griffin & Co., 1876), a respected reference work in which Blyth, though uncredited, authored most of the food-related articles. During this time, he also wrote the popular article series Freaks of the Palate, which was well received and widely circulated.

His success continued with Eat, Drink and be Merry (1876), a collection of culinary essays that appeared in multiple newspapers. Eat, Drink and be Merry; or Dainty Bits from many Tables was published by J. A. Brook and Co in 1876, reportedly selling around 60,000 copies. Nearly 200 newspapers gave the work favourable reviews. Of it, the Bookseller wrote: "This is not a Cookery book, but a gossip about all sorts of Cookery, from real turtle to snails; all sorts of drinks, from Champagne to small beer eau-de-voie to nettle tea; with anecdotes culled from all sources, and presented with the sauce of a true literary caterer."

Blyth followed this with a series titled Crooked London, a portrait of town life, and eventually accepted a post as sub-editor, and occasionally editor, of The National Food and Fuel Reformer, further drawing him away from medical studies.

By 1877, Blyth had made a definitive break from medicine. That year, he wrote Snacks for the Hungry for The Tatler, edited by R.E. Francillon. The 24-article series on food and dining was a popular and critical success, convincing Blyth to abandon his medical studies once and for all and make his living as a writer.

After his articles in the Tatler, he began writing serials for the leading provincial papers, each production appearing simultaneously in a number of journals. Some of the serials from the late 1870s include: The Queen of the Air, a theatrical story: A Wily Woman, a tale that deals with spiritualism; Silverflake, a short story; and the Bloom of the Heather.

In 1879 he wrote another book on gastronomic lore Magic Morsels: Scraps from an Epicure's Table, Gathered, Garnished and Dished by Harry Blyth, published by T.H. Roberts and Co of London. That same year, Mr Blyth's life story was told in an early number of the Biograph, a monthly magazine devoted to contemporary biography.

Harry Blyth’s venture into periodical publishing began with The Archer, an illustrated weekly he launched in Edinburgh in 1880. It folded after the first issue. Of the experience he wrote: "I printed it on green paper partly because of the title, but mainly to give the eyes of my readers a rest. They rested so well that they never saw the type, and were too sleepy to want the second number. This, I believe, was the first attempt made in Great Britain to give newspaper readers absolute repose."

A more enduring success followed with The Chiel, co-founded in Glasgow alongside Robert Arthur, the builder of the Kennington Theatre. A Scottish Punch-style paper it ran for 363 issues from 17 February 1883, to 25 January 1890.

In 1884 he was editor of Cream o' the North, a paper published by the Savoy Publishing company.

In 1887 Blyth founded the North British Publishing Company and published The Secret of Sinclair's Farm a popular serial of his that had run in several newspapers and had been well-received.

The following year he published The Queen of the Air also to very positive reviews. A reviewer in Fun wrote "This is one of the thrilling romances by a deservedly popular author, now in course of publication, and is worthy of wide circulation."

In 1889 he became editor of Waverly, a literary, dramatic and fictional paper where he also wrote a column entitled "The New Mysteries of London, or The Old Bailey" where he 'cleared up many mysteries.' In 1890 he edited a new weekly paper called Romance He also had an interest in the theatre and wrote a very successful pantomime for the Theatre Royal, Glasgow.

In 1893, after writing a series of thirteen articles entitled Third Class Crimes for The Sunday People, he came to the attention of publisher Alfred Harmsworth who was looking for writers to contribute to his newly launched boys' periodicals. The story goes that when publisher and author met for the first time, Harmsworth greeted Blyth by saying: "So you are the crime merchant?", to which Blyth replied: "Just as you are the newspaper merchant." Harmsworth who was always impressed by people who stood up to him, commissioned him to write adventure and detective stories for The Halfpenny Marvel.

Blyth made his debut in The Halfpenny Marvel No. 2 with The Gold Fiend under the pen-name Hal Meredeth. It was followed by a tale under his own name, The Black Pirate, in issue No. 4, a swashbuckler that may have been the inspiration for the movie starring Douglas Fairbanks of the same name a few decades later.

He created Sexton Blake in The Missing Millionaire which ran in issue No. 6. The sequel A Christmas Crime ran in issue No. 7, both to popular success. Blyth published these tales under the name Hal Meredth, the surname being his mother's maiden name. He wrote prolifically for the Amalgamated Press papers over the next four years, under his pen-name and his own name, in Pluck, Popular, Chums and the Union Jack.

== The libel case of 1888 ==
Blyth was known for his humour and it got him into trouble once. As reported in the Glasgow Herald, 20 April 1888.

Action for Alleged Libel

In the Court of Queen's Bench, London, yesterday, Mr Justice Hawkins and a special jury were engaged in hearing the case Marks v. Blyth. The plaintiff claimed damages for a libel published by the defendant, who pleaded that he had made an apology and paid £10 into Court to satisfy Mr. Marks's demand. Mr Kisch was the counsel representing the plaintiff, whilst Mr. Kergp, Q.C., Mr. Horace Browne, and Mr Lynn appeared for the defendant.

The plaintiff, it appears, is a journalist, and has done work for the Times, the Morning Post, and other journals both in this country and abroad. In October of last year a publication was about to appear called the Society Herald, which was to be devoted to financial, theatrical, literary, and other matters. Of that journal Mr. Marks was the editor-elect. The defendant, Mr. Harry Blyth, is the editor and proprietor of a weekly serio-comic paper called the Chiel, which circulates in and about Glasgow, and in this publication he published on 22 October the paragraph complained of. It ran thus:—"London is threatened with a new society journal, which is to be called the Society Herald. The editor is said to be used to cakumpicking, and the staff, I am told, consists of criminal lawyers and pugilists." The attention of the defendant was called to the statements contained in the libel, all of which Mr. Marks denied, and on 10 December—six weeks after the publication—an apology was inserted. The question was whether the £10 paid into Court, coupled with the apology, was sufficient compensation. Mr Blyth, the plaintiff, was called in support of his case. No other evidence was called.

Mr. Kemp addressed the jury for the defence, Mr. Blyth was, he said, absolutely unacquainted with the identity of the plaintiíf and his staff. The paragraph in question was a stupid joke, for which a humble apology had been offered. Taking the circumstances into consideration, he submitted that the £10 paid in was enough.

Mr. Kisch, replying, contended that the statements made constituted about as serious and scandalous and unjustifiable a libel as could be published. He asked for substantial damages.

Mr. Justice Hawkins having summed up, the jury retired to consider their verdict. They returned into Court after a short absence, when the foreman said that they found for the plaintiff for £10 paid into Court.

Mr. HORACE BROWNE—Upon that finding I ask your lordship to enter judgment for the defendant, and to certify for a special jury. The claim was for £1000.

Mr. Justice HAWKINS—I will reserve my judgement. In the meantime, I will ask the jury some further questions. (To the jury)—Are you of opinion that the libel was inserted without malice or gross negligence?

The FOREMAN—Yes.

Mr. Justice HAWKINS—Did the defendant insert the apology at the earliest opportunity?—No.

Mr. Justice HAWKINS—Do you consider the apology a full one?—Yes.

Mr. Justice HAWKINS—You find that the sum paid into Court is enough to satisfy the claim?—Yes.

Mr. Justice HAWKINS—Don't let the ten pounds dwell in your minds at all. Just ask yourselves this question—Having regard to all the circumstances, if no money had been paid in, what would you say would be the right amount of damages to award the plaintiff ?—None at all. (Laughter.)

Mr. Justice HAWKINS—That puts a different complexion upon the matter.

Mr. KISCH—Is that the unanimous verdict of the jury?

A JUROR—No.

Mr. Justice HAWKINS—What is your unanimous verdict?

A JUROR—How small a sum can we give?

Mr. Justice HAWKINS—Well, gentlemen, I can amend the record and make the claim for a million instead of a thousand, and then you can give any sum between a farthing and a million inclusive. (Laughter.)

Eventually the jury assessed the damages at one farthing.

Mr. Justice HAWKINS—You find that the plaintiff, if he cannot get the £10, is to have a farthing?

The FOREMAN—Yes.

Mr. KISCH—I apply for judgement.

Mr. Justice HAWKINS—I enter judgment for you for the damages which the jury have found namely, a farthing.

Mr. BROWNE asked his Lordship—Supposing the verdict for a farthing was an ultimate one to deprive the plaintiff of his costs?

Mr Kisch protested.

Mr Justice HAWKINS—You consider it a Scotch joke. (Laughter.) Whether the plaintiff is entitled to any or what costs will be decided at the proper time.

Judgement entered for the plaintiff—damages a farthing.

== Sexton Blake ==
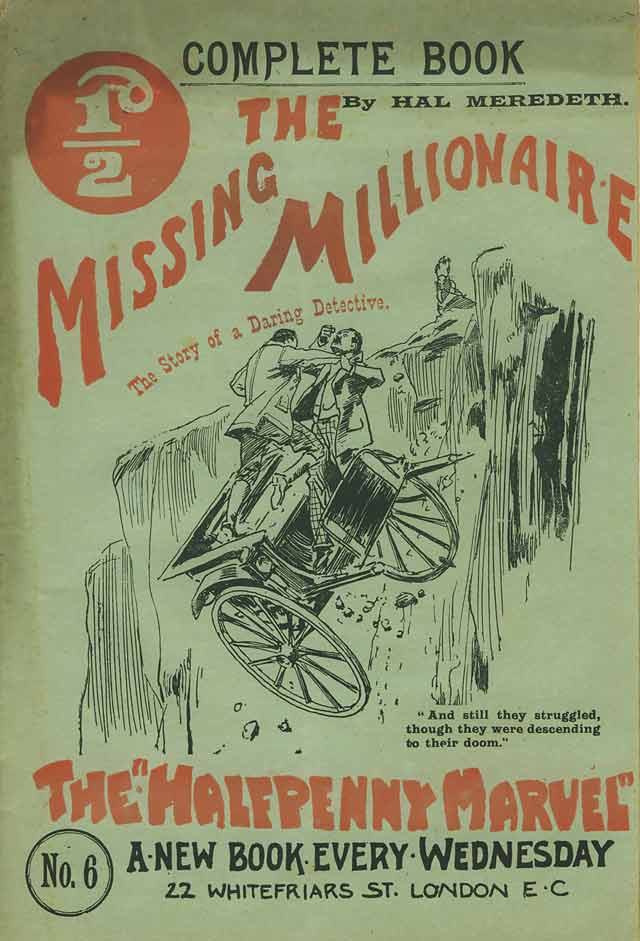
Cover of the first Sexton Blake tale

Harry Blyth was paid £9.9 for the full rights to the first Sexton Blake story, the name, and the character. He wrote seven Blake stories in total.

- The Halfpenny Marvel #6: "The Missing Millionaire" as Hal Meredeth
- The Halfpenny Marvel #7: "A Christmas Crime" as Hal Meredeth
- The Halfpenny Marvel #11: "A Golden Ghost; or, Tracked by a Phantom" as Harry Blyth
- The Halfpenny Marvel #33: "Sexton Blake's Peril!" as Hal Meredeth
- The Union Jack 1st Series #2: "Sexton Blake; Detective" as Harry Blyth
- The Union Jack 1st Series #15: "Sexton Blake's Triumph!" as Hal Meredith
- The Union Jack 1st Series #194: "'Twixt Gallows and Gold" as Anon

Blyth had originally given Blake a partner, French detective Jules Gervaise, his senior and mentor. Gervaise disappeared after the first few stories and starred in his own solo tale The Accusing Shadow in 1894. Perhaps noting the success of Sexton Blake, Blyth created his own detective, Gideon Barr, to whom he retained the rights. Barr's career, however, was short-lived, comprising just five tales. He made his last appearance in Christmas Clues, the first Sexton Blake/Nelson Lee crossover, a story he co-wrote with Maxwell Scott.

Blyth's Blake stories, though they included traditional crimes like theft and murder, also had the detective engage with master criminals, gangs and conspiracies. Blake faced "The Red Lights of London" in The Missing Miliionaire "The Slaughterer" in Sexton Blake's Triumph, "The Terrible Three" in Sexton Blake's Peril and "the Zeefri" in The Golden Ghost.

== Personal life and death ==
Blyth married Emma Read in 1874, and the couple had one son, also named Harry. He maintained a lifelong interest in the theatre and organized amateur dramatic societies, particularly during his time in Barnstaple.

He died of typhoid fever in February, 1898, aged only 46, in Peckham Rye, London. His passing was widely reported. His obituary in the North Devon Journal (Barnstaple, England) on 10 February read:

The death is announced of Mr. Harry Blyth, editor of The Chiel, Glasgow. Deceased was the younger brother of Dr. Wynter Blyth, the famous analyst, who some years ago resided at Barnstaple, and was then the Medical officer of Health for a group of North Devon Unions. Deceased had a great liking for amateur theatricals, and during his residence in Barnstaple often appeared on the boards at the Barnstaple Theatre. He organised a local histrionic club, which lasted until he himself left the town. After he left Barnstaple he took to journalism in many of its varied forms, being especially clever and witty in his humorous productions. He was also considered an authority on food, and among the books written by him are "Magic Morsels, Scraps for the Hungry, and Eat, Drink, and be Merry.

=== Influence ===
Blyth’s fiction exemplifies the energetic, melodramatic style of the Victorian penny press. His narratives often explored crime, urban corruption, and hidden social tensions. He was a master of the serialized format, favoring swift plots, high emotion, and dramatic irony. Though less refined than the canonical Victorian novelists, Blyth’s work was immensely popular with the general public.

His work, though now mostly forgotten, had a largely hidden influence on later writers. The conspiracy scenes of The Accusing Shadow (1894) anticipate similar, later scenes in G.K. Chesterton's The Man Who Was Thursday, Agatha Christie's The Secret of Chimneys, and Dorothy L. Sayers' The Cave of Ali Baba. Run to Earth features Mrs. Pink, one of the earliest fictional female criminal masterminds. The ending of the story foreshadows Arthur Conan Doyle's ending in The Adventure of the Illustrious Client, written almost 30 years later.

== Selected bibliography ==
- Eat, Drink and be Merry; or Dainty Bits from Many Tables, 1876.
- Christmas Story of London Low Life, 1876
- Tinged with Blood, 1877
- Shattered, 1878
- The Bloom o' the Heather, 1878
- Snacks for the Hungry, The Tatler, 1879
- Magic Morsels: Scraps from an Epicure's table, 1879
- Silverflake, 1879
- Tom Tilsit, 1879
- When the Clock Stopped, 1879
- A Wily Woman, 1879
- As the Snow Fell, 1879
- Amongst Thieves or a Fatal valentine, 1879
- The Old Bailey. An Historical Romance, 1879
- Just a Queen, 1880
- Sweet Kate of Kinross!, 1880
- The Crimson Shadow, 1881
- Done in the Snow or Topsy Darling's Danger, 1881
- Paying His Way, 1882
- Twibell's Trip, A Holiday Story, 1882
- In the Nick of Time, 1882
- Clear as day, A Matter of Circumstantial Evidence, 1882
- To Her Heart's Content, 1882
- Heart for Heart, 1882
- Black Mail, 1883
- The Life of a Rogue, 1883
- A Tale of Sin and Sorrow
- The Love of a Life, 1883
- Snatched from Death
- Done in the Dark, 1883
- Harry Blyth's Christmas Annual, 1886
- A Comic History of Glasgow. By Bailie Islay, Junior. Illustrated, 1886
- A Narrow Squeak, 1887
- Like a Thief in the Night, 1887
- Helen Jegado, Maid-of-All Work, 1887
- The Secret of Sinclair's Farm, 1888
- The Handy Guide Book to the History, Antiquities, Buildings, Streets, and Surroundings of Dunfermline
- A Fearful Fortune, 1890
- My Sweetheart!: The Life and Adventures of Minnie Palmer
- A Christmas Fantasy, 1892
- Secrets of the London Squares
- Her Darling Foe, 1894

=== Secrets of the London Streets (1893) ===
1. Bowled Out in Bond Street
2. A Battersea Belle
3. Strange Story of a London Hotel
4. Bad Business at Bow
5. Buried Alive in Bermondsey
6. Dr. Herrick of Hinton Street
7. Like A Thief in the Night
8. A "Wicked Woman"
9. In the Nick of Time
10. Trapped in Whitechapel
11. Black Mail
12. Saved from Suicide
13. Helen Jegado: Maid-Of All-Work

=== Third Class Crimes (1893) ===
1. A Bermondsey Burglary
2. The Price of a Putney "Pub"
3. A Marriage Marred at Margate
4. High Play at Highbury
5. The Forged Bill and the Brighton Belle
6. A Cruel Trick at Teddington
7. The Biter Bit at Bayswater
8. Left Behind at Barnes
9. Love at Loughboroug Park
10. The Pale Woman at Peckham
11. A Man's Husband's Wife of Wimbledon
12. Called to Account at King's Cross
13. Trying it on at Tooting

=== The Old Bailey: Celebrated Trials Retold (1894) ===
- The Abergele Accident
- Illness of the Prince of Wales
- The Franco-Prussian War
- The Shah's Visit
- The Tichborne Trial
- The Loss of the Northfleet
- The Balham Mystery

=== The Halfpenny Marvel ===
- The Halfpenny Marvel #02 The Gold Fiend (as Hal Meredeth)
- The Halfpenny Marvel #04 The Black Pirate
- The Halfpenny Marvel #06 The Missing Millionaire (as Hal Meredeth)
- The Halfpenny Marvel #07 A Christmas Crime (as Hal Meredeth)
- The Halfpenny Marvel #23 Brought to Bay. A tale of lynch law (as Hal Meredeth)
- The Halfpenny Marvel #24 The Horrors of Siberia; or, Across the Roof of the World
- The Halfpenny Marvel #36 Silver Camp: A Story of Wild Life in California
- The Halfpenny Marvel #42 The Lone Islander
- The Halfpenny Marvel #48 The Accusing Shadow
- The Halfpenny Marvel #53 The Last of the Crew: Being the Adventures of the Sole Survivor of the Good Ship Tyne

=== The Union Jack ===
- The Union Jack 1st Series #2: Sexton Blake; Detective as Harry Blyth
- The Union Jack 1st Series #5: The White Slaver
- The Union Jack 1st Series #8: The Magic Island
- The Union Jack 1st Series #15: Sexton Blake's Triumph! as Hal Meredith
- The Union Jack 1st Series #16: The Bear Hunters
- The Union Jack 1st Series #22: The Hunt of the Walrus; or, King of the Frozen North
- The Union Jack 1st Series #194: 'Twixt Gallows and Gold as Anon

=== Pluck ===
- Pluck #02 Heroes of the Matabele War
- Pluck #05 Fighting the Fire or the Fireman's Secret
- Pluck #18 Brought to Justice or Gideon Barr's Secret
- Pluck #26 Hunted Down (Gideon Barr)
- Pluck #27 The Hero of Herat
- Pluck #33 The King of the Whalers
- Pluck #42 Run to Earth Or, Gideon Barr's Terrible Chase
- Pluck #46 Policeman Paul, the Hero of the Force
- Pluck #50 Diver Dick, or Under the Seas
- Pluck #56 Christmas Clues with Maxwell Scott
- Pluck No. 54 The King of the Steeplejacks
- Pluck No. 64 With Spear and Shell: A Story of the Zulu War
- Pluck #67 Policeman Paul
- Pluck #73 Jim Sandford The Signalman: A Hero of the Line
- Pluck #81 Mid Unseen Foes: The Story of Cecil Roman, King of the Ring
- Pluck #141 Brave Parley the Pilot

=== The Big Budget ===
Big Budget No. 1 From Toil to Triumph, 1897

=== In the Eye of the Law: Short Stories (1897) ===
- A Doctor's Downfall, 1897
- A Wolf Among the Flock, 1897
- A Gifted Slavey, 1897
- The Sin, the Sorrow, The Crime, 1897
- The Bottle, the Sovereign, and the Strange Man, 1897
- The Moneylender's Revenge, 1897
- Married to a Gorner, 1897
- A Perfect Lady, 1897
- A Rogue and His "Monkey", 1897
- Dr. Budd's Blunder, 1897
- The Terror of Her Life, 1897
- Old Rueben's Daughter, 1897
- My Body to the Hounds, 1897
- The Butler's Revenge, 1897
- A Cloud in the Sky, 1897
- Waiting for the Verdict, 1897
- The Transformation of Mr. Dunn 1897
- A Novelist's Eclipse, 1897
- Rescued from Durance, 1898

=== Chums ===
Chums #278–294 Hunji the Hindoo, 1898

=== Funny Wonder ===
- Strange Stories of Dark Deeds, Being Narratives of Actual Facts Collected from the Police Records of Europe
- The Terrible Three

=== Stage Play ===
Our Great Surprise, 1891 (A pantomime piece in one act)

=== New Collections ===
- The Secret of Sinclair's Farm, British Library, Historical Print Editions, 2011
- The Sexton Blake Casebook (1987) Includes The Missing Millionaire with original illustrations
- Victorian Tales of Mystery and Detection: An Oxford Anthology, 1992
- Vintage Mystery and Detective Stories, 1998. Includes The Accusing Shadow
- Sexton Blake: The Missing Millionaire a rewriting by Joseph Lovece. Includes original tale by Harry Blyth, 2015
- Sexton Blake: A Christmas Crime a rewriting by Joseph Lovece. Includes original tale by Harry Blyth, 2015
- Sexton Blake: The Early Years. ROH Press, 2020. Features the first 5 Sexton Blake cases
- Moriarty's Rivals: 13 Female Masterminds. ROH Press, 2020. Features Mrs. Pink in Run to Earth
