= Robert Stanes =

English businessman and philanthropist

Sir Robert Stanes
- Born: 13 May 1841; London, England
- Died: 6 September 1936 (aged 95); Coimbatore, Madras Province, British India
- Occupations: Founder, T Stanes & Company; industrialist; educationalist.
- Spouse: Harriet Huntingdon Harris

Sir Robert Stanes (13 May 1841 – 6 September 1936) was a British businessman and philanthropist in India who founded United Nilgiri Tea Estates (UNTE) in Coimbatore.

Stanes was born in Aldgate, London, the eighth of nine children of James Stanes (12 March 1796 – 3 February 1880) and Sarah Poultney Stanes (née Worth; 26 April 1806 – 15 July 1843). James Stanes was a glass and china shipping merchant who established the Stanes' presence in India by sending several of his sons to the country. In 1848, James Stanes junior (1830–1852), the second son, arrived in southern India and established the Runnymede Coffee Estate near Coonoor in Madras Presidency He was drowned in a swimming accident in May 1852 while travelling near Kulhutty. Later that year, following the death of James Stanes junior, William Henry Stanes (12 May 1826 – 31 January 1865), his eldest brother, was sent to India. He was followed by the fourth son, Thomas Stanes (6 January 1837 – 30 January 1905), who arrived at Madras on the SS Hindustan on 26 June 1855. James Stanes senior visited his sons William and Thomas in Madras Presidency in 1855, accompanied by his third son, Henry Thomas Stanes (1835–1917), who ran the London end of the family's businesses. The greatest impact in India was made by Robert Stanes, the youngest son, who arrived in India on 24 December 1858 on his father's ship the SS Trafalgar while still a boy of seventeen.

Robert immediately launched himself on a successful career as a coffee planter in Coimbatore. Five years later he established the first inland coffee-curing plant in India, In 1885, Stanes & Co went out of business. Stanes recalled that "the firm suffered great losses and Messrs Stanes Watson failed in business, which led to the collapse of my firm. I had to begin all over again, all that I had was 500 rupees" (about £40 at that date). Failure in business was at that time a disgrace and Robert Stanes's son, Fred, who was five at the time, remembered both the shame and also having to return to England on a cargo boat. Stanes wrote that "my dear wife endured it all without a murmur and with the greatest patience". He started again and the business again prospered. By the time of his death he owned cotton mills, coffee and tea plantations, coffee curing plants, motor works and tire retreading plants; Coimbatore is still a major industrial city today, largely through Stanes's contribution.

When Coimbatore City Council was formed, he became chairman. He set up the Stanes School in the city in 1862. His elder brother, Thomas Stanes, had established the Stanes School in Coonoor, in 1858.

In 1913, he was awarded the Kaiser-i-Hind Gold Medal for services to Coimbatore and to education and he was knighted in the 1920 New Year Honours.

Stanes died in Coimbatore in 1936 and is buried alongside his wife, Harriet Huntingdon Harris (1843–1901), at All Saints church, Coonoor.
