= Mela Raman Puthoor =

- Town
- Location in Tamil Nadu, India Mela Raman Puthoor (India)
- Coordinates: 8.17262°N 77.41899°E
- Country: India
- State: Tamil Nadu
- District: Kanyakumari

Languages
  - Official: Tamil
- Time zone: UTC+5:30 (IST)
- PIN: 629004
- Telephone code: 04652
- Vehicle registration: TN-74
- Nearest city: Nagercoil, Tirunelveli, Trivandrum
- Lok Sabha constituency: Nagercoil
- Vidhan Sabha constituency: Nagercoil
- Website: www.melaramanputhoor.com

Melaramanputhoor is a place in the Nagercoil corporation of Kanyakumari district in the Indian state of Tamil Nadu. It is situated to the West of Ramanputhoor
