= St. Xavier's Higher Secondary School, Thoothukudi =

Coordinates: 8°48′18.03″N 78°9′18.7″E

St. Francis Xavier's Higher Secondary School, Thoothukudi

Location
- Railway station Road; Thoothukudi, Tamil Nadu, Madurai Province; India

Information
- Type: Private secondary school
- Motto: Excelsio
- Religious affiliation: Catholicism
- Denomination: Society of Jesus
- Patron saint: Francis Xavier
- Established: 1884; 142 years ago
- Rector: Rev. Fr. Singarayar SJ
- Headmaster: Rev. Fr. Amalraj A SJ
- Teaching staff: 90
- Gender: Boys
- Colors: Blue Pant and White Shirt

St. Xavier's Higher Secondary School, is a private Catholic secondary school located in Tuticorin, in Tamil Nadu, India. The school is administered by the Madurai Province of the Society of Jesus. Founded in 1884, it is the oldest school in Tuticorin. It is named after the Jesuit missionary, Saint Francis Xavier. V. O. Chidambaram Pillai is one among the notable alumni of the school. Standard 6th to 12th are available here. It is a public exam center in Thoothukudi district.

== History ==
It traces its origins to a parochial school built in the 1600s during Portuguese rule in Tuticorin. In 1920 Xavier's had 563 pupils. Xavier in Thoothukudi was registered under the Tamil Nadu Societies Registration Act in 1960. In 1976 it was declared a minority institution.

== Education ==
Both Tamil and English medium classes are available here. It follows the Samacheer Kalvi education system. There are evening coaching for 10th and 12th classes as they are going to write Government Exams. There are night study for weak students who get lower grades. The Teachers here are well trained and qualified. There is a library for students to improve their knowledge.

== Extracurricular activities ==
Apart from education many extracurricular activities are available here. The school has a Naval NCC cadets section.

== Organization ==
SUPAM - A Fundraising program that helps poor students economically for medical treatments.

Alumni Association - An organization formed by the Alumni of the school. Every year, a program is held for reunion for the alumni.

== See also ==
- List of Jesuit schools
- List of schools in Tamil Nadu
