= Robert Eric Frykenberg =

Swedish-American historian

- Born: June 8, 1930
- Died: April 15, 2025 (aged 94)
- Occupations: Historian, academic and author

Academic background
- Education: Bethel University; University of Minnesota; University of London

Academic work
- Institutions: University of Wisconsin-Madison

Robert Eric Frykenberg (June 8, 1930 – April 15, 2025) was a Swedish-American historian, scholar and author. He was an emeritus professor at the University of Wisconsin-Madison.

Frykenberg is known for his seminal book, Guntur District, 1788–1848: A History of Local Influences on Central Authority in South India, This book informed all his subsequent works which covered themes including: traditional processes of power, land control and social structures, educational institutions, language issues, conversion movements, urban formations, and religions such as Christianity and syndicated modern Hinduism.

== Early life and education ==
Frykenberg was born on the 8th June 1930 in Ootacamund, Tamil Nadu, South India, he was brought up speaking Telugu. He went to Breeks Memorial School, a British boys school in Ootacamund, and Kodaikanal International School, an American school in Kodaikanal and Wheaton Academy in Illinois.

Frykenberg graduated with a B.A in history and philosophy from Bethel University in 1951; an M.A. in political science and history from the University of Minnesota in 1953; completed four years advanced study in political science at the University of California (Berkeley), and completed a PhD in the history of India from the School of Oriental and African Studies, University of London, in 1961.

== Career ==
Frykenberg began his career at the University of Chicago in 1961. In 1962, he joined the history faculty of the University of Wisconsin-Madison, becoming a full professor in 1971. At retirement in 1997, he was made emeritus professor.

In 1964 he founded the South Asia Microform Project. From 1970 to 1973, he served as chair of the South Asian Studies Department and director of the South Asia Center. In 1972, he founded the Annual Conference on South Asia. From 1994 to 1999, he directed a Pew Research Advancement Project, focusing on Christianity in India. He also delivered the annual Radhakrishnan Lectures at Oxford University in 1996. From 1997 to 2022, he was co-general editor, with Brian Stanley of University of Edinburgh, of the Eerdmans' Studies in the History of Christian Missions, which produced twenty-nine volumes of contributions to the history of Christian missions.

== Works ==
An Indo-centric perspective underlies all Frykenberg's works from his Guntur District, 1788–1848: Local Influences on Central Authority in South India (1965) onwards. Eric Stokes reviewed Guntur District, 1788–1848. Frykenberg's Christianity in India: From Beginnings to the Present (2008, 2010) examined claims that Christianity in India began with the Apostle Thomas in 52 CE. It also explored the distinct cultural characteristics of Indo-Syrian (Mar Thoma), Catholic, Evangelical (Protestant), and Pentecostal Christianity, emphasizing the significant role played by Indian (indigenous) cultures and leadership. In her review, Kristin Bloomer declared, "Until now, no single book in English had attempted to cover the vast topic of Christianity in India. Such scholarship has not only been timely but also useful for scholars of India's history and religion, as evidenced by its substantial length and depth". Moreover, in recognition of his contributions, Richard Fox Young edited India and the Indianness of Christianity: Essays on Understanding – Historical, Theological, and Bibliographical – in Honor of Robert Eric Frykenberg, in his honor. Additionally, his India's History, India's Raj: Essays in Historical Understanding (2023) emphasized the role of Indian manpower, Indian money and Indian methods in shaping India's destiny and the British Raj, addressing complexities of political unification and challenging conventional historiography.

== Research ==
Frykenberg's edited works such as Land Control and Social Structure in Indian History and Land Tenure and Peasant in South Asia have challenged simplistic Eurocentric notions of land "ownership" and "peasant" in relation to governance and state power. One of his edited books, Delhi through the Ages: Essays on Urban History, Culture, and Society, features essays that explore a broad range of topics, from the city's prehistoric origins to contemporary issues of urbanization.

Frykenberg's articles have appeared in academic journals including the Indian Economic and Social Review, the Journal of Asian Studies, Modern Asian Studies, Comparative Studies in History and Society, and the Journal of the Royal Asiatic Society.

One of Frykenberg's articles in 1986 showed how, during the emergence of modern education, command of English was driven by local communities working with the Raj. In another study, he addressed the concept of 'majority' within Indian contexts emphasizing how essential it is to differentiate between 'majority rule' and 'majority representation'. Furthermore, a 1993 essay stressed the multifaceted nature of Hinduism, in its historical, cultural, political, and social dimensions and also the distinction between "Hindu" as a geographical concept and "Hindu" as a specific set of ideas and institutions.

In 2005, Frykenberg contributed a chapter to Missions and Empire that explored the relationships between Christian missions and the Indian Empire. He highlighted how missions influenced religious renewal, social reform, and nationalism, noting that their success was often greatest when they operated far from the centers of imperial authority. A year later, a chapter in The Cambridge History of Christianity, explored how Christianity in India grew alongside imperial expansion, with Hindu elites and European scholars together shaping India's political structures and generating a syndicated "Hinduism". In The Sacred in Twentieth-Century Politics, he examined Hindutva fundamentalism as a militant nationalist movement that aims to establish a hegemonic Hindu nation through religious symbolism, caste hierarchy, and cultural homogenization. More recently, in Ecumenism and Independency in World Christianity (2020), he examined caste tensions that led 19th-century Tamil Christians to leave Anglican congregations. This migration prompted accusations of "sheep stealing" against German Pietist Lutheran missionaries. The work highlighted conflicts between Tamil Pietist leaders and the ecclesiastical authority of colonial Anglicans.

== Bibliography ==
=== Books ===
- Land Control And Social Structure in Indian History - https://archive.org/details/in.ernet.dli.2015.53542
- Guntur District, 1788-1848: A History of Local Influence and Central Authority in South India (1965) ISBN 9780198215325
- History and Belief: The Foundations of Historical Understanding (1996) ISBN 9780802807397
- Christianity in India: From Beginnings to the Present (2010) ISBN 9780199575831
- India's History, India's Raj : Essays in Historical Understanding (2023) ISBN 9789391144449

=== Selected articles ===
- Frykenberg, R. E. (1963). Traditional processes of power and administration in South India: An historical analysis of local influence. The Indian Economic and Social History Review, 1(2), 1–21. (Reprinted in 1968 as State and society: A reader in comparative political sociology (pp. 107–125), edited by Reinhold Bendix. Second reprint, 1975, in Aspects in Deccan history (pp. 99–112), edited by V. K. Bawa.)
- Frykenberg, R. E. (1977). 'Company Circari' in the Carnatic, c. 1799–1859: The inner logic of political systems in India. In R. G. Fox (Ed.), Realm and region in traditional India (pp. 117–164).
- Frykenberg, R. E. (1980). On the study of conversion movements: A review article and a theoretical note. The Indian Economic & Social History Review, 17(1), 121–138.
- Frykenberg, R. E. (1986). Modern education in South India, 1784–1854: Its roots and its role as a vehicle of integration under Company Raj. The American Historical Review, 91(1), 37–65.
- Frykenberg, R. E. (1988). The myth of English as a ‘colonialist’ imposition upon India: A reappraisal with special reference to South India. Journal of the Royal Asiatic Society, 120(2), 305–315.
- Frykenberg, R. E. (1993). Constructions of Hinduism at the nexus of history and religion. The Journal of Interdisciplinary History, 23(3), 523–550.
- Frykenberg, R. E. (2013). Christians in India: An historical overview of their complex origins. In Christians and missionaries in India (pp. 33–61). Routledge.
