= Veveaham School =

School in Dharapuram, Tamil Nadu

Location
- Thirumalaipalayam Pirivu, Udumalai Road, Dharapuram; Tamil Nadu; India; 10°41′56″N 77°29′45″E

Information
- Funding type: Private, Unaided
- Motto: Action with vision will bring out great success
- Founded: 2004
- Founder: R. Subramanian
- School board: KIDZ, CBSE & State board
- School district: Tiruppur
- Category: Day-cum boardingl
- Grades: Kindergarten - grade 12
- Gender: co-educational
- Enrollment: 4250
- Classes offered: Kindergarten - grade 12 (NEET/JEE) coaching
- Language: English
- Campus size: 22 acres
- Nickname: Veveaham Schools
- Affiliation: Tamil Nadu Board of Secondary Education & CBSE (New Delhi) -Aff.no : 1930911
- Website: Official website

Veveaham Schools are group of residential, English medium schools based on Dharapuram, Tiruppur district, India. It offers classes from Kindergarten to grade 12 and on providing a range of curriculums in Central Board of Secondary Education, Council for the Indian School Certificate Examinations and State board along with coaching for exams like NEET-UG, JEE main, CUET and Civil Services Examination.
