= Arignar Anna Government Higher Secondary School =

Secondary school in Kumbakonam, India

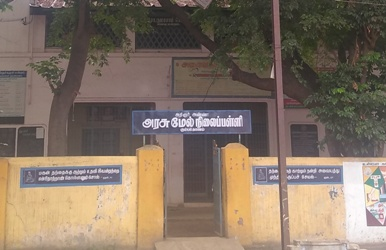
- Arignar Anna Government Higher Secondary School, Kumbakonam

Location
- Kumbakonam, Thanjavur district
- 10.9553°N 79.3673°E

Information
- Founded: 10 November 1919
- Head Master: V. Sarathi

Arignar Anna Government Higher Secondary School is a school in Kumbakonam, a town in the Thanjavur district in the Indian state of Tamil Nadu.

== Inauguration ==
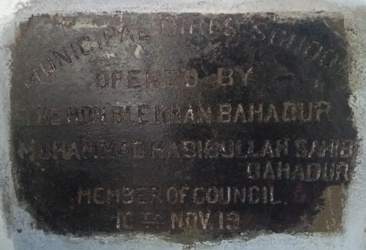
Inscription dated 10 November 1919

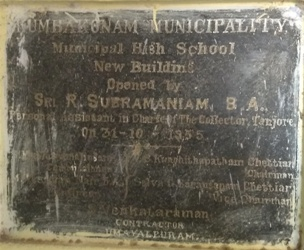
Inscription dated 31 October 1955

This school was inaugurated on 10 November 1919 by Mohamed Habibullah Sahib Bahadur, the then Municipal Councillor of Kumbakonam.

== History ==
Before inauguration the school was functioning in the house of Nataraja Pillai in Kambatta Visvanathar East Street in Kumbakonam. While there was a need for accommodating the school, Gurunatha Pillai who was living very near to the house of Nataraja Pillai, gave three acres of land. From thenon, it was called as Gurunatha Pillai School. Started with 20 students, it has now 600 students and 32 teachers. Wards of daily-wage workers and labours studied in this school. The school takes part in sports and cultural activities including drama, photography and Kabaddi. Students from the school have participated in those competitions. During the period of Kunchithapatham Chettiar, as Chairman of Kumbakonam Municipality, a new building was opened on 31 October 1955. During 1973 this school became Arignar Anna Municipal High School. In 1977-78 it became Arignar Anna Government Higher Secondary School.

== Centenary celebrations ==
In order to conduct the centenary celebrations, the alumni of the school arranged meetings on 16 June 2019, 14 July 2019 and on 15 March 2020. At the meetings, the alumni made the following decisions, among others:

- To start Smart class, to acquire furniture to the classrooms and to raise the compound wall of the school.
- To award prize to the X and XII students who got good ranks and to reimburse the tuition expenses of the poor students.
- To invite the teachers, including the retired teachers who were behind the success of the students with high percentage of marks.
- To set up a library and donate books.
- To unveil the portrait of Gurunatha Pillai who was instrumental in donating the land to the school.
- To publish a souvenir in commemoration of the Centenary Celebrations.
- To conduct the centenary celebrations in May 2020

== Administration ==
K Saravanakumari is the present headmaster of the school.

== Gallery ==
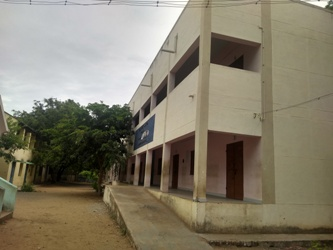

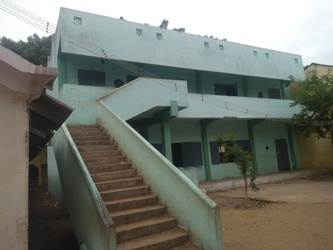

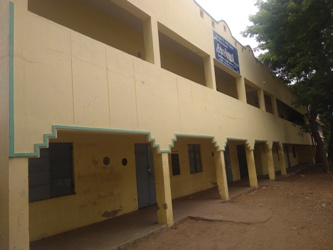

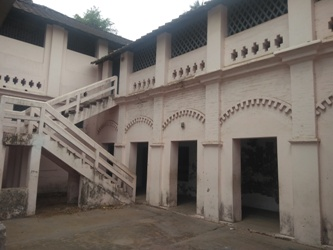

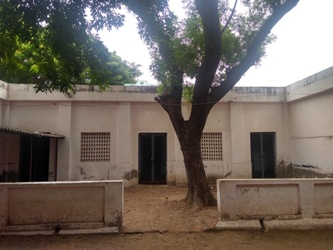

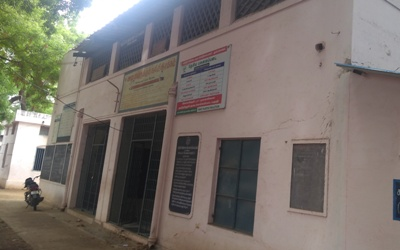

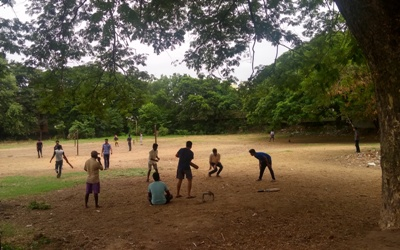
