= Muthorai Palada =

Village in Tamil Nadu, India

- Village
- Location in Tamil Nadu, India Muthorai Palada (India)
- Coordinates: 11.370705779777614°N 76.66624548294587°E
- Country: India
- State: Tamil Nadu
- District: Nilgiris

Language(s)
  - Official: Tamil
- Time zone: UTC+5:30 (IST)
- Postal code: 627101

Muthorai Palada, also known as M. Palada, is a village located about 10 km (6.2 mi) southwest of Ooty in Tamil Nadu, India. It falls within Nilgiris district. The pincode is 643004.

== Landmarks ==
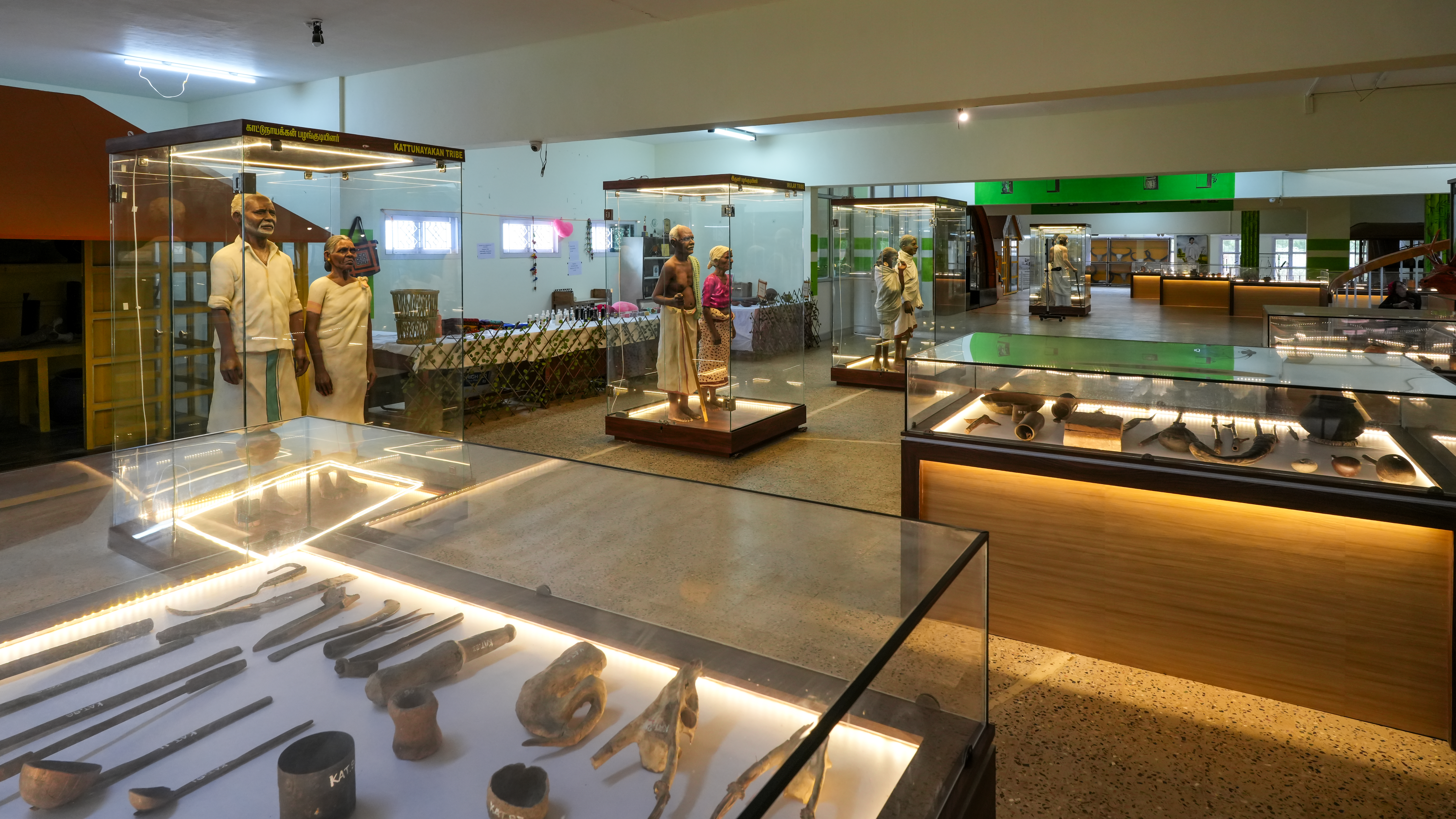
Interior of the Tribal Museum

A tribal museum was opened in 1995 in Muthorai Palada. It aims to preserve the cultural heritage of the tribes in the Nilgiris and Andamans. It is located within the Tribal Research Centre. The research center is also involved in creating livelihood opportunities for the tribal communities, and raises awareness of issues faced by the tribes. The Nilgiri Mountains have been home to several indigenous tribes including Toda, Kota, Kurumba, Irula, Paniya and Kattunayakan.

Eklavya Model Residential School in Muthorai Palada is part of Government of India's scheme for schooling of children of scheduled tribes across India.

Good Shepherd International School, founded in 1977, is located in Muthorai Palada.

== Economy ==
Agriculture is a key sector of Muthorai Palada's economy. The village has carrot, garlic and potato farms.
