= Railway Mixed High School, Erode =

Railway Mixed High School

Location
- Railway Colony, Erode; India; 11°21′00″N 77°44′00″E

Information
- Established: 13 January 1916; 110 years ago
- Website: http://railwayschoolerode.ac.in/

Railway Mixed High School is an English medium high school in Erode, Tamil Nadu. It was established as an Anglo-Indian school in the year of 1916, primarily for the benefit of Railway Employee wards. Initially started as a primary school, it has been upgraded as a High school during 1997. It is now under the Administrative control of Salem railway division.

== CBSE Curriculum ==
The school sent a proposal to transfer from Samacheer Kalvi curriculum to CBSE Curriculum, which was approved by the CBSE Board in 2015.

== Centenary Celebration ==
The school celebrated its centenary on 3 October 2016. A postal cover was released by Southern Railway in commemoration of this centenary celebration.

== See also ==
- Railway Colony Municipal Higher Secondary School
