= Alexander Wynter Blyth =

English medical man

- Born: 29 August 1845 Woolwich, London, England
- Died: 30 March February 1921 (aged 75)
- Occupation: Public health official, analytical chemist, medical officer, barrister, and author.
- Genre: Health
- Subject: Food safety, forensic toxicology, and public health reform

Alexander Wynter Blyth (29 August 1845 – 30 March 1921) was a British public health official, analytical chemist, medical officer, barrister, and author. He is best known for his contributions to food safety, forensic toxicology, and public health reform during the late 19th and early 20th centuries. Blyth's pioneering work in food analysis and poisoning detection continues to be cited long after his death.

== Early life and education ==
Blyth was born on 29 August 1845 in Woolwich, Kent, England. He was the son of Alexander Blyth (1819–1852), a naval surgeon stationed on the convict hospital ship HMS Unité, and Eleanor Meredith (1821–1898), originally from Acton Beauchamp, Worcestershire. He was the eldest of three siblings, Julia Blyth and the author Harry Blyth.

Following the early death of his father in 1852, Blyth spent part of his childhood living with relatives, including Mr. and Mrs. Wynter, from whom he later took his middle name. His early education and upbringing were shaped by the medical and naval traditions of his family.

== Career ==
Blyth initially worked as a medical assistant in Aylesbury before formally studying medicine at King's College Hospital, London, where he qualified in 1870 as Licentiate of the Society of Apothecaries (LSA) and Member of the Royal College of Surgeons (MRCS). He later studied law and was called to the Bar at Lincoln's Inn.

== Public health and analytical work ==
In 1872, while serving as a surgeon to the Worcester Amalgamated Friendly Societies, Blyth documented a smallpox outbreak affecting 32 individuals. In 1873, he was appointed Medical Officer of Health for the Bideford, Southmolton, Dulverton, and Okehampton Rural Sanitary Authorities, and in 1874, became County Analyst for Devon. He resided in Barnstaple during this period.

Blyth's duties involved the investigation of epidemics, enforcement of sanitation standards, and the analysis of food and drugs for adulteration. He quickly earned a reputation for meticulous and impactful analytical work, and by 1878 he had been appointed Public Analyst for Totnes, followed by appointments in Tiverton (1879) and London's St. Marylebone borough (1882), where he served for over three decades.

He was retained as Devon County Analyst even after relocating to London.

== Publications and scientific contributions ==
Blyth was a prolific author and researcher. His notable works include:

- A Dictionary of Hygiene and Public Health (1876)
- Old and Modern Poison Lore (1884)
- Foods: Their Composition and Analysis (1888)
- A Manual of Public Health (1890)
- Poisons: Their Effects and Detection (1906)

His books became standard references in the fields of food chemistry and forensic toxicology. The fifth edition of Poisons was published in 2008, long after his death, highlighting the lasting impact of his research. His work included investigations into butter-fat composition, the chemical properties of alkaloids, and the development of microcrystallographic techniques.

== Professional affiliations ==
Blyth held numerous honorary and leadership roles in scientific societies:

- President of the Incorporated Society of Medical Officers of Health
- Registrar of the Royal Sanitary Institute
- Council Member and Vice President of the Society of Public Analysts
- Council Member of the Institute of Chemistry (multiple terms)

He was also involved in the early days of the Society of Public Analysts and the Institute of Chemistry, both formed to professionalize and elevate the standards of applied chemistry in public service.

== Personal life ==
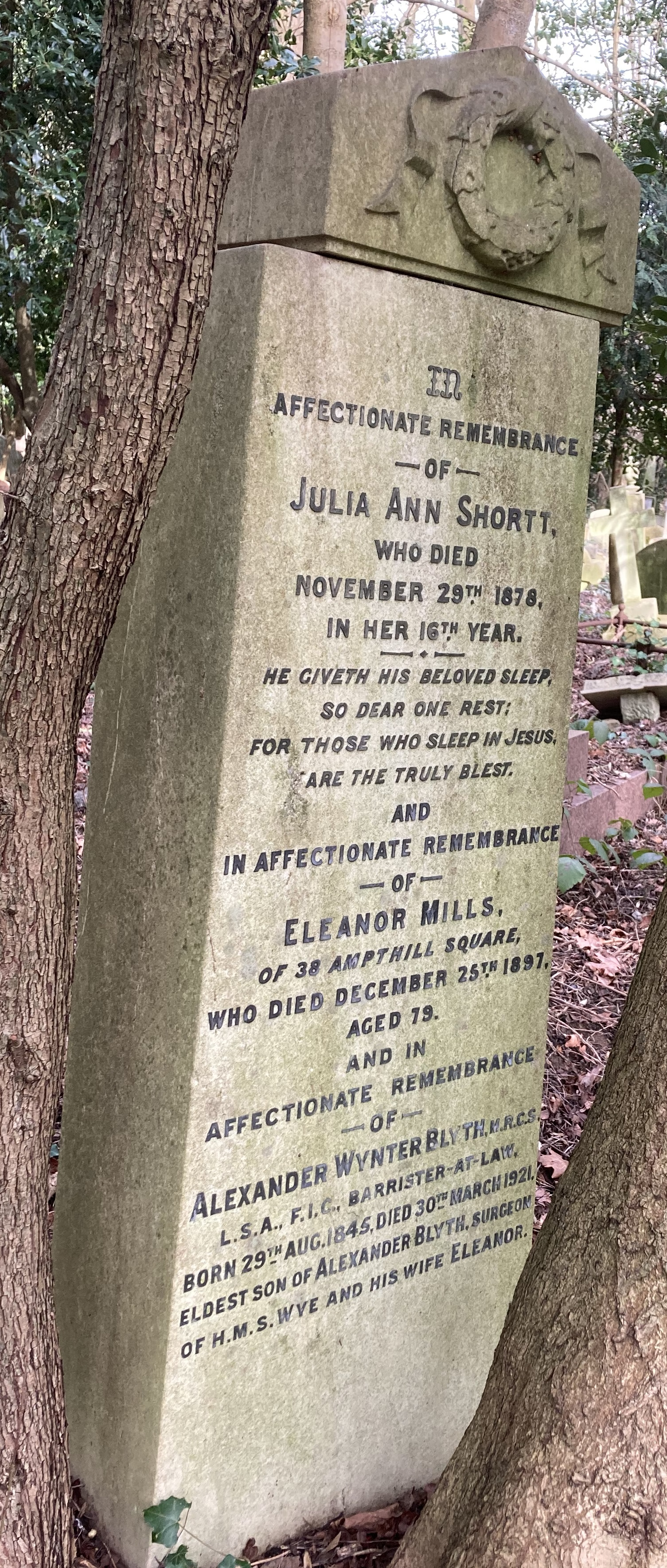
Family grave of Alexander Wynter Blyth in Highgate Cemetery

On 6 December 1864, Blyth married Ann Elizabeth Morgan (1844–1906) at St. Michael's Church, Glascoed. Ann was the daughter of a farmer at Hill Farm, Glascoed. Together, they had four children:

- Annie Julia Blyth (b. 1865, Tenbury, Worcestershire)
- Rosa Blyth (b. 1867, Tenbury, Worcestershire)
- Stewart Blyth (b. 1870, Finsbury, Middlesex)
- Meredith Blyth (b. 1872, Worcester, Worcestershire)
- Ann Elizabeth died in 1906 in Cairo, Egypt. The reason for her presence there is not documented.

He embraced the automobile early on and in 1885 became Secretary to the Society of Cyclists.

== Death and legacy ==
Blyth died suddenly in London on 30 March 1921 at the age of 76, reportedly still actively engaged in scientific revision work. His final days were spent preparing a new edition of Foods, and he had only recently completed the latest edition of Poisons with the assistance of his son. He was laid to rest on 2 April on the western side of Highgate Cemetery in the family grave alongside his mother and niece Julia Annie Shortt.

He is remembered as a pioneering figure in public health, analytical chemistry, and forensic science, whose dedication and scholarship significantly influenced the evolution of food safety standards and toxicology in the United Kingdom.
