= Odaipatti =

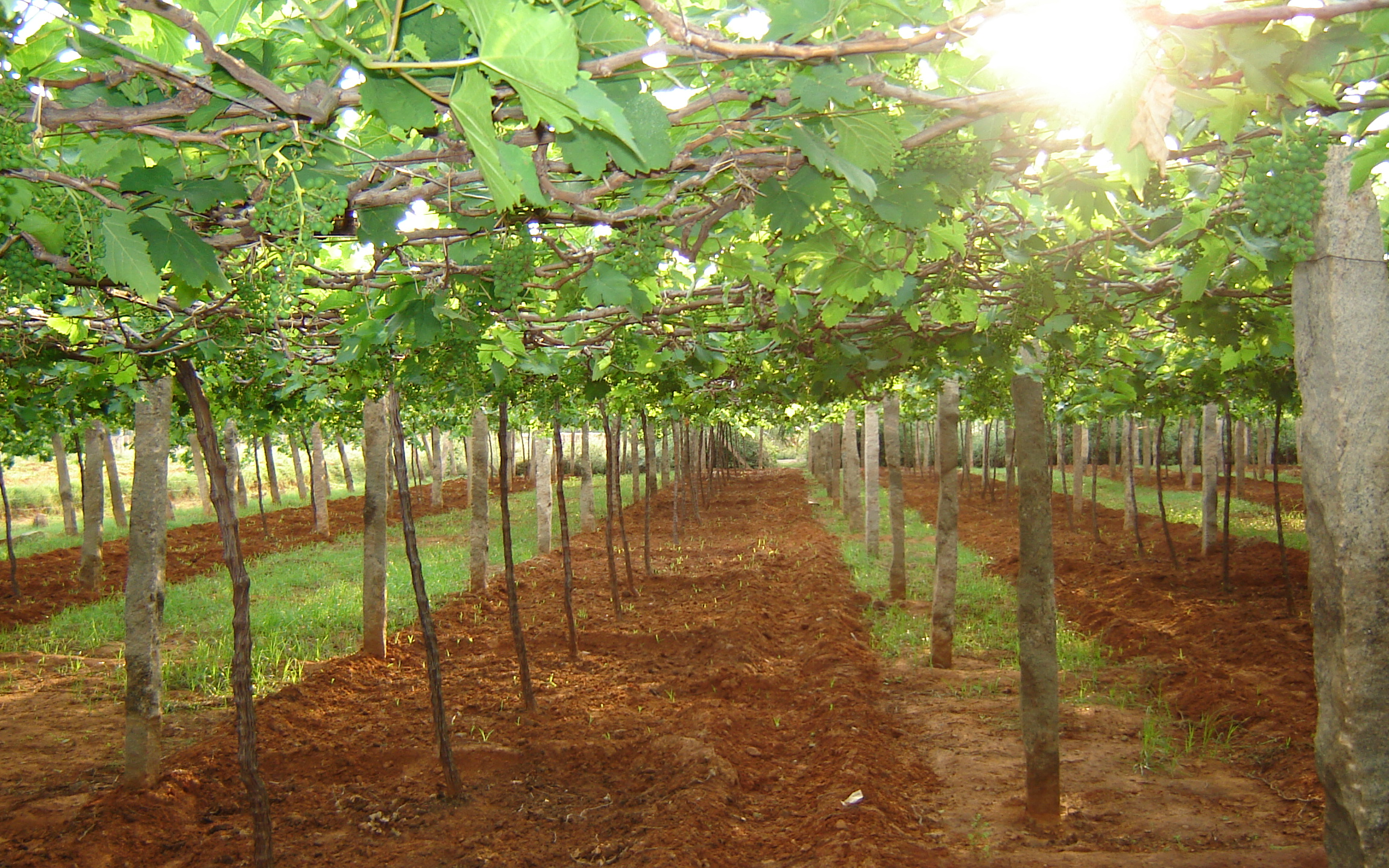
- Grape cultivation

- Location in Tamil Nadu, India Odaipatti (India)
- Coordinates: 9°59′48″N 77°17′28″E
- Country: India
- State: Tamil Nadu
- District: Theni
- Taluk: Uthamapalayam

Population (2011)
  - Total: 13,892

Languages
  - Official: Tamil
- Time zone: UTC+5:30 (IST)
- Postal code: 625540
- Telephone code: 04546
- Vehicle registration: TN60

Odaipatti is a panchayat town in Theni district in the Tamil Nadu state of India.

== Geography ==
The natural water sources are not potable.

=== Climate ===
The temperature is hot during the summer months.

== Demographics ==
=== Population ===
As of the 2011 India census, Odaipatti had a population of 13,892. The sex ratio in 2011 was 49.8% male and 50.2% female, which contrasts with the national average of 943 females per 1000 males according to the same census. Odaipatti has an average literacy rate of 69.8%, which is lower than the national average of 74.04%. Male literacy is 76%, while female literacy is 52%. In Odaipatti, 8.4% of the population are under 7 years of age.

== Economy ==
The major industry sector in this town is the cultivation of grapes, bananas, beans, and coconuts.

== Education ==
The Odaipatti Government Higher Secondary School is the main educational facility in the town. Students received the Runner up prize in Kho kho at South-Zone level in 2007, 2008, 2009, 2010. Odaipatti School alumni who were ex-servicemen conducted the ″Namathu Kiramam Namathu Kalvichalai″. Purified drinking water facilities are available on school premises.
