= Rathika Ramasamy =

Indian wildlife photographer

- Born: Venkatachalapuram Theni, Tamil Nadu, India
- Occupation: Wildlife photographer

Rathika Ramasamy is an Indian wildlife photographer. She is based in Chennai and operates as a freelance photographer. She has received many accolades for her photographs and has been called the "first Indian woman to strike an international reputation as a wildlife photographer".

== Biography ==
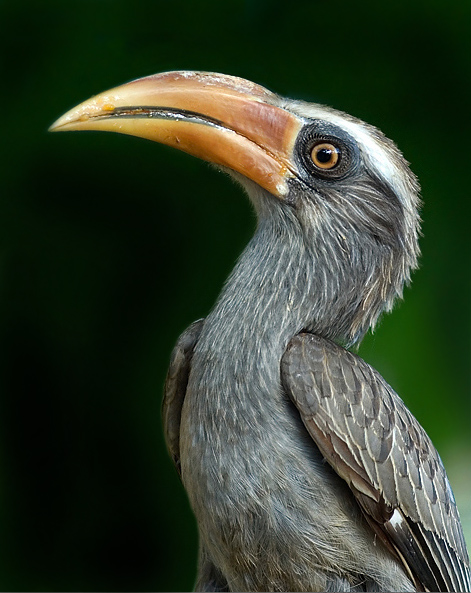
Malabar grey hornbill (Ocyceros griseus'), a Western Ghat endemic bird

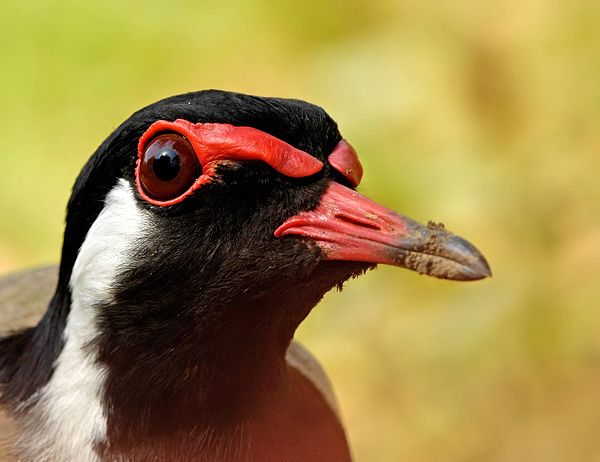
Red-wattled lapwing (Vanellus indicus)

Rathika has lived in New Delhi since 1999, after her marriage. She has a degree in computer engineering and an MBA, and worked as a software engineering for several years before becoming a full-time photographer.

Rathika received her first camera from her uncle, an amateur photographer himself, and began shooting pictures of trees and flowers. In 2003 she visited the Keoladeo National Park in Bharatpur and took pictures of birds. She began visiting the Okhla Bird Sanctuary regularly, studying the behaviour of various types of birds. Thereafter, she took to wildlife photography as her professional interest and visited many national parks in India, Kenya, and Tanzania.

Her wildlife photography was featured at the "Clean Ganga Campaign" held in September 2005 at the India International Centre, New Delhi. In 2007, the Jawaharlal Nehru University's annual calendar featured her bird photographs. The "Birds of India" chose her as one of the Top 20 best photographers of India in 2008, the only woman to receive the distinction. Besides participating in wildlife exhibitions, she conducts workshops on wildlife photography.

Rathika is among the founding members of the Photography Arts Association of India.

== Works ==
Rathika self-published her first book, The Best of Wildlife Moments, in 2014.

== Awards ==
- 2015: Inspiring Icon Award, Sathyabama University, Chennai
- 2015: International Camera Fair (ICF) award, for her excellence in wildlife photography.

== See also ==
- List of Indian women artists
