= Mahatma Gandhi Centenary Vidyalaya =

Mahatma Gandhi Centenary Vidhyalaya
- Type: Private CBSE School
- Established: 1969
- Founder: Vidya Seva Ratnam K.SANTHANAM Founder - Secretary
- Location: Tiruchirappalli, Tamil Nadu, India
- Campus: Tennur High Road, Trichy-620017
- Website: https://www.mgcvschool.ac.in/

Mahatma Gandhi Centenary Vidhyalaya (MGCV) is an English medium co-educational school affiliated to Central Board of Secondary Education (CBSE) in Tiruchirappalli, Tamil Nadu, India. It was founded in 1969 honoring the birth centenary of Mahatma Gandhi by late K Santhanam, who was the founder secretary. Santhanam (1930 to 2007), a chartered accountant, also founded other educational institutions in Tiruchirapalli.

== Campus ==
Mahatma Gandhi Centenary Vidhyalaya provides education from nursery to Class X. To ensure the complete development of the children, the school encourages the students to take part in various co-curricular activities held in school, including music, dance, arts, and sports.

The campus is equipped with infrastructural facilities, including classrooms, access to teaching aids, library, computer labs, science labs, and playground. It also has an auditorium. Smart classes have also been installed by Educomp to provide a new method of teaching to the students.

From the year 2011, K Krishnaveni, retired as principal and Jikki Kanagavalli of the English department, took over.
