= Kalinjur =

- neighbourhood
- Location in Tamil Nadu, India
- Coordinates: 12°57′50″N 79°07′44″E
- Country: India
- State: Tamil Nadu
- District: Vellore

Government
  - Body: Vellore Municipal Corporation
  - Mayor: Mrs.P. Karthiyayini

Population (2001)
  - Total: 16,918

Languages
  - Official: Tamil
- Time zone: UTC+5:30 (IST)
- PIN: 632006
- Vehicle registration: TN23
- Civic agency: Vellore Municipal Corporation

Kalinjur is a locality in Vellore City in the Indian state of Tamil Nadu.It comes under the zone-2 of Vellore Municipal Corporation

== Demographics ==
As of 2001 India census, Kalinjur had a population of 16,918. Males constitute 50% of the population and females 50%. Kalinjur has an average literacy rate of 73%, higher than the national average of 59.5%: male literacy is 80%, and female literacy is 67%. In Kalinjur, 11% of the population is under 6 years of age.
