= Venkatachalapuram =

- Village
- Nickname: V. C. Puram
- Location in Tamil Nadu, India Venkatachalapuram (India)
- Coordinates: 9.918°N 77.473°E
- Country: India
- State: Tamil Nadu
- District: Theni
- Named for: Lord Venkatajalapathi (Venkateshwara)

Government
  - Type: Village panchayat
  - Body: Gram sabha
- Elevation: 100 m (330 ft)

Population (2011)
  - Total: 2,406

Languages
  - Official: Tamil
- Time zone: UTC+5:30 (IST)
- Postal code: 625534
- Vehicle registration: TN-60

Venkatachalapuram (வெங்கடாசலபுரம்) is a small village situated in Theni District, Tamil Nadu, India, 11 kilometres (6.8 mi) south of the district headquarters, Theni.

== Politics and district administration ==
The Venkatachalapuram village panchayat comes under Theni Panchayat Union (block). The village comes under the Bodinayakkanur state assembly constituency and the Theni Lok Sabha constituency. Current Member of Parliament is Mr. Thanga Tamil Selvanrepresenting Theni Lok Sabha constituency (33) from Dravida Munnetra Kazhagam (DMK) Party. Current Member of legislative Assembly (MLA) is Mr. O. Panneerselvam representing Bodinayakkanur Assembly constituency (200) from Dravida Munnetra Kazhagam. As per revenue administration, this village comes under Periyakulam revenue division, Theni revenue taluk, Koduvilarpatti revenue firka, and Jangalpatti revenue village. The Theni district collector is R. Vaithinathan IAS who took charge as collector on 31 May 2026.Dr. Bhukya Sneha Priya IPS is current Superintendent of police of Theni district who assumed charge on 21 July 2025.

== Population ==
As of India's 2011 census, the population of the village was 2,406 (1,156 male and 1,250 female). It has a scheduled caste population of 329 with no scheduled tribe population.

== Notable person ==
- Rathika Ramasamy, wildlife photographer, was born in this village.
