= Kavaraipettai =

Coordinates: 13°21′N 80°09′E

Kavaraipettai Rathnapuri
- town
- Interactive map of Kavaraipettai
- Country: India
- State: Tamil Nadu
- District: Tiruvallur
- Metro: Chennai

Government
  - Body: Municipality

Languages
  - Official: Tamil
- Time zone: UTC+5:30 (IST)
- PIN: 601206
- Telephone code: 044

Kavaraipettai is a suburb in North Chennai, in the Tiruvallur district in the Indian state of Tamil Nadu. It is about 30 miles (48 km) from Chennai.

== Transport ==
Kavaraipettai is connected by road and rail networks. The Chennai Airport lies 60 km (37 mi) to the south. The major roads connecting Chennai and Kavaraipettai is the Chennai–Kolkata Highway Road. Kavaraipettai lies on National Highway 16. Suburban trains ply between Kavaraipettai and Chennai Central. City buses operated by the Metropolitan Transport Corporation (MTC) play an important role in transportation.
