= Stanes Schools =

Stantes Schools
- Club Road, Bedford, Coonoor; Avinashi Road, Coimbatore; Tamil Nadu; India

Information
- Motto: Nisi Dominus Frustra — Coonoor Stanes; Excelsa Sequar — Coimbatore Stanes
- Established: 1862; 164 years ago
- Staff: 136
- Enrollment: 3000+
- Song: To God be the Glory
- Website: stanesschool.org

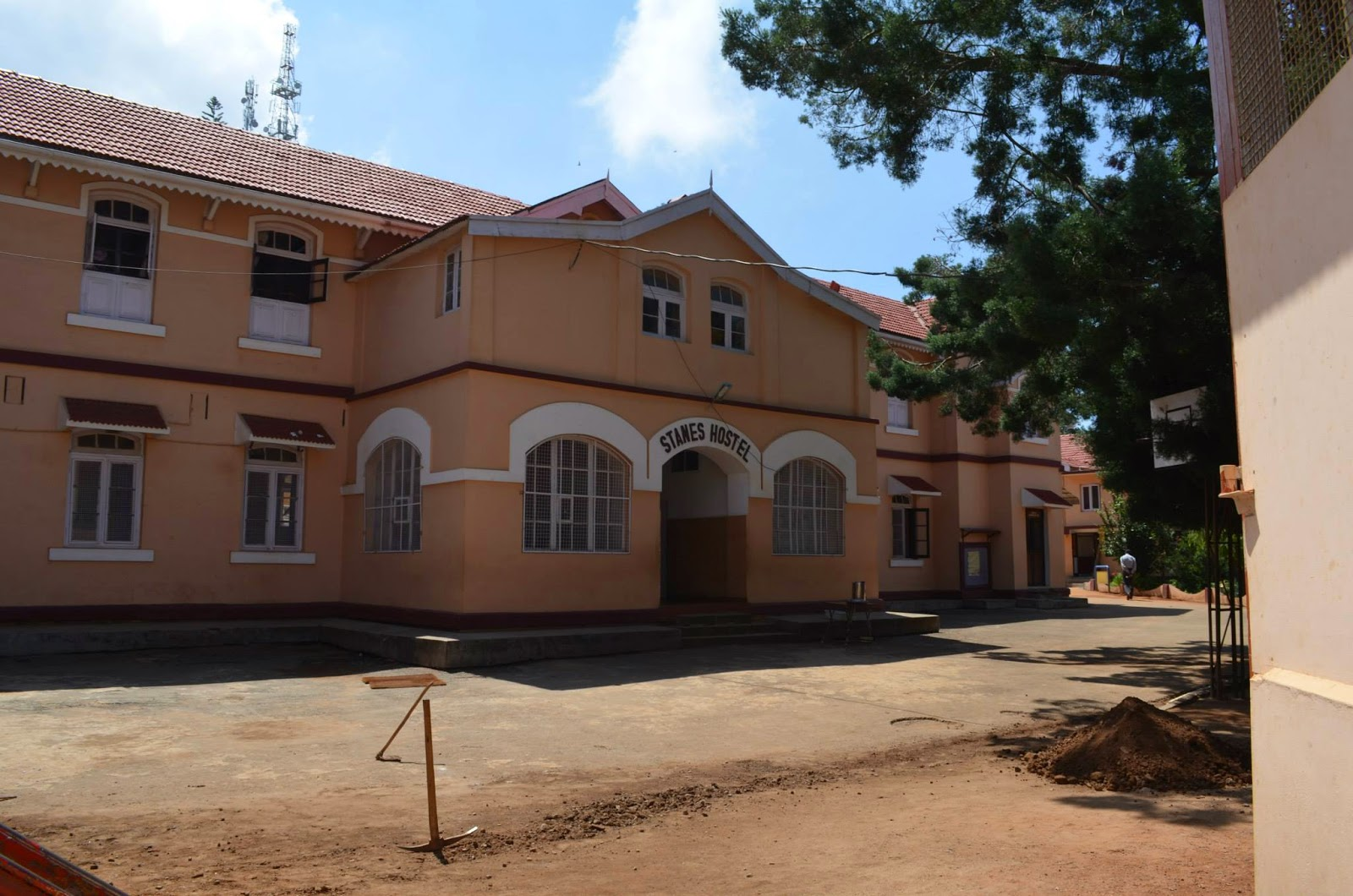
Stanes school Coonoor hostel

Stanes Schools are two schools in Coimbatore and Coonoor.

== History ==
Sir Robert Stanes

The schools were established by Sir Robert Stanes in 1862, with the Coimbatore branch starting with four children and two teachers. It started as a European and Eurasian school but under the concept of liberal education the restrictions have been relaxed, but minority rights for Anglo-Indian children are still retained.

== Foundation ==
Sir Robert Stanes (born 13 May 1841) laid the foundation stone of the school on 6 November 1862 when the school had four children and two teachers. The British Empire conferred on him The Kaiser-i-Hind Medal for his Meritorious Services. It started as a European And Eurasian School but later it was opened to all irrespective of their creed, community and status. Exclusive minority rights for Anglo-Indian children are retained as per Sir Robert's wishes.

== Houses ==
The boys and girls are grouped into four houses. Each house is headed by its own Master and Mistress and its Captains, Prefects, and Vice-Captains. The houses are:

Coimbatore School

- Lordly Lions, motto: Animo et Fide, red
- Playful Panthers, motto: Nil Desperandum, black
- Terrific Tigers, motto: Spring to Victory, yellow
- Wily Wolves, motto: Fide et Labore, green

Coonoor School

- Davids - yellow
- Fritchley - red
- Groves - green
- Stanes - blue

Inter-house sports and games are conducted. The house which emerges victorious is awarded the Champion House trophy. There are trophies for the cross country race and marching. The Annual Sports Day is an important event.

== Notable alumni ==
- Parvez Dewan- Tourism Secretary of India, IAS; Advisor (cabinet minister), J&K; founder Indpaedia
- Nirupama Rao - Foreign Secretary of India, IFS
- Narain Karthikeyan - F1 (First Indian), A1GP and NASCAR racing driver
- Adam Sinclair - Indian field hockey player
- Arvind Krishna - CEO, IBM.
- Mahesh Bhupathi - Indian Tennis Player
- P. R. Krishna Kumar
- Narayan Jagadeesan - Indian Cricketer, Chennai Super Kings, IPL (T20)
- G. D. Gopal
- Rima Kallingal, Indian Film Actress
