= Breeks Memorial School =

Breeks Memorial Anglo-Indian Higher Secondary School

Location
- Charing Cross; Ooty, Tamil Nadu, 643001; India
- Coordinates: 11.4127°N 76.7075°E

Information
- Motto: Ad Rem Latin (To the point)
- Religious affiliation: Christianity
- Established: 1874; 152 years ago
- Founder: British Government
- Status: Open
- Sister school: Breeks All India Secondary
- School district: Nilgris
- Headmaster: K. Saravana Chandar
- Grades: 1–12
- Gender: Co-Educational
- Age range: 5–18
- Enrollment: ~800
- Student to teacher ratio: 1:26
- Education system: Tamilnadu State Board
- Language: British English
- Hours in school day: 6
- Campuses: Charing Cross; Botanical Garden; Collectorate
- Campus type: Rural
- Houses: Willy; Bury; Theobald; Fox
- Colours: Cardinal red and black
- Song: "High in the Nilgris"
- Fight song: We the Breeks
- Yearbook: Breeks Chatter Box

Breeks Memorial Anglo-Indian Higher Secondary School is a Christian co-educational school established in 1874. It was named after James Wilkinson Breeks, the first Commissioner (District Collector) of the Nilgiris. It was erected for the children of Europeans and Eurasians by public subscription shortly after his death, as a memorial to his services to the Nilgiris community. The first non Christian principal and correspondent was N Raman. He headed the school for a very long time. The school is 1.5 km from the Government Botanical Gardens, Ooty.

== History ==
On the death of Mr. J.W. Breeks the first commissioner of Nilgiris in 1872, it was decided that a memorial in the form of a school should be built in his name. The public, government, municipality and the trustees raised funds. The foundation stone of Breeks Memorial School was laid in 1872, the school was completed in 1874 and follows Anglo Indian syllabus up to secondary school. Higher secondary school follows the state board. The Breeks All-India Hr Sec School, opened in 1974, is located on the same campus and follows the Central Board of Secondary Education. This school is managed separately.

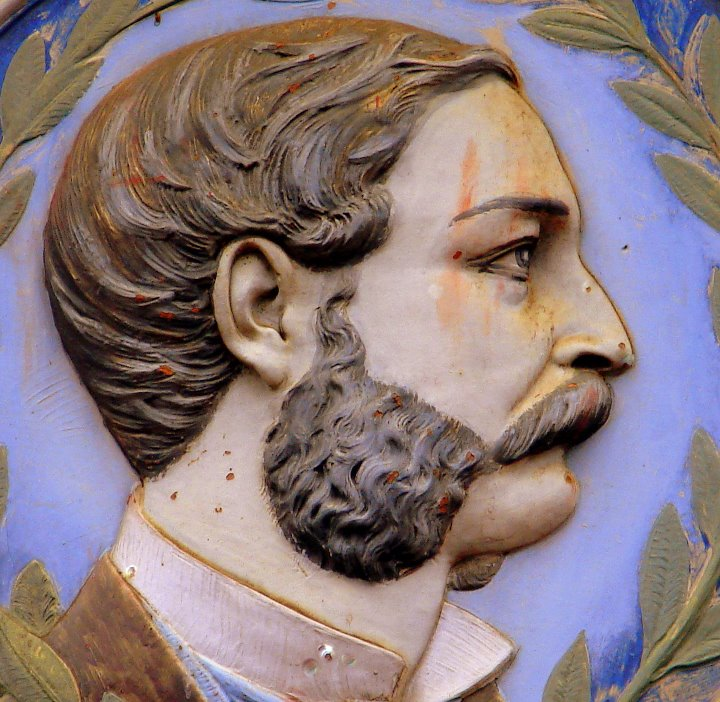
Portrait of Breeks, (the first Collector of Nilgris) in the main block of Breeks Memorial School.

== Building ==
The school was started in a heritage building, which is now a part of the Nilgiris District Court complex. The district court with its unique clock tower which is one of the oldest in Tamil Nadu, was originally a part of Breeks Memorial School. It was then moved to Charing Cross near the Adams Fountain in 1886. The special architectural features are the cloister vault roof, the arched masonry decorations seen above many of the rectangular doors and windows, gable decoration above the central building.

== Education ==
It was in this institution where Lord Macaulay, who visited Ooty once in 1834, coined the syllabi of the education system for India under the British rule, which still remains as the backbone of the modern Indian education system. He called an educational system that would create a class of anglicised Indians who would serve as cultural intermediaries between the British and the Indians. By doing so, Macaulay wanted to "educate a people who cannot at present be educated by means of their mother tongue" and thus, by incorporating English, he sought to "enrich" the Indian languages so "that they could become vehicles for European scientific, historical, and literary expression".

== Houses ==
Breeks Memorial School follows a traditional housing system. There are four houses which are named Willy, Bury, Theobald and Fox after four principals E.A. Willy, Mr. Bury, W.M. Theobald, and Mr. Fox.

== Notable alumni ==
- Timothy A Gonsalves graduated 1969: Founding Director (2010-2020) of IIT Mandi, Himachal Pradesh, India.
- Robert Eric Frykenberg, American historian and author
