= List of girls' schools in India =

This is a list of girls' schools in India.

== Assam ==
- Holy Child School Guwahati, Guwahati
- Tarini Choudhury Govt. Girls H.S. & M.P. School, Guwahati

== Andhra Pradesh ==
- Jamiat Ul Mominat, Hyderabad

== Bihar ==
- Mount Carmel School, Bhagalpur
- Notre Dame Academy, Patna
- St. Joseph's Convent High School, Patna

== Delhi ==
- Convent of Jesus and Mary Delhi, New Delhi
- Lady Irwin School, New Delhi
- Loreto Convent School, Delhi Cantt
- Mater Dei School, New Delhi
- Queen Mary's School, Rohini

== Goa ==
- St. Mary's Convent High School, Mapusa

== Gujarat ==
- Arya Kanya Gurukul, Porbandar
- Rajkumar College, Rajkot
- RB Ranchhodlal Chhotalal Girls High School, Ahmadabad

== Haryana ==
- Convent of Jesus and Mary Ambala, Ambala Cantt
- Government Girls School, Kanwari
- Vidya Devi Jindal School, Hisar

== Himachal Pradesh ==
- Convent of Jesus and Mary, Shimla

== Jammu and Kashmir ==
- Mallinson Girls School, Srinagar
- Presentation Convent Higher Secondary School, Rajbagh
- Woodlands House School, Srinagar (separate girls' wing)

== Jharkhand ==
- Bishop Westcott Girls' School, Ranchi
- Sacred Heart Convent School, Jamshedpur

== Karnataka ==
- Baldwin Girls' High School, Bangalore
- Bishop Cotton Girls' School, Bangalore
- Goodwill's Girls' School, Fraser Town
- Sophia High School, Bangalore (middle and high school are girls only)

== Kerala ==
- Baker Memorial Girls High School, Kottayam
- Government Higher Secondary School for Girls Cottonhill, Vazhuthacaud
- Holy Angel's Convent Trivandrum, Thiruvananthapuram (girls only after IV)
- Mount Carmel Convent Anglo-Indian Girls High School, Tangasseri
- Nirmala Bhavan Higher Secondary School, Kowdiar
- Sacred Heart Girls' High School, Thalassery
- St. Mary's Convent Girls High School, Ollur
- St. Mary's Girls High School, Kozhencherry
- St. Philomena's Girls High School, Poonthura
- St. Raphael's Convent Girls High School, Ollur

== Madhya Pradesh ==
- Barli Development Institute for Rural Women, Indore
- St Joseph's Convent School, Bhopal
- St. Raphael's Girls' Higher Secondary School, Indore
- Scindia Kanya Vidyalaya, Gwalior

== Maharashtra ==
- Alexandra Girls' English Institution, Mumbai
- Fort Convent School, Mumbai
- Girton High School, Mumbai
- Holy Cross Convent High School, Thane
- J.B. Petit High School for Girls, Mumbai
- Kimmins High School, Panchgani
- Mary Immaculate Girls' High School, Mumbai
- Mount Carmel Convent School, Pune
- Queen Mary School, Mumbai
- St. Anne's High School, Mumbai
- St. Anne's School, Pune
- St Joseph's Convent High School, Vile Parle
- St. Joseph's Convent School, Panchgani
- St. Mary's Convent High School, Mulund
- Walsingham House School, South Mumbai

== Manipur ==
- Little Flower School, Imphal

== Meghalaya ==
- Christian Girls' Higher Secondary School, Tura

== Odisha ==
- Carmel School, Rourkela
- Dabugaon Girls High School, Nawrangpur
- Government Girls' High School, Rayagada
- St Joseph's Convent School, Rourkela
- Sushilavati Government Women's Junior College, Rourkela

== Rajasthan ==
- Birla Balika Vidyapeeth, Pilani
- Heritage Girls School, Udaipur
- Maharani Gayatri Devi Girls' Public School, Jaipur
- Mahi Girls' School, Pratapgarh
- Mayo College Girls School, Ajmer
- Rajmata Krishna Kumari Girls' Public School, Jaisalmer
- Rajmata Krishna Kumari Girls' Public School, Jodhpur

== Tamil Nadu ==
- Holy Angels Anglo Indian Higher Secondary School, Chennai
- Rosary Matriculation Higher Secondary School, Santhome
- St Ebba's School, Chennai
- St. Francis Anglo-Indian Girls School, Coimbatore
- St. Ignatius' Convent Higher Secondary School, Palayamkottai
- St. John's Girls Higher Secondary School, Nazareth
- St. Joseph's Anglo-Indian Higher Secondary School, Perambur
- St. Joseph's School, Trichy
- St Joseph's Matriculation Higher Secondary School, Coimbatore
- St. Kevin's Anglo Indian High School, Chennai
- St. Theresa's Girls' Higher Secondary School, Pallavaram
- Victoria Girls Higher Secondary School, Thoothukkudi

== Telangana ==
- Rosary Convent High School, Hyderabad
- St. Ann's High School, Secunderabad
- Stanley Girls High School, Hyderabad
- Wesley Girls High School, Secunderabad

== Uttar Pradesh ==
- Akbarpur Girls Inter College, Akbarpur
- Central Hindu Girls School, Varanasi
- Girls' High School and College, Prayagraj
- Government Girls Inter College, Dildarnagar
- La Martiniere Lucknow Girls' Campus, Lucknow
- Loreto Convent, Lucknow
- Mount Carmel College, Lucknow
- Pardada Pardadi School, Anupshahar
- St. Agnes' Loreto Day School, Lucknow
- St. Mary's Convent Inter College, Prayagraj

== Uttarakhand ==
- Convent of Jesus and Mary, Mussoorie
- Ecole Globale International Girls' School, Dehradun
- Mussoorie International School, Mussoorie
- St. Mary's Convent High School, Nainital
- Unison World School, Dehradun
- Welham Girls' School, Dehradun

== West Bengal ==
- Arambagh Girls' High School, Arambag
- Barlow Girls' High School, Malda
- Begri Girls High School, Domjur
- Burdwan Municipal Girls' High School, Burdwan
- Carmel Convent High School, Durgapur
- Gangarampur Girls' High School, Gangarampur
- Howrah Sangha Adarsha Balika Vidyalaya, Howrah
- Kalikrishna Girls' High School, Barasat
- Kalimpong Girls' High School, Kalimpong
- Kola Union Jogendra Girls High School, Kolaghat
- Loreto Convent, Asansol
- Majilpur Shyamsundar Balika Vidyalaya, Jaynagar Majilpur
- Nandapur Milani Balika Vidyaniketan, Chandipur
- Rajkumari Santanamoyee Girls' High School, Tamluk
- Rampurhat Girls' High School, Rampurhat
- Sibpur Hindu Girls High School, Shibpur
- St Joseph's Convent, Chandannagar
- Suniti Academy, Cooch Behar

Contai

- Contai Chandramani Brahmo Girls' School
- Contai Hindu Girls' School

Kolkata (Calcutta)

- Ashok Hall Girls' Higher Secondary School
- Bankim Ghosh Memorial Girls' High School
- Barisha Girls' High School
- Behala Girls' High School
- Beltala Girls' High School
- Bidya Bharati Girls' High School
- Binodini Girls' High School
- Brahmo Balika Shikshalaya
- The Calcutta Anglo Gujarati School (separate girls' school)
- Calcutta Girls' High School
- Carmel School
- Dum Dum Motijheel Girls' High School
- Garfa Dhirendranath Memorial Girls' High School
- Holy Child Girls' High School
- Holy Child Institute Girls' Higher Secondary School
- Jadavpur Sammilita Girls' High School
- Jodhpur Park Girls’ High School
- Kamala Chatterjee School
- Kamala Girls' High School
- La Martiniere Calcutta Girls' Campus
- Loreto House
- Loreto Schools
- Maheshwari Girls' School
- Nivedita Vidyapith
- Our Lady Queen of the Missions School
- Ramakrishna Sarada Mission Sister Nivedita Girls' School
- St. John's Diocesan Girls' Higher Secondary School
- Sakhawat Memorial Govt. Girls' High School
- Shri Shikshayatan School
- Sree Sarada Ashram Balika Vidyalaya

Darjeeling

- Loreto Convent
- Maharani Girls' High School

Gazole

- Ram Chandra Saha Balika Vidyalaya
- Shyam Sukhi Balika Siksha Niketan

Midnapore

- Aligunj Rishi Raj Narayan Balika Vidyalaya
- Midnapore Collegiate Girls' High School
- Mission Girls' High School
- Vidyasagar Vidyapith Girls' High School

Ranaghat

- Brajabala Girls' High School
- Pal Choudhury High School

Serampore

- Ramesh Chandra Girl's High School
- Serampore Girl's High School (Akna Girl's High School)

== Former schools ==
- Hindu Mahila Vidyalaya
