= Spectrum mall =

Spectrum mall may refer to:

- Spectrum Mall (Chennai), a shopping mall in Chennai, India
- Christown Spectrum Mall, a shopping mall in Phoenix, Arizona, United States
