= St Francis Anglo-Indian Girls High School (Coimbatore) =

School in Coimbatore,Tamil Nadu

Coordinates: 10.9955°N 76.9720°E

- Coimbatore, India, Tamil Nadu

Information
- Established: 1878
- Language: English

St. Francis Anglo-Indian High School is a government-aided institution established in 1878. It operates under a private aided management and is located in an urban area—specifically within the city of Coimbatore, in the Coimbatore district of Tamil Nadu. The school offers classes from Standard 1 to 10 and is an all-girls' school. English is the medium of instruction. The school is accessible via an all-weather road, and the academic year begins in April.

== Facilities ==
There are 20 classrooms. A perimeter wall has been constructed around the school. The school is equipped with drinking water facilities and restrooms. Additionally, the school has a library and a playground.

== See also ==
- Education in Tamil Nadu
- Franciscan Missionaries of Mary
- List of girls' schools in India
