= South India Buddha Vihar, Perambur =

Monastery in Chennai, Tamil Nadu, India

South India Buddha Vihar
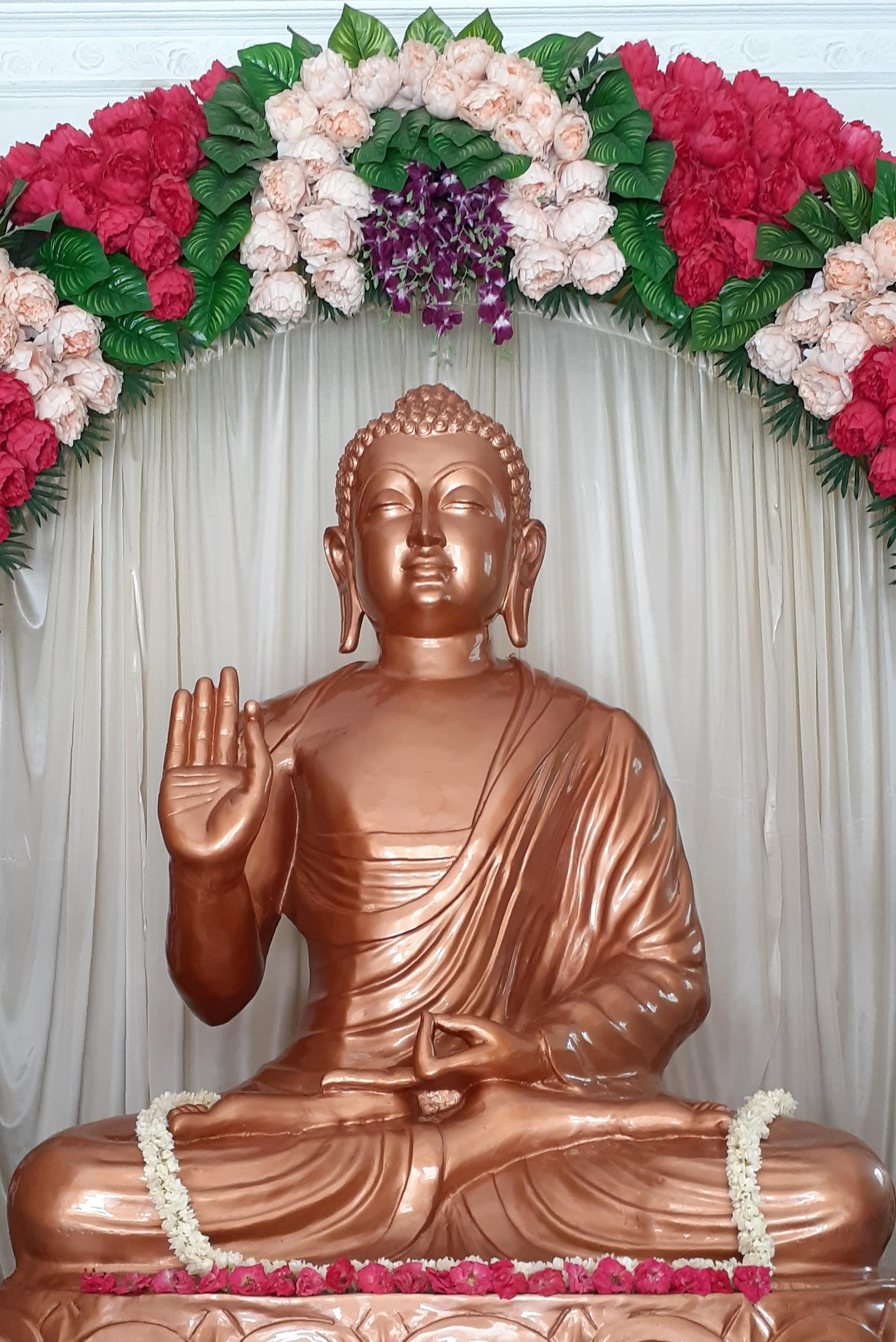
- South India Buddha Vihar, Perambur, Chennai, Tamil Nadu, India

- South India Buddha Vihar, Perambur, Chennai

Religion
- Affiliation: Buddhism
- Deity: The Buddha
- Status: Functioning

Location
- Location: Bunder Garden Main Street
- Municipality: Greater Chennai Corporation
- State: Tamil Nadu
- Country: India
- Interactive map of South India Buddha Vihar
- Coordinates: 13.110315°N 80.241668°E

Architecture
- Established: 1906 and rebuilt - 14 January 2018

Specifications
- Shrine: One
- Elevation: 29.9 m (98 ft)

South India Buddha Vihar is a monastery situated at Perambur, in Chennai of Tamil Nadu state in India.

This is also called as 'South India Buddhist Vihara'.

== History ==
This monastery was built in 1906 by South India Buddhist Association. and reconstructed and open to public on 14 January 2018 by the Buddhist monks from Burma, Cambodia, Sri Lanka and Thailand and the members of the South India Buddhist Association. The monastery has an idol of 6 ft. high Buddha sitting in a meditation posture. To propagate the Buddhism in the city, is the principles of the monastery.

== Location ==
This monastery is located with the coordinates of (13.110315°N 80.241668°E) at Perambur, Chennai.

South India Buddha Vihar, Perambur (Chennai)
