= Pardada Pardadi Educational Society =

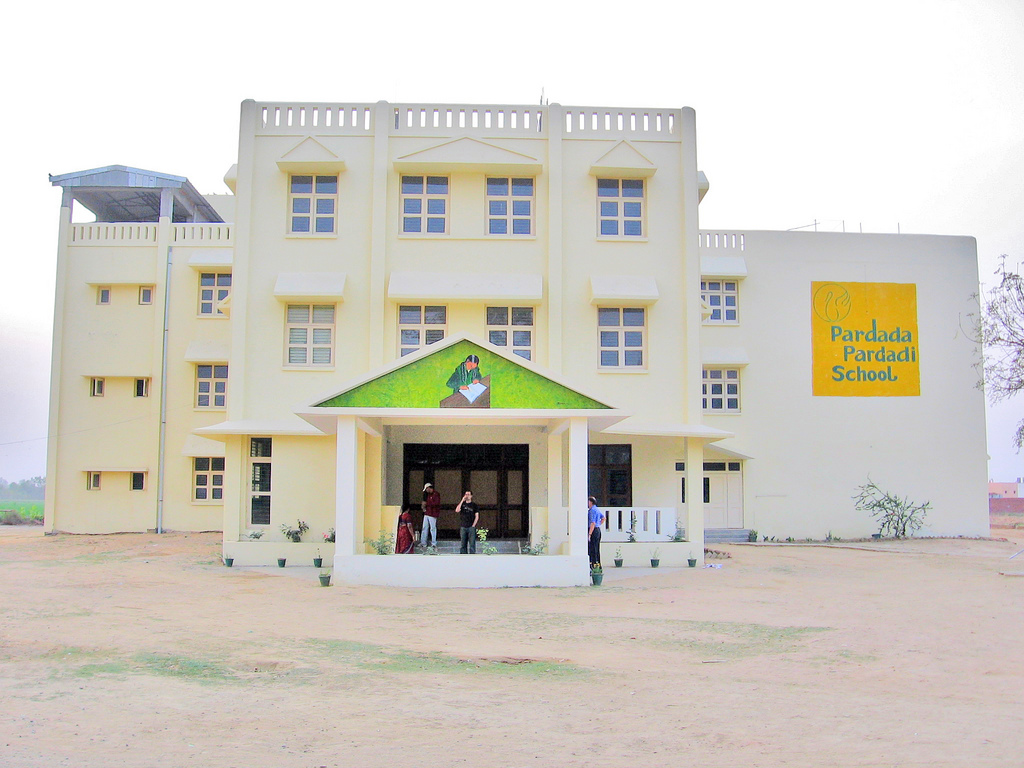
- PPES School
- Anupshahar, Uttar Pradesh; India

Information
- Motto: From the Village to the World
- Founded: 2000
- Founder: Virendra (Sam) Singh
- School district: Bulandshahr
- Grades: 3-12
- Language: Hindi
- Colors: Green, Gold
- Key products: textile arts Raghav sharma
- Tuition: free
- Website: https://pardadapardadi.org

Pardada Pardadi Educational Society is a non-profit organisation based in Anupshahar, Bulandshahr district, Uttar Pradesh, India. Its members work towards the educational, economic and social empowerment of girls and women.

Pardada Pardadi translates into English as "great grand parents". The phrase Pardada Pardadi is used as an analogy for the ancient Indian wisdom of knowledge and education which helps in the full blossoming of an individual.

== Anupshahar and Uttar Pradesh ==
Uttar Pradesh is the most populous and the fifth largest state in the Republic of India. While the national average female literacy rate is 53.7%, that of Uttar Pradesh falls to 42.48% (both figures from 2001 census). In the town of Anupshahar itself, this number dips a bit further to just 41%. While these figures show improvement over 1991 figures (39.29% India, 24.37% U.P.), a great deal of work still needs to be done.

The education of the girl child is particularly problematic in this area where the culture favors boys and men. This favoritism is reflected in the ratio of females to males in Uttar Pradesh: 898 women per 1000 men, compared to 933 women to 1000 men] nationally. Everyday girls and women face gender discrimination in various guises. These include female feticide, nutritional and economic disparities with male members of the family, as well as violence in and out of the home.

== History ==
Pardada Pardadi Educational Society (PPES) was established in 2000 by Virender (Sam) Singh, a retired U.S. Dupont South Asia head, who grew up in Anupshahar. Based in this rural setting, the organisation works to address the issue of gender bias in society and to raise rural girls and their families out of their state of poverty. To that end PPES developed an educational programme and set up the Pardada Pardadi School.

In 2000, the school started with 45 girls from the poorest families of the area; today the school has about 1750 students from over 100 villages. In 2006, PPES' first graduating class saw 13 of 14 girls pass their 10th Standard U.P. Board Exams, 10 with 1st Division marks. In light of their successes at board level, PPES plans to expand its mission beyond the school and, with support from individual donors and corporations worldwide primary schools have been built in the villages surrounding Anupshahar.

Following Sam Singh's philosophy that "a model is only good if it can be replicated", the school aims to become self-sustainable in the next seven years. The school was intentionally designed to serve as a model to be used in other parts of India or in other developing countries to address the issues of gender bias and poverty.

== Pardada Pardadi Schools ==
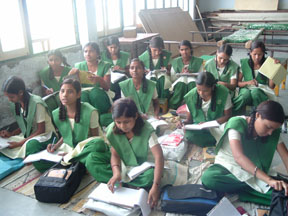
9th class English, PPGVS

The school serves Anupshahar and surrounding villages, admitting girls who come from extremely poor families—generally those who earn less than 600 rupees per household per month (approx. US$14.91). The draw of a free education complete with free textbooks and free meals encourages families who might otherwise not send their daughters to school - either for lack of money or for lack of interest - to allow their girls to get an education.

The girls are further encouraged to attend school regularly by the school's plan to set up a bank account for each girl into which 10 INR are deposited for every day she comes to school. The account is set up jointly in the names of the girl and her mother, and the money is given only once the girl has passed class 10th at the time of the girl's marriage (if this is after her 18th birthday) or on her 21st birthday, whichever comes first. By the time of her graduation, a girl can expect to have saved about 30,000 INR (approx. US$745).

The school continues to support its students even after they have graduated by encouraging further studies or by guaranteeing each girl a job working with the organisation in the academic, marketing or vocational departments. The Radio Feature or Radiomentary "Anupshahar Mein Gandhi," written by Dr. Hargulal Gupta and produced by Naveen K. Gupta, Programme Executive, All India Radio Delhi, which highlighted this unique institution and the work of Sam Singh won the Public Service Broadcasting Award for Gandhian Philosophy for the year 2010.

=== Academic education ===
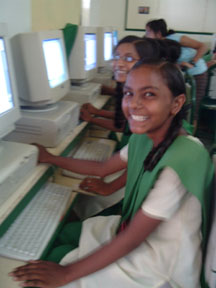
Student in computer lab, PPGVS

In the mornings the girls attend academic classes in subjects including History, Mathematics, English and Music - the school curriculum follows that set by the U.P. Board. In 2004, through a grant from the Public Affairs Office of the US Embassy in Delhi, the school was able to set up a computer lab for the girls to have computer classes twice a week. Through a major grant from Cargill's corporate responsibility NGO (based in Switzerland) the physical size of the school was increased by a third to include a science wing. This will allow students to be educated at a higher level (inter-college) in the sciences to include IT. In addition to the regular teaching staff, the school also enlists volunteers to introduce and implement forward-thinking teaching methods and to assist in teaching English as well as other subjects.

=== Vocational training ===
In the early years during the academic year, afternoons were spent in vocational classes where the girls are trained in highly marketable textile arts like hand embroidery or stitching. In their vocational classes, the girls produced fine hand embroidered linen appliqué work and block printing as well as table cloths, luncheon sets, bed covers and sheets, curtains, and cushion covers. This vocational training is now available to girls who will not pursue extended secondary education or post-secondary education. It continues to provide these students with a marketable skill they can use to support themselves after graduation.

School products are sold on the internet or through the organisation shops in Delhi and Bulandshahr.

=== Value-Based education ===
The school strives to expand its services to its girls by including non-academic, non-vocational elements in its curriculum. The value-based education also includes lessons on leadership and personality development, health and hygiene, legal awareness, and ethics.

About once a month, cultural programs expose the girls to various aspects of Indian culture and also allow them to show off their singing or dancing abilities.

== Community Outreach ==
Since the founding of the society, PPES has expanded its mission of development beyond education to include community outreach in various areas. These efforts have included educational plays put on by PPES students, a toilet construction programme, and health and cataract camps open to the community at large.

In July 2008, PPES began an initiative, called "Rags to Pads", to produce low-cost menstrual pads to be sold to local women. In an area where women often use dirty rags to control their menstrual flow, PPES hopes that the availability of low-cost sanitary pads will reduce the incidence of vaginal infections and urinary tract infections. As part of this initiative, the organisation will also train PPGVS graduates to operate the production and marketing of this business.

Since 2006 Pardada Pardadi has run a volunteer program.
