= Bishop Cotton Girls' School =

Coordinates: 12.9704°N 77.6014°E

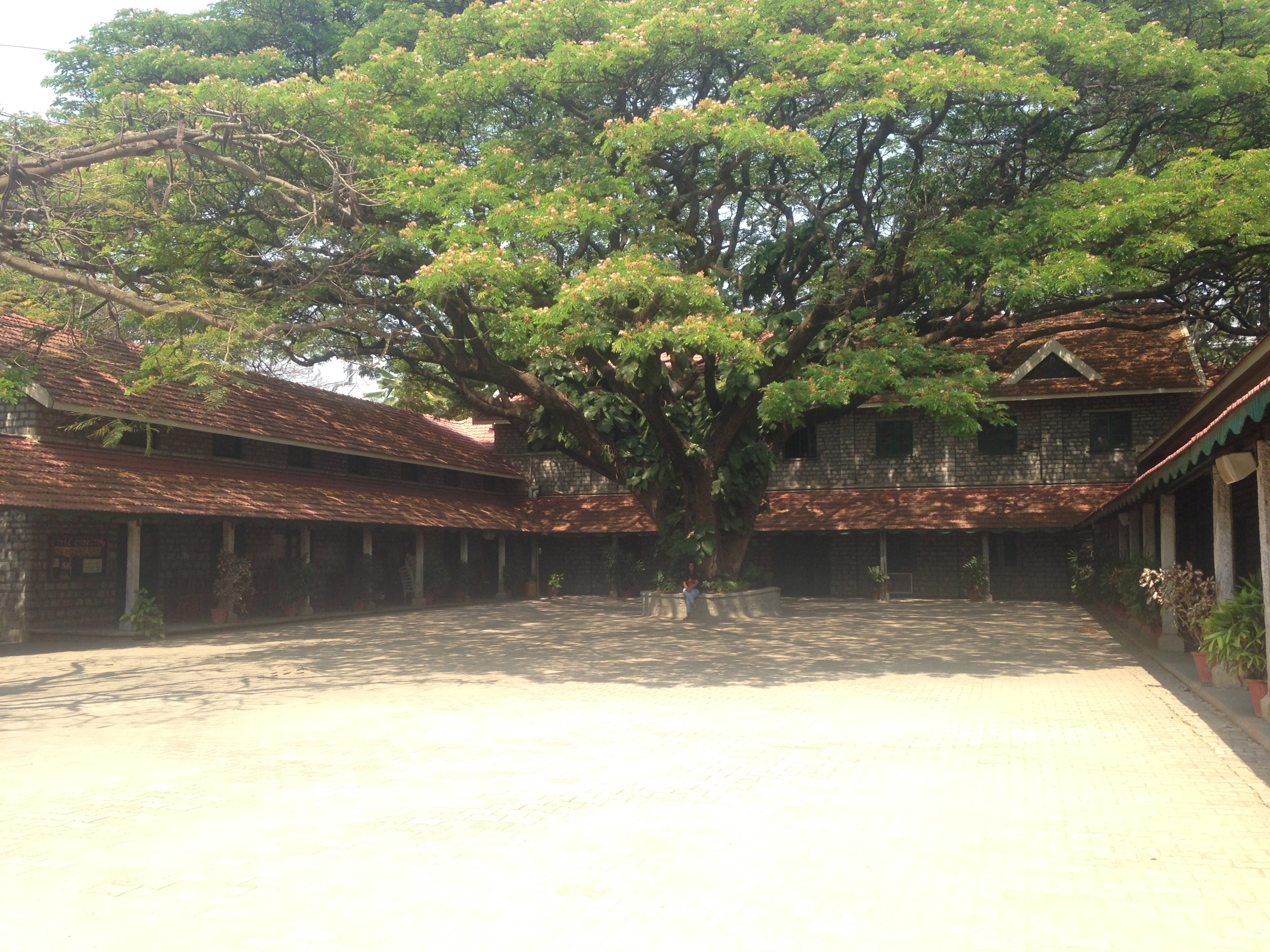

Location
- St. Marks Road; Bengaluru, Karnataka, 560 001; India

Information
- Type: Private school, boarding school
- Motto: Nec Dextrorsum Nec Sinistrorsum (Neither to the right nor to the left)
- Religious affiliation: Protestant (Church of South India)
- Established: 1865; 161 years ago
- Founders: Rev. S.T. Pettigrew; Rev. J. Gordon; Rev. R. Firth
- Chairman and Moderator: Rt. Rev. (Dr.) Prasanna Kumar Samuel (Karnataka Southern Diocese)
- Principal: Lavanya Mitran
- Staff: 150 (approx.)
- Gender: Girls
- Age: 4+
- Houses: Barton, Elmes, Foley, Maiden, Millington, Waller
- Colours: Green and gold
- Publication: The Cottonian
- Affiliation: ICSE, ISC

Bishop Cotton Girls' School, or BCGS, is a private all-girls' school for boarders and day scholars in Bengaluru, Karnataka, India. It has been awarded the International School award by the British Council.

The school curriculum is based on the ICSE format of education, and has teaching facilities from Kindergarten, 1 to 10 (ICSE) and 11 and 12 (ISC).

== History ==
Founded in 1865, it is one of the oldest established boarding schools in Asia.

The school was named after Bishop George Edward Lynch Cotton, the son of an Army captain, who died leading his regiment in battle. He was a scholar of Westminster School, and a graduate of Cambridge. In 1836 he was appointed Assistant Master at Rugby by Doctor Thomas Arnold, one of the founders of the British public school system.

It was the proposal of Bishop Cotton to create schools in India that resulted in the founding of Bishop Cotton's on 19 April 1865. The institution was opened for both boys and girls in a bungalow named Westward Ho in High Grounds. In 1871, the management acquired 14 acres of land on St. Mark's Road and shifted the school, demarcating two areas, one for the boys school and the other for the girls, with a wall separating the two.

In 1911, the management acquired Stafford House and its surrounding eight and a half acres with access to both Residency Road and St. Mark's Road and shifted the school, giving Bishop Cotton Girls' School its own identity. In 1915, money was sanctioned to construct the administration block and the quad. More buildings were constructed in the 1950s and 1960s including the Chapel of the Holy Family.

The first Indian principal to take charge of the school was CA (Acca) Joseph in 1963.

Extracurricular activities includes sport, debate, creative writing, dramatics, declamation, verse speaking and choir.

It is affiliated with Bishop Cotton Boys School, which is situated across the street on St. Marks Road.

== School song and founder's hymn ==
The Bishop Cotton school song was penned by Rev. Herbert Pakenham-Walsh, of the Brotherhood of St. Peter, Warden of the school from 1907 to 1913, later to become bishop. The words were set to music by N. M. Saunders, Esq. With its refrain "On, Straight, On", it follows the spirit of the school motto, "Nec Dextrorsum Nec Sinistrorsum", Latin for "Neither to the Right Nor to the Left". The tradition of singing the school song and the founder's hymn in the chapel or in assemblies held in the auditorium continues to this day.

== Academics ==
The school, administered along the lines of Junior, Middle and Senior School, works through three school terms, each ending with examinations. Students of Class X appear for the Indian Certificate of Secondary Education Examination (ICSE) by the beginning of March. Students of Class XII take up the Indian School Certificate Examination (ISC).

Subjects taught at the ICSE level include English, an Indian or foreign language, History, Civics and Geography, Environmental Education, Mathematics, Physics, Chemistry, Biology and a choice between Home Science, Computer Applications, Fine Arts and Physical Education. At the ISC level, the school has three main streams, the Science stream, the Commerce stream and the Arts stream. It is mandatory for both streams to take up English and Environmental Education.

For the Science stream, the subjects offered are English, Environmental Education, Physics, Chemistry, Mathematics/Home Science and Biotechnology, Computer Science, Hindi, Kannada, Fine Arts, Biology and Environmental Science. For the Commerce stream, the subjects offered are Accountancy and Commerce and a choice between Business Studies, Mathematics, Economics, Computer Science, Fine Arts, Environmental Science and Physical Education. For the Arts stream the subjects offered are English, Environmental Education and History along with choices among Literature in English, Second Language, Environmental Science, Physical Education, Economics, Computer Science, Fine Art, Home Science, Business Studies, Political Science and Psychology.

The school offers language options of Kannada, Hindi, Tamil, Telugu, Malayalam, Bengali, Nepali, French and German.

== Sports ==
Organized games includes the inter-school games competitions.

- Cottonian Shield - basketball
- Cottonian Shield - hockey

== Principals ==
- Miss F Elmes (1913–1934) was the first principal. She expanded the building adjoining Stafford House.
- Miss R.M. Waller (1935–1944).
- Miss M.E. Hardy (1945–1952) came to Cottons after years of service as a missionary in Burma.
- Miss E.J. Drayton (January 1953 – 2 June 1953).
- Mrs. C.M. Gaughan (1953–1954).
- Miss C.B. Schiff (1954–1957). The building of the Art Room and the extension of the Staff Room were accomplished during her tenure.
- Miss C.M. Millington (1958–1962) had been on the Staff of the school before she took over as Principal. The Raman Science Block and the Chapel of the Holy Family were constructed during this time. The Examination system changed over from the Cambridge Certificate to the Indian School Certificate Examination (ISC).
- Mrs. Acca Joseph (1963–1972) took over as the first Indian Principal in 1963. The library was inaugurated and the boarding block was built.
- Miss Grace Samuel (1972–1973) came to Cotton's after nine years in the USA.
- Mrs. V.M. Chandran (1973–1978) a member of the staff from 1959, took over as Principal in 1973. Her achievement was the construction of the auditorium, although she did not stay to witness its completion, it was her enthusiasm and hard work that made it possible. The Parents' Block was inaugurated during this period.
- Mrs. G. Clarke (1978–1988) introduced two new Houses - Elmes and Waller - to the existing Barton, Foley and Maiden Houses, as the number of students had increased. The pale green tunics changed to dark green. Computer studies were introduced. The strength of the School went from 700 to 3000. Six additional classrooms were built and the shift system was introduced. The work on the auditorium was completed and a new Dining Hall for the boarders was planned. The Bishop Cotton Women's' Christian College was started in 1985, the first of its kind in the Diocese.
- Mrs. Elizabeth Joseph (1988–1999) a member of staff from 1971, took over as Principal in September 1988. Several structural extensions and additions were made during this period. The auditorium was renovated, the mezzanine floor and stage built with co-ordinating interiors and the lighting system. The hostel side of the campus acquired a multi-purpose Dining Hall with the Staff Quarters built above it.
- Dr. Mrs. Stella Samuel (1999–2005) took over as Principal in June 1999 after having served the school for 25 years as a member of the staff. She had joined the school in 1974. The Administrative block was renovated, and the ISC block took shape. A school transport system in collaboration with BMTC was introduced. Internet, intranet, fax and email were installed.
- Mrs. Princess Franklyn (2005–2010) was brought on a transfer from a School in Tumkur.
- Mrs. Lydia Joshua (2010–2014).
- Princess Franklyn returned (June 2014 – October 2014). During the course of the academic year she had to retire and left Ranjitha Kanagaraj as the principal-in-charge.
- Dr. Mrs. Lavanya Mithran (2014–2025). The school celebrated its 150th anniversary in 2015. Lumierre- I was held to mark this celebration. The Sesquicentennial Block was constructed replacing the building next to G.U. Pope Block. A multi-purpose hall was constructed. In 2025, the school celebrated its 160th anniversary and Lumierre- II was held to commemorate it.
- Mrs. Christy Priyadharsini F. (2025–Present).

== Notable alumni ==
- Anuradha Doddaballapur, cardiovascular scientist and captain of the Germany women's national cricket team
- Patralekha Paul, Bollywood actress
- J Jayalalithaa Puratchi Thalaivi Selvi J Jayalalithaa, actress, politician, General Secretary of AIADMK and Chief Minister of Tamil Nadu, India
- Gautami, South Indian actor
- Kiran Mazumdar-Shaw, chairman and managing director of Biocon Ltd., and India's richest woman in 2004
- Nafisa Joseph, Miss India Universe 1997, model, and an animal rights activist
- Rani Jeyraj, Miss India first runner-up 1996
- Sharmila Nicollet, ranked India No. 1 in golf
- Monisha Unni, South Indian actress
- Nikki Galrani, South Indian actress
- Kriti Kharbanda, Bollywood actress
- Dr Kamini A. Rao, Indian gynaecologist
- Sreeleela, South Indian actress

== See also ==
- List of girls' schools in India
