= Railway Mixed Higher Secondary School, Perambur =

School in Chennai, Tamil Nadu, India

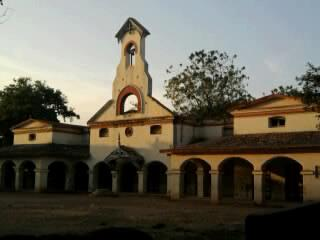
- Railway Mixed Higher Secondary School on 2012

Location
- Perambur, Chennai, Tamil Nadu; India
- Coordinates: 13°06′32″N 80°14′15″E

Information
- Established: 1891
- Principal: T. Siva Kumar

Railway Mixed Higher Secondary School is a secondary school in Perambur, Chennai, India and was founded by the East India Company in 1891. It was originally created for children of railway employees under British rule, but it is now open to the public.

== Enrollment ==
Enrollment varies by year, but the school has averaged 2000 students per year since 1990.

== Leadership ==
=== Principals ===
Principal	Year	Year
Bala Sundaram	1990	2002
J. Rajendaran	2002	2010
Dhakshanamurthi	2011	2012
Suchetha Sathyamoorthi		
T. Siva Kumar	2017	2024

=== Vice principals ===
Vice Principal	Year	Year
Sawmi Nathan	2012	Present

== Closure of railway schools ==
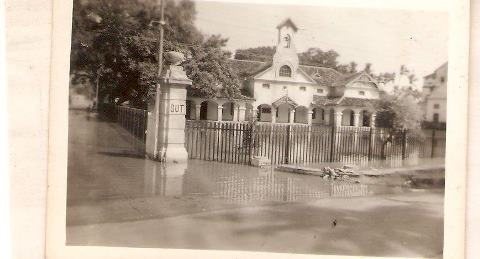
RHMSS in [rainy] season

In 2018, Indian Railways announced its intent to withdraw support for its Railway Schools after the 2018–19 school year. Later, it revised its position, announcing support for schools with fifteen to twenty wards of railway employees.

== Notable alumni ==
- V. Anantha Nageswaran – 18th Chief Economic Advisor to the Government of India
