= Our Lady of Lourdes Shrine =

- Our Lady of Lourdes Shrine, Perambur, Chennai, Tamil Nadu
- 13°06′32.8″N 80°14′27.0″E
- Location: Perambur, Chennai, Tamil Nadu
- Country: India
- Denomination: Catholic church
- Website: http://www.lourdesshrineperambur.org

History
- Status: Parish church
- Dedication: Our Lady of Lourdes

Architecture
- Functional status: Active
- Architectural type: Chapel
- Style: Gothic Revival

Administration
- Archdiocese: Archdiocese of Madras and Mylapore
- Parish: Perambur

Our Lady of Lourdes Shrine is a Catholic church in Chennai, India.

== Location ==
It is located in Perambur, Chennai in Tamil Nadu with the geographic coordinates of 13°06′32.8″N 80°14′27.0″E at an altitude of 34.23 m above the mean sea level.

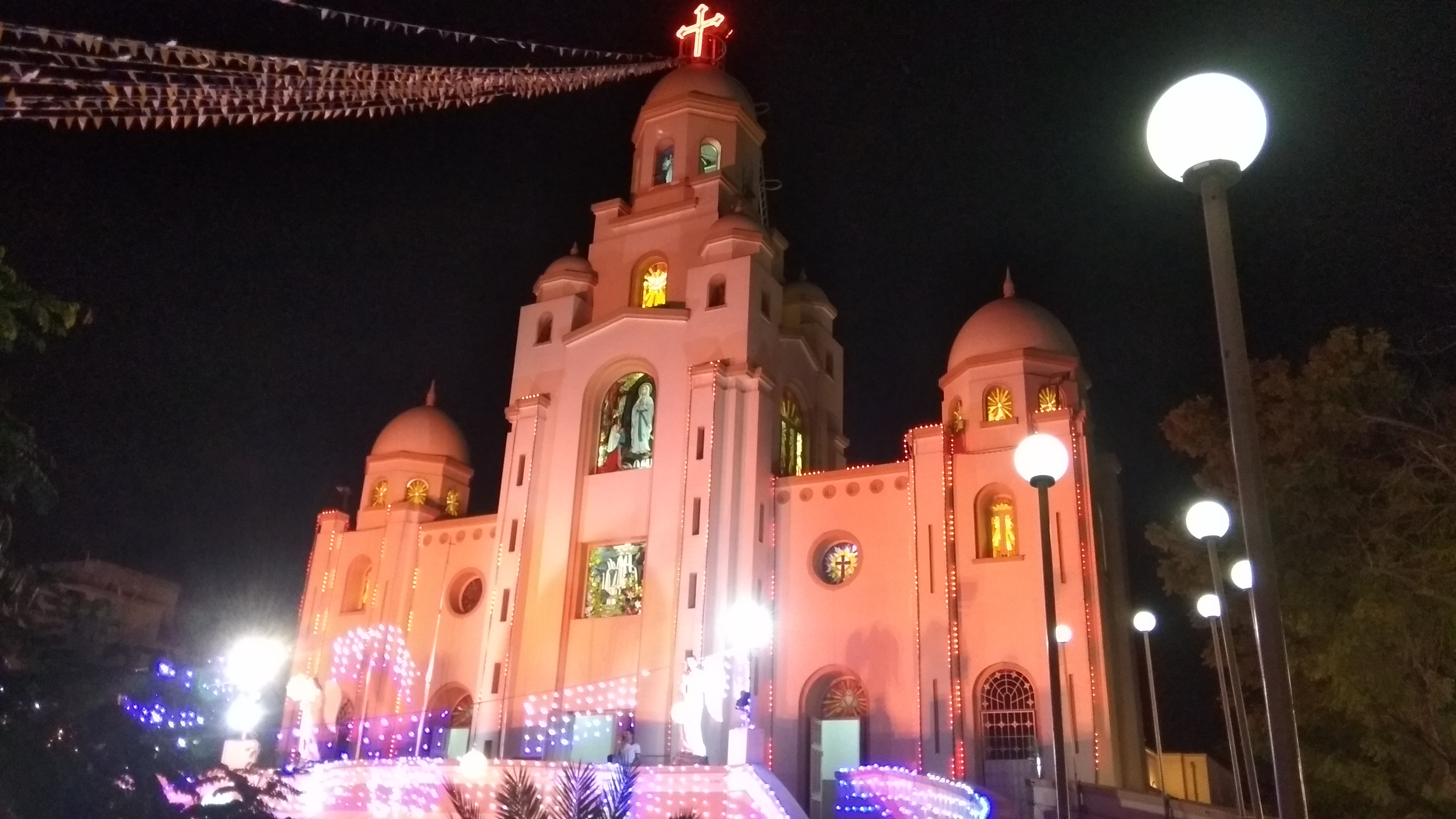
chennai perambur roman catholic church

== Details ==
This is the first shrine in India dedicated to Our Lady of Lourdes. This church is considered to be a replica of the Basilica at Lourdes in France.
