= Kamini A. Rao =

Indian gynaecologist

Dr Kamini A. Rao
- Born: 2 July 1953 (age 73); Bangalore, Karnataka, India
- Education: St. John's Medical College, Bangalore
- Medical career
- Profession: Medical Director, Milann and Gynaecologist
- Sub-specialties: Reproductive Medicine, Assisted Reproductive Techniques
- Awards: Padma Shri award for Medicine-Reproductive Medicine in 2014

Dr. Kamini A. Rao is a pioneer in the field of Assisted Reproduction in India. She has specialized in reproductive endocrinology, ovarian physiology and assisted reproductive technology and has been awarded the Padma Sri, one of India's highest civilian awards. Dr. Kamini A. Rao is the co-founder and chairperson at Dr. Kamini Rao Hospitals.

== Life and career ==
Her early education was at Bishop Cotton Girls' High School, Bangalore. Then she studied medicine at St. John's Medical College, Bangalore. Dr. Kamini has been professionally trained in Fetal Invasive Therapy under Prof. Kypros Nicolaides, Harris Birthright Research Centre for Fetal Medicine, King's College School of Medicine, London, U.K and has undergone Laser Surgery training in South Cleveland Hospital, Middlesbrough, U.K., under Prof. Ray Garry.

Rao is credited with the birth of India's First SIFT Baby. She has the distinction of having set up South India 's first Semen Bank as well as having engineered South India's First Babies born through ICSI (Intra Cytoplasmic Sperm Injection) as well as through Laser Assisted Hatching.

== Awards ==
- Padma Shri Awards in 2014
- Karnataka State Award (Rajyotsava Award) for invaluable service in the field of medicine.
- Vidya Ratan Award for invaluable service in the field of medicine.
- Lifetime Achievement Honours Tribute Award, for dedicated service to the Nation & Profession, from the Vivekananda Institute of Human Excellence, Hyderabad.
- Aryabhatta Award from the Aryabhatta Cultural Organisation for excellence in the field of medicine.
- B.C. Roy District Award from the Shimoga district unit of Indian Medical Association.
- Lifetime Achievement Award from the Bangalore Society of Obstetrics & Gynecology
- Lifetime Achievement Award from the Federation of Obstetric & Gynecological Societies of India
- Elected fellowship of the National Academy of Medical Sciences

== Publications ==
- Handbook of Obstetric Emergencies (2003) Japee Brothers Medical Publishers, ISBN 8180610896
- The Infertility Manual (2005) Anshan Publishers, co-authored by Peter R. Brinsden and A. Henry Sathananthan, ISBN 1904798160
- Textbook of Midwifery and Obstetrics for Nurses Elsevier India, ISBN 8131221881
- Endoscopy in Infertility (2007) Anshan Publishers, co-authored by Christopher Chen, ISBN 9781905740628
- Recurrent Pregnancy Loss – ECAB (2009) Elsevier Health Sciences, ISBN 8131232255
