= Victoria Girls Higher Secondary School =

School in Tamil Nadu, India

Coordinates: 8.806212°N 78.145843°E

Victoria Girls School, established by Queen Victoria, provides education in both Tamil and English languages. It's a centenary school provided with well-equipped lab facilities. The school is well known for its discipline. It has been ranked in top ten schools in Tuticorin District.
