= St Ebba's School =

School in Chennai, India

St Ebba's School also known as St. Ebba's Girls' Higher Secondary School is located in DR Radhakrishnan Salai, Chennai, India .It was founded in 1886.
