= Kalimpong Girls' High School =

Location
- K.D. Pradhan Road, Opposite McFarlane Memorial Church; Kalimpong, West Bengal; India; 27.0699606°N 88.4703903°E

Information
- Type: Educational institution
- Motto: "Satyamev Jayte"
- Established: 1890
- School district: Darjeeling
- Principal: Mrs. Sulemin Sompu Pradhan
- Affiliation: WBCHSE
- Website: www.ghskpg.com

Kalimpong Girls' High School is an all girls' school, affiliated under the West Bengal Council of Higher Secondary Examination boarding school located in the hill town of Kalimpong in the district of Darjeeling, West Bengal, India. It was founded in 1890. GHS (as it is commonly referred to), is run under the Diocese of the Eastern Himalayas (C.N.I).

Kalimpong Girls' High School is affiliated to the WBCHSE Board, West Bengal, and is listed at index number 28 of the Higher Secondary Schools in Darjeeling District. KGHS offers the streams, Arts, Commerce & Science at the Higher Secondary Level. It provides education from classes nursery to XII with boarding facilities.

== History ==
Kalimpong Girls' High School was established in 1890, and is one of the oldest schools of Kalimpong. It is affiliated to the West Bengal Council of Secondary Education. The List of The Principals are:

1. Miss Catherine Graham – Founder
2. Miss Lily Waugh 1889
3. Miss Eddie Smith 1909–1933
4. Miss C. Macintosh 1933–1947
5. Miss H. Hebbington 1948–1954
6. Miss E.S Scrim Guer 1955–1966
7. Miss L.W Rongong 1967–1996
8. Mrs. Sulemin Sompu Pradhan 1998 – present

== See also ==
- Education in India
- List of schools in India
- Education in West Bengal
