= Anupshahr =

- City
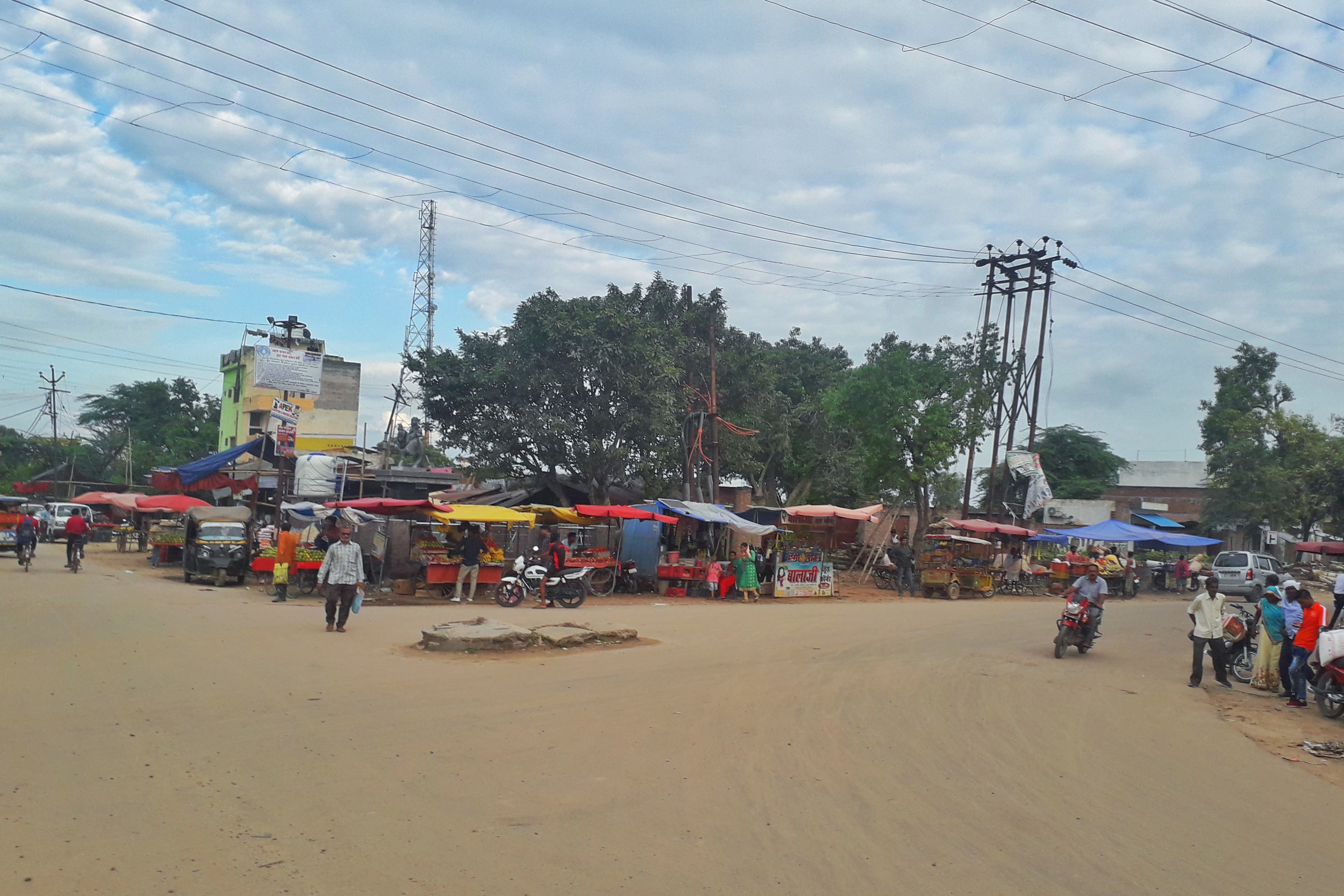
- Anupshahar Chauraha in Bulandshahr district, U.P

- Location in Uttar Pradesh, India
- Coordinates: 28.37°N 78.27°E
- Country: India
- State: Uttar Pradesh
- District: Bulandshahr
- Founder: Anup Rai (The hero)

Government
  - Mayor: Brijesh goyal

Area
  - Total: 15 km^{2} (5.8 sq mi)
- Elevation: 182 m (597 ft)

Population (2001)
  - Total: 23,676
  - Density: 1,600/km^{2} (4,100/sq mi)

Languages
  - Official: Hindi
  - Local dialect: Khadi Boli
- Time zone: UTC+5:30 (IST)
- PIN: 203390

Anupshahr is a city and a municipal board, near Bulandshahr city in Bulandshahr district in the state of Uttar Pradesh, India. It is located on the right bank of the holy river Ganga. It is on a Bangar area.

== Geography ==
Anupshahr is located at 28.37°N 78.27°E. It has an average elevation of 182 metres (597 ft). It is located near holy river Ganga. It is located on Bangar Alluvial.

== Demographics ==
As of the 2001 India census, males constitute 53% of the population and females 47%. Anupshahr has an average literacy rate of 57%, lower than the national average of 59.5%; with 59% of the males and 41% of females literate. 15% of the population is under 6 years of age.

== History ==
According to the Imperial Gazetteer of India the founder of Anupshahr was the bargujar clan of Rajput Raja named Anup Singh Badgujar, and thus the date of foundation of present-day Anupshahr was between 1605 and 1628 (during the reign of the Moghul emperor Jahangir). Raja Anup Singh Badgujar saved Jahangir during a lion hunt, by intercepting and then helping to kill a lion that attacked the emperor. Jahangir presented this area to Raja Anup Singh Badgujar, and the city is named after him. Anup Singh Badgujar built a fort nearby.

During the period of King Tarasingh (the eighth generation from Raja Anup Singh) this area progressed much. At that time the area was known for Ayurvedic medicine specially pandey clan vaidyas which was blessed by Ashwatthama and for business by boats in northern India.

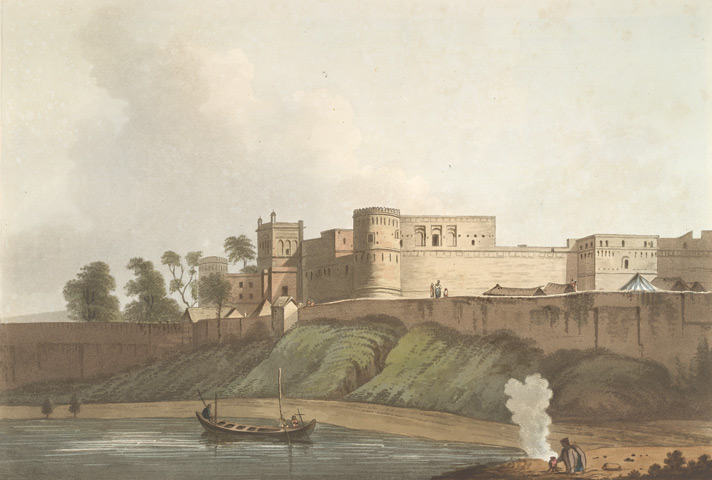
Anchshur, A Nabob's Castle in the Territory of Bengal, drawn by Francis Swain Ward, bef. 1802

In the 18th century when the Mughal empire set into a decline and the former satraps attained the status of suzerain rulers Anupshahr came to be located on the western periphery of the 'Nawabi' of Oudh (Avadh) and became an important garrison. Though the Nawab of Oudh soon lost control of the area, this small town long remained a cantonment of sorts.

In 1857, during the first war of independence the town of Anupshahr was the scene of incidents against British rule. One message of revolution was carried from Aligarh to Bulandshahr by Pandit Narayan Sharma on 10 May 1857. The Lord of Dadri and Sikandrabad destroyed inspection bungalows, telegraph offices and government buildings as they were symbols of foreign rule. Following recapture of Delhi by the Army of the East India Company and the subsequent assumption of direct responsibility for administering India by the British Crown the first Viceroy, Lord Canning on his march to Delhi camped at Anupshahr with his Army. (As per John Beames, "Memoirs of a Bengal civilian".

== Facilities ==
Anupshahr is also known as Chotti Kashi ("Little Kashi"). It is located on the banks of the holy river Ganges. Krishna Temple is an important temple in the town.

Anupshahr has adequate educational facilities, with a post graduate degree college, a CBSE affiliated 10+2 school, and six intermediate colleges. Jaypee University has been established there under UP act no.8 2014 offering undergraduate courses in five streams namely Computer Science, Electronics and Communication, Information Technology, Civil and Mechanical Engineering Courses. University also offers BSC honours, BBA, BCOM, BA Courses. The Pardada Pardadi Educational Society, based in the town, is a non-profit organisation dedicated to the academic, economic and social empowerment of girls and women. Jaypee hospital has been established in Anupshahr by Jaypee Group and it provides best healthcare facilities. There are many ghats near river Ganga and people from far away come here to bathe in river Ganga on festivals.
