= St. Joseph's Anglo-Indian Higher Secondary School =

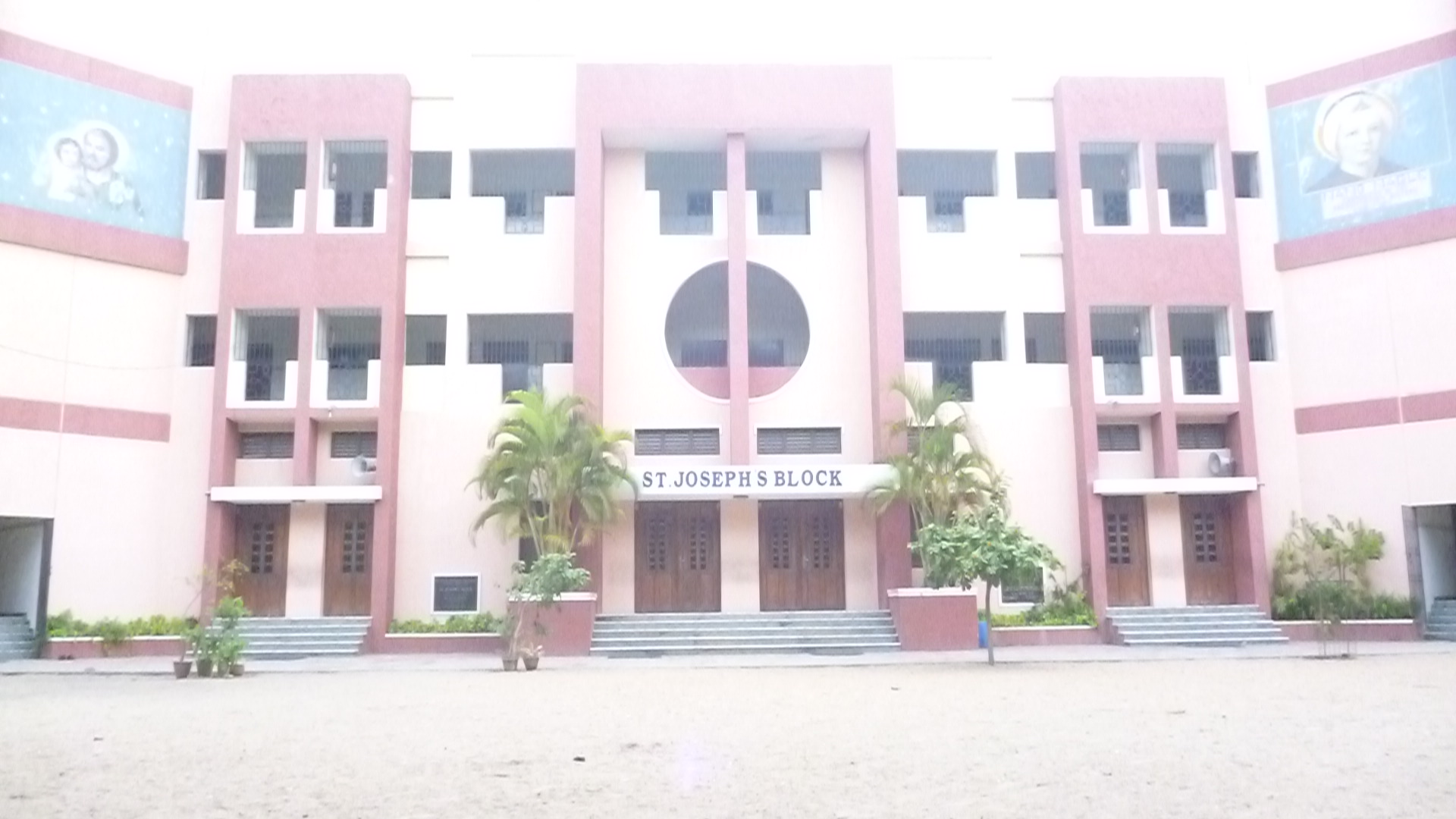

Location
- 62, Siruvallur High Road; Perambur; Chennai, Tamil Nadu, 600011; India; 13.108402°N 80.239873°E

Information
- Motto: Pro Fide et Moribus (For Faith and Morals)
- Religious affiliation: Roman Catholic
- Denomination: Non-denominational
- Patron saint: Saint Joseph
- Established: 1883
- Founder: Fr. J. Allen (SDB)
- Principal: Sr. amala jothi (PBVM)
- Grades: 12
- Enrollment: 1700 (approx.)
- Language: English
- Colours: Green and Gold
- Publication: Campus Chronicle; Extrovert
- Affiliations: Presentation Sisters
- Correspondent: Sr. Ann Teresa (PBVM)
- Former pupils: Josephites
- Website: stjosephperambur.com

St. Joseph's Anglo-Indian Higher Secondary School is an all-girls day school, located on Siruvallur High Road at Perambur in the city of Chennai that was founded in 1883 by Fr. J. Allen, initially as an attachment to ' Our Lady of Lourdes Shrine '. It is now managed by the Presentation Sisters.

== History ==
In the year 1842, the Presentation Sisters established their congregation on Indian soil. In 1883, it was found imperative to bring into being an institution to cater to the educational requirements of the children. The erstwhile Archbishop of Madras cum parish priest of the ' Shrine of Our Lady of Lourdes ', Rev. Fr. J. Allen was the first manager of the school.

In the year 1895, Fr. P. O. Carroll assumed the administrative role in collaboration with a trio of lay teachers. Recognition was granted by the Government of Tamil Nadu in the year 1903.

In 1911, the management of the institution was consigned to the Presentation Sisters under Mother Angela Curtin.

== Academics ==
The school initially educated boys up to Class IV and girls up to Class X. Following a revision of admission in 2007, the school now identified as an all-girls school. In 2011, the school was upgraded to higher secondary level, offering a total of four alternative streams:

- Computer Science, Physics, Chemistry and General Mathematics
- Biology, Physics, Chemistry and General Mathematics
- Commerce, Economics, Accountancy and Computer Science
- Commerce, Economics, Accountancy and Business Mathematics

The medium of instruction is English. The second languages incorporated in the curriculum are Tamil and French for higher secondary level and Tamil for high school. Hindi continued to be a second language alternative for high school, prior to a syllabus revision that witnessed its withdrawal. Currently, the Samacheer Kalvi (Equity Education) system is adhered to.

Public Examinations for Classes X and XII are conducted and the answer booklets are evaluated by select staff assigned by the Government of Tamil Nadu.

== Infrastructure and Facilities ==
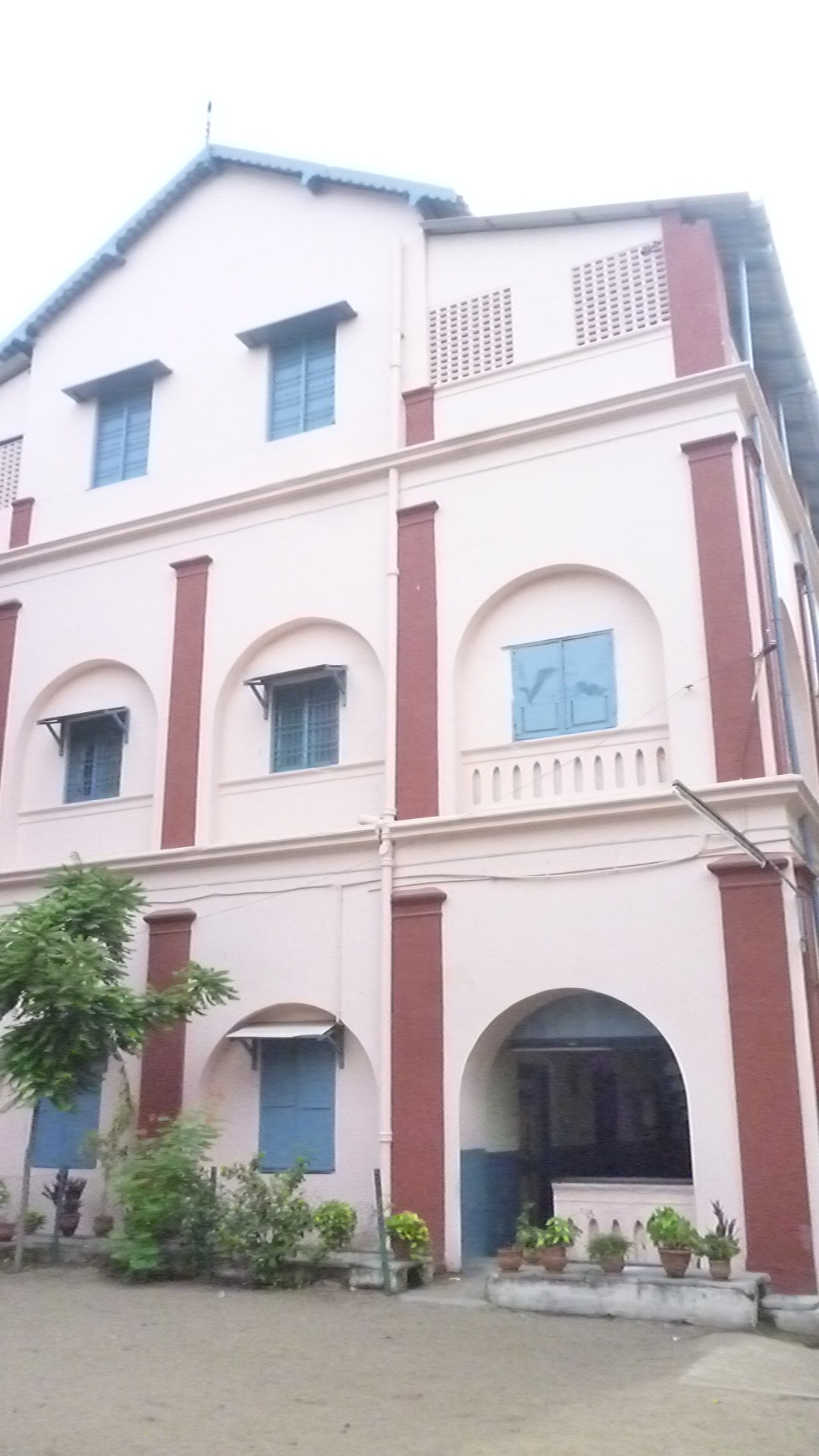
The Nagle Block

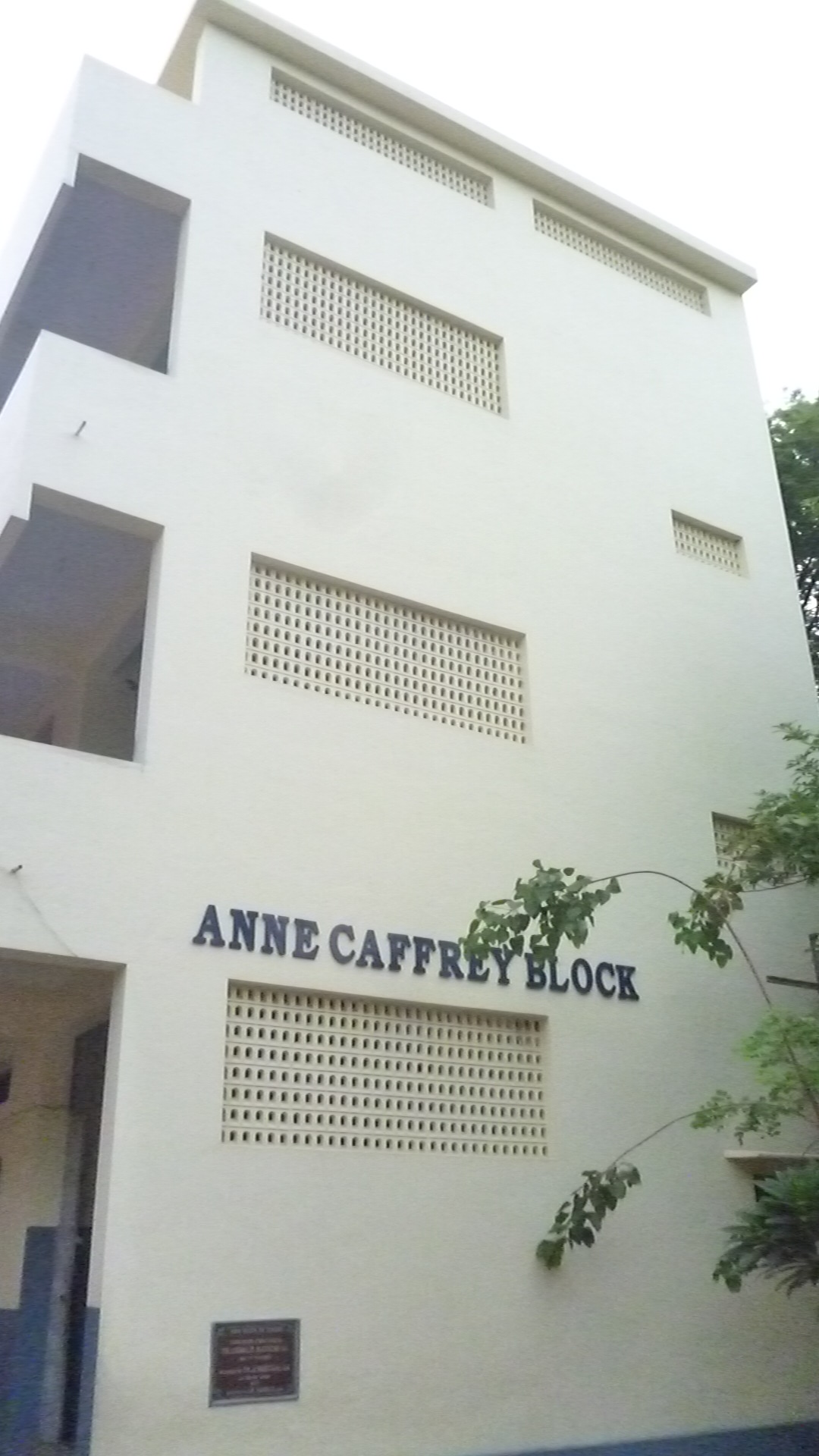
The Anne Caffrey Block

Three buildings, namely the Anne Caffrey Block, the Nagle Block and the neoteric Saint Joseph's block constitute the plan of the school. Each block is two levels high.

Amenities include an auditorium, a library, an audio-visual sector, a solar power plant, a reverse osmosis plant, two air-conditioned computer laboratories along with laboratories for physics, chemistry and biology, an assembly stage and a canteen. Two independent vehicle stands, for the teaching and supportive staff and the student body, exist.

The convent with a chapel on the zero level are on the premises. Diverse plants are bought and gifted by the students on special occasions which are maintained along with avifauna such as lovebirds, pigeons, a green parakeet and a cockerel. A couple of aquaria are maintained and a warren of rabbits is also bred.

Private and unaffiliated St. John's Nursery and Primary School is also on-campus.

== Athletics ==
The school endorses various sports such as basketball (that has seen players rise to international ranks), table tennis, karate, kabaddi, kho-kho, throwball and track and field events whose players have also bagged multiple laurels and acclaim.

The school hosts the Nano Nagle Interschool Basketball Tournament annually, effective since 2010, and also an annual Table Tennis Tournament since 2014.

There is an outdoor basketball court and an indoor table tennis court.

A day in the scholastic year is allotted for the manifestation of sportsmanship and the pertaining events of sport are conducted in the neighboring Railway Stadium.

== Activities ==
Weekly, the high school students assort themselves into their respective clubs, all of which endeavor to promote their all-round development. The functional clubs of the school include:

- Art and Craft Club
- Marching band
- Girl Guides
- Children's Rights Club
- English Literature Club
- Environment Club
- Music Club
- Nagle Club
- Needlework Club
- Red Ribbon Club (RRC)
- Road Safety Patrol (RSP)
- Tamil Literature Club
- Young Students' Movement (YSM)
- Bharata Natyam

Aside from the aforementioned activities, the pupils are assigned projects and are encouraged to partake in the annual dramatics, carol-singing contests, occasional debates, creative writing, elocutions and a variety of similar external competitions.

== Faith Formation ==
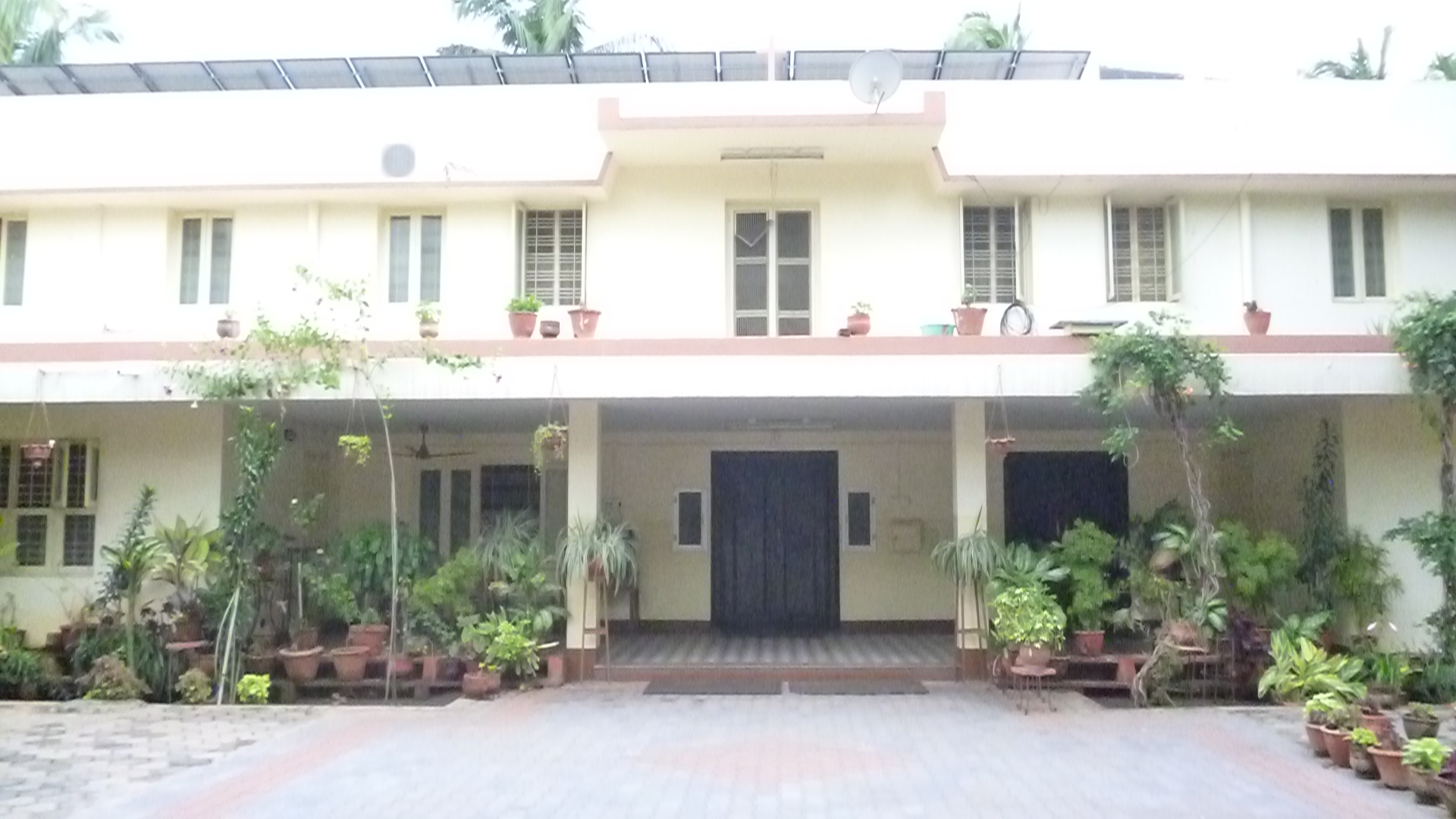
Frontal view of the convent

Thrice a week, a time slot is given to religious instruction- Catechism for Roman Catholics along with voluntary Christians of other denominations and Values education for non-Christians. The text material for Catechism is issued by the Archdiocese of Madras and Mylapore wherein the Catechism examination evaluations are carried out.

Holy Mass is attended by the sisters, Catholic teachers, high school and higher secondary students every first Friday of the month and on special occasions. Masses are animated by the Catechism students of a particular class each month in combination with the Catechism teacher(s) concerned. The chapel affixed to the convent is open to the sisters, the staff, and the students during school hours.

Retreats are orchestrated over a period of two or three months for both students and teachers.

== Notable alumni ==
- Andrea Jeremiah, actress, playback singer, musician and dancer
