= Anupshahar =

- Village
- Anupshahar
- Location in Rajasthan, India Anupshahar (India)
- Coordinates: 28°57′19″N 75°12′36″E
- Country: India
- State: Rajasthan
- District: Hanumangarh
- Founder: Maharaja Anup Singh (Ruler of Bikaner)

Government
  - Type: Democratic
  - Sarpanch: Sarwan Singh Rathore
- Elevation: 201 m (659 ft)

Languages
  - Official: Hindi
  - Regional: Bagri and Haryanvi, Rajasthani
- Time zone: UTC+5:30 (IST)
- PIN: 335501
- Telephone code: 911504
- Vehicle registration: RJ- 49

Anupshahr is a major village located in Bhadra, Rajasthan tehsil, Hanumangarh District, India. It belongs to Bikaner division. It is popular as name "Nopra". It is an Historical village located some 24 km south-west of Bhadra and around 134 km off to Hanumangarh.It also located at border of Hanumangarh District. Anupshahr can be reached from Anupshahr, the nearest railway station. It is 50 km off National Highway NH-52 and 285 km from State capital Jaipur. It is 230 km from national capital New Delhi

== Banks ==
There are several nationalized, scheduled, and rural banks in the city.

Rajasthan Gramin Bank..

== Demographics ==
Demographic Distribution of Religion in Anupshahr, Rajasthan
Caste	Percent(%)
General	49.50%
OBC	28.71%
SC	12.43%
ST	9.36%

According to 2026 Census of India, Anupshahar Town had a population of 5100+, of which male and female are 2570 and 2510 respectively. The sex ratio was 950 and 14.17% were under six years of age. The effective literacy rate was 69.26%, with male literacy at 79.29% and female literacy at 58.71%.

== Education ==
The village has One Government Higher Secondary School for boys and girls, one Government Primary School. There are also a number of Non-Government Schools for Middle, and Secondary Education.

- Govt. Sr. Secondary School, Anupshahar
- Mahatma Gandhi Government school, Anupshahar (Girls)
- Govt. Sanskrit School, Anupshahar
- Shri Shyam School, Anupshahar
- S.D. Model Sr. Sec. School And College (Girls) Anupshahar
- Sarswati Vidhya Mandir School, Anupshahar
