= Spectrum Mall (Chennai) =

Building in India

Coordinates: 13.112312°N 80.236268°E

Spectrum Mall (formerly known as Grand Venus Mall) is a shopping mall located in Perambur, Chennai, India. It is the first mall in North Chennai. The mall was developed at the site of erstwhile Venus theater on Paper Mills Road in Perambur. The mall is spread over an area of 160,000 square feet with two levels of retail shopping and a five screen multiplex. It has two levels of basement parking with capacity of 200 cars and 800 two wheelers. The mall is developed and promoted by Ganga Foundations. The mall has Big Bazaar as its anchor store The mall was soft launched in September 2011 as Grand Venus Mall. It was rebranded as Spectrum mall and was officially launched in September 2012 along with its PVR Cinemas multiplex.
