= Perambur =

- Neighbourhood
- Perambur (Chennai) Perambur (Tamil Nadu) Perambur (India)
- Coordinates: 13°07′15.6″N 80°13′57.4″E
- Country: India
- State: Tamil Nadu
- District: Chennai district
- Metro: Chennai
- Elevation: 54 m (177 ft)

Languages
  - Official: Tamil
- Time zone: UTC+5:30 (IST)
- PIN: 600011
- Vehicle registration: TN-05
- Municipal body: Chennai Corporation
- Ward Nos.: 51, 52, 53
- LS constituency: Chennai North
- VS constituency: Perambur
- MP: Dr. Kalanidhi Veeraswamy, DMK
- MLA: C. Joseph Vijay, TVK
- Website: chennaicorporation.gov.in

Perambur is a neighbourhood in the northern region of Chennai, Tamil Nadu, India.

== Etymology ==
In Tamil, pirambu (பிரம்பு) means bamboo, and oor (ஊர்) means city or place. Before British rule, this place was as a bamboo forest, particularly around the Huzur Gardens area, which currently houses the Simpsons Pvt. Ltd. The area was annexed to Chennai in 1742.

== Location ==
Perambur has an altitude of 10 m above mean sea level.

== Transportation ==
=== Road transport ===
This neighbourhood is connected to Chennai via bus services operated by the Metropolitan Transport Corporation. Its proximity to the Chennai Central railway station makes it a central transport hub.

=== Railway transport ===
Perambur has a railway station in the Indian Railways network. It is home to the Integral Coach Factory, where Vande Bharat Express trains are produced, and houses the Chennai Rail Museum. The Perambur railway station helps reduce congestion at the Chennai Central railway station. It is the second oldest railway station in the city, following Royapuram.

Perambur is served by three railway stations: Perambur railway station, Perambur Carriage Works railway station and Perambur Loco Works railway station. Perambur railway station is a major railway hub in Chennai as express and superfast trains stop there. It is the fifth largest station in Chennai by passenger volume, after Chennai Central, Chennai Egmore railway station, Tambaram and Mambalam.

== Education ==
Local schools include Railway Mixed Higher Secondary School and St. Joseph's Anglo-Indian Higher Secondary School.

== Healthcare ==
Medical facilities in Perambur include:

- Sen Hospital
- Cure Advanced Dental Care
- Southern Railway Headquarters Hospital
- Jupiter Surgical Specialty Centre
- Abhijay Hospital
- A. C. Aruldoss Hospital
- Srinivas Priya Hospital
- Aishwarya Hospital (child care)
- Iyappa Diabetes Hospital
- Vigneshwara Eye Hospital
- Apple Hospital

== Entertainment ==
Perambur has the first shopping mall in north Chennai, Spectrum Mall. It has a five-screen multiplex, named S2 Cinemas, controlled by theatre franchise PVR INOX. Perambur has other cinema theatres, such as Ganga Cinemas in Kolathur, which is 5 km away. The neighbourhood has several parks and a stadium.

== Religion ==
There are Hindu temples, a Buddhist temple, mosques and churches in the area. The Catholic church, Our Lady of Lourdes Shrine, is located near Perambur railway station and Perambur Flyover Park.

== Gallery ==
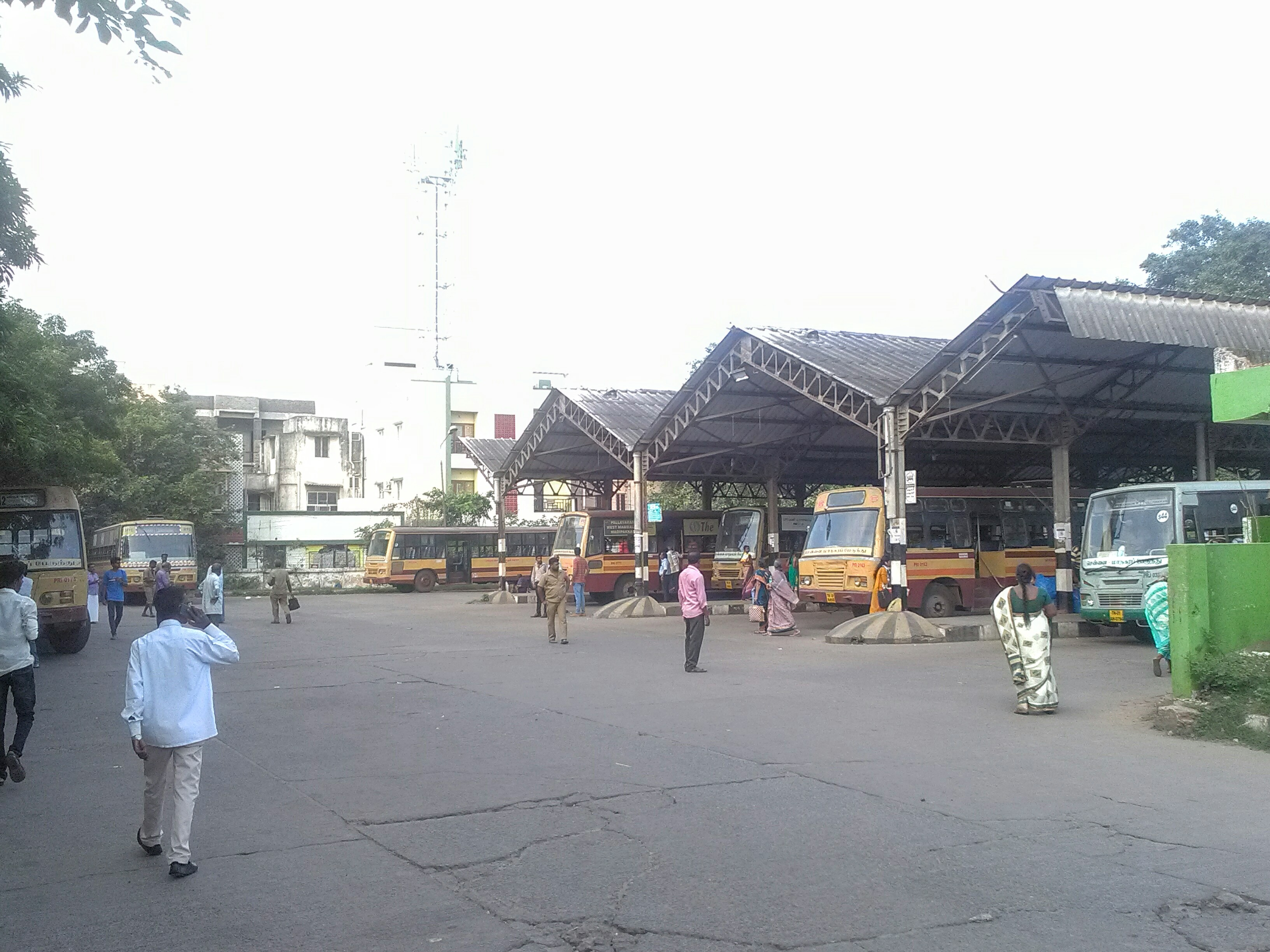
Perambur bus stand

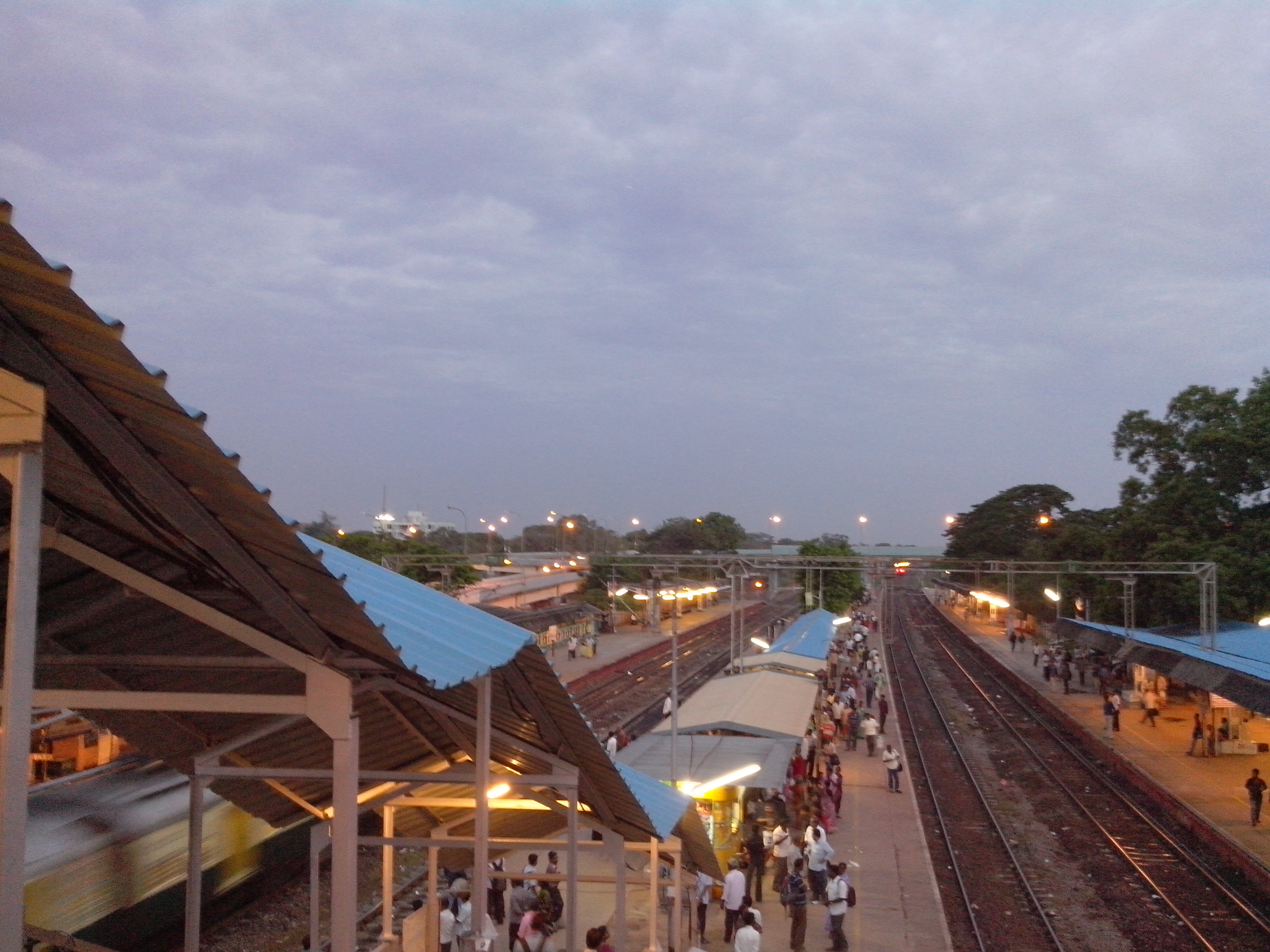
Perambur Railway Station (view) Perambur Flyover

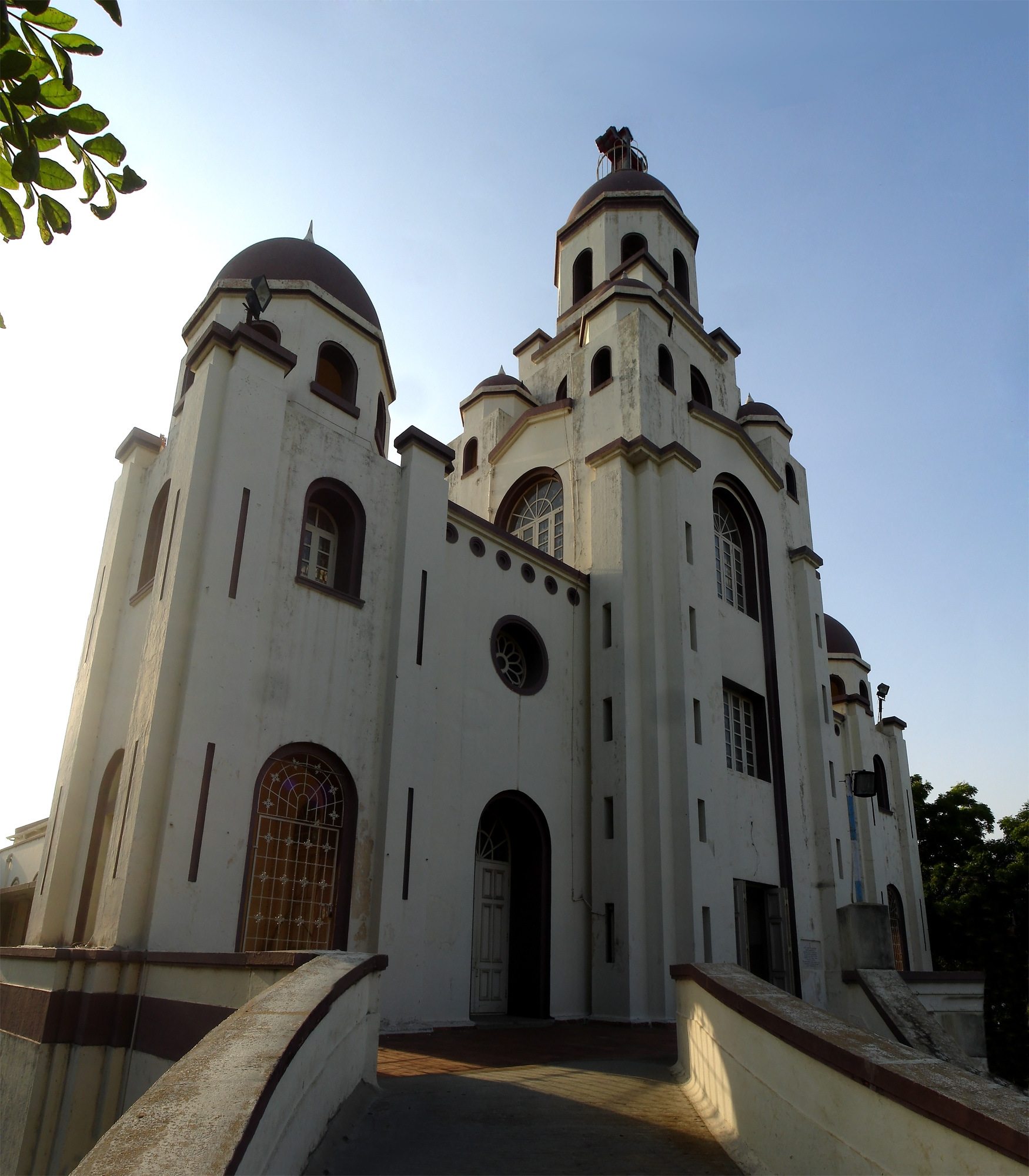
The Our Lady of Lourdes Catholic Church in Perambur

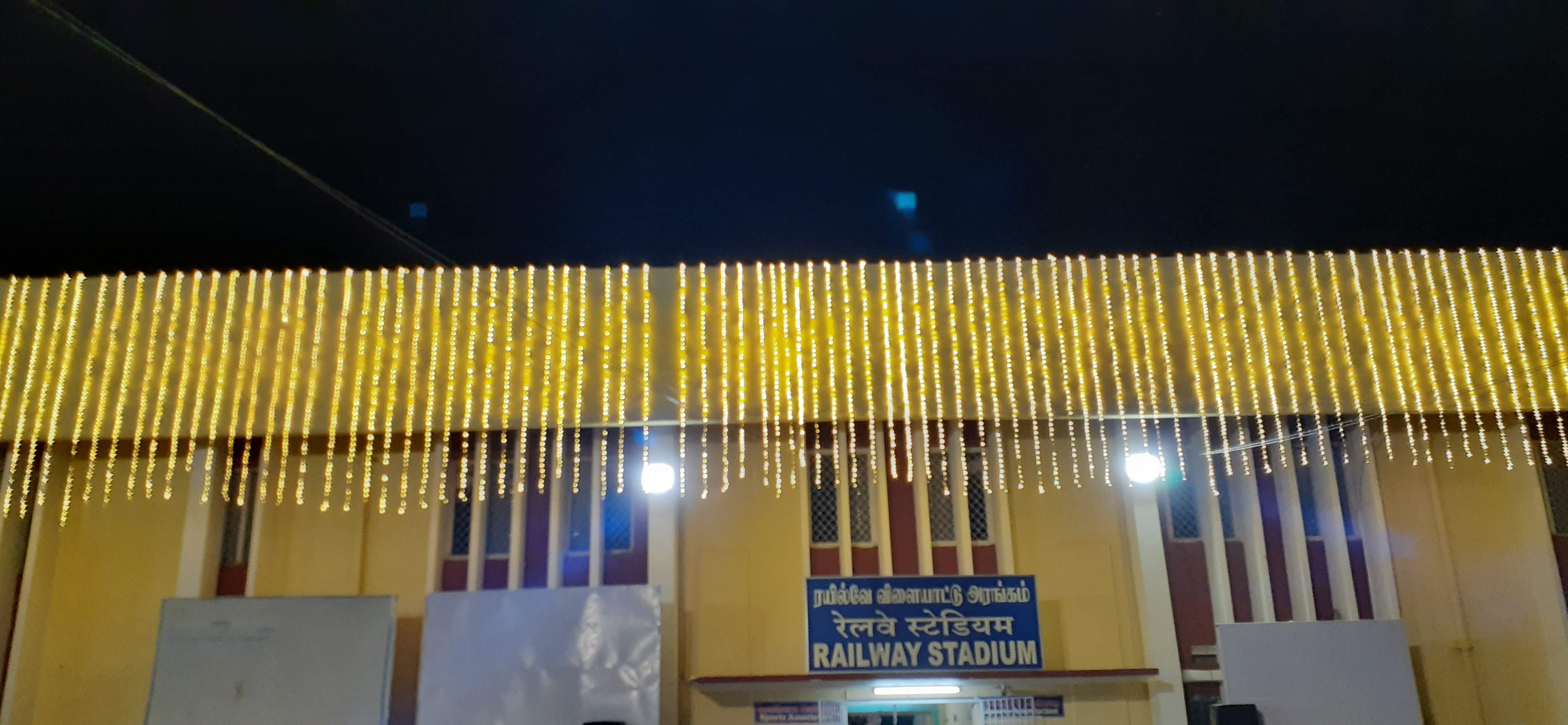
Railway Stadium, Southern Railways, Perambur, Chennai, Tamil Nadu, India

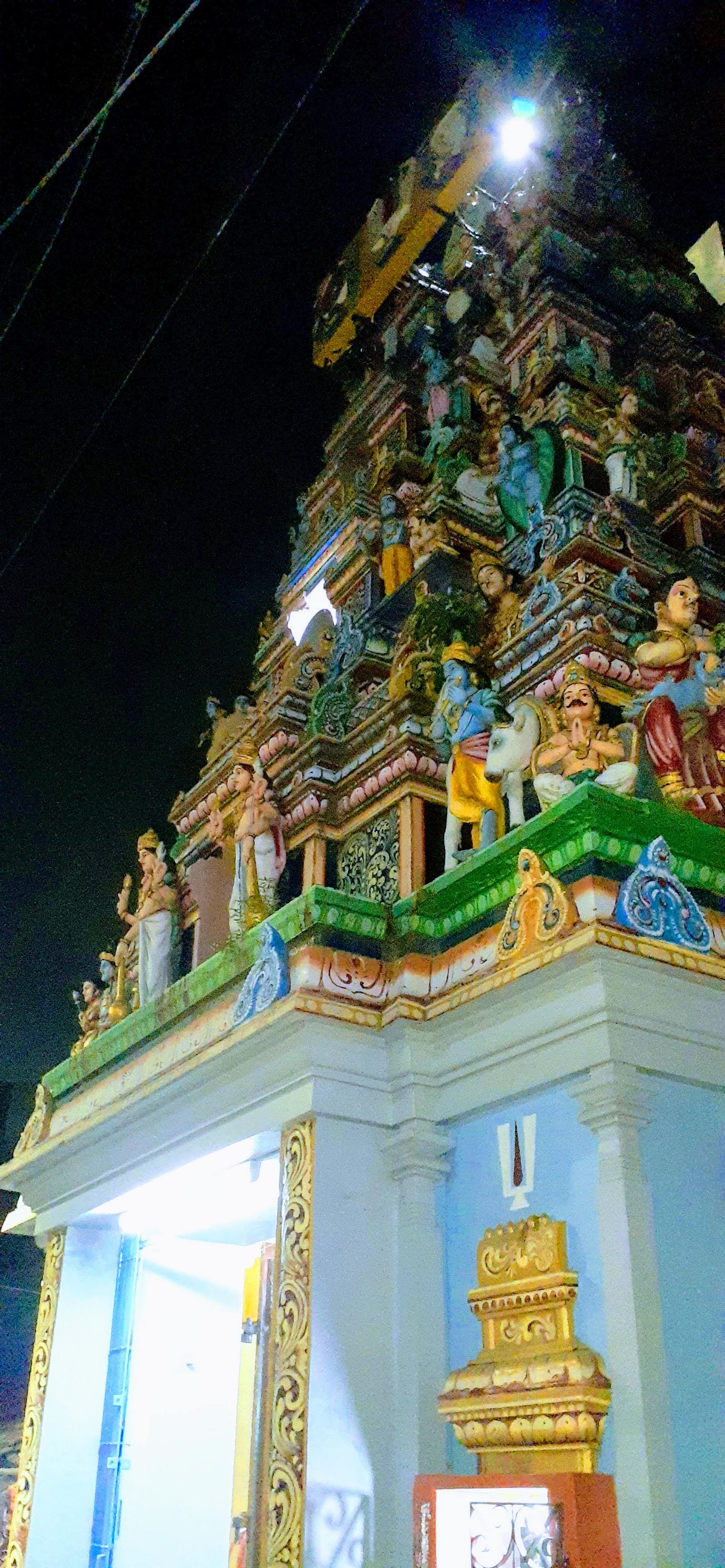
Shri. Venugopalaswamy Temple, Bunder Garden, in Perambur, in Chennai, Tamil Nadu, India

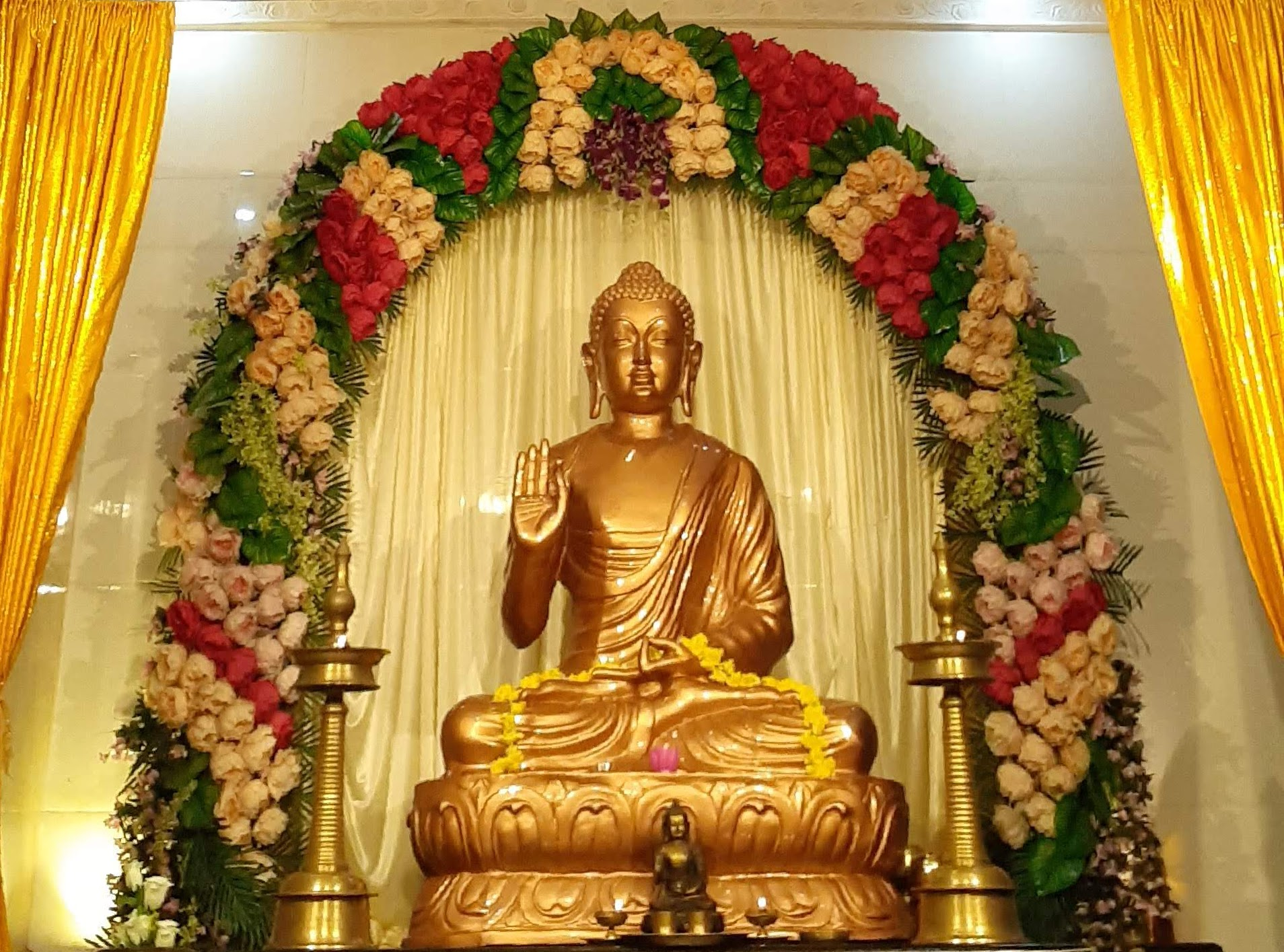
Statue of Buddha, Buddhist temple, Chennai, Tamil Nadu, India

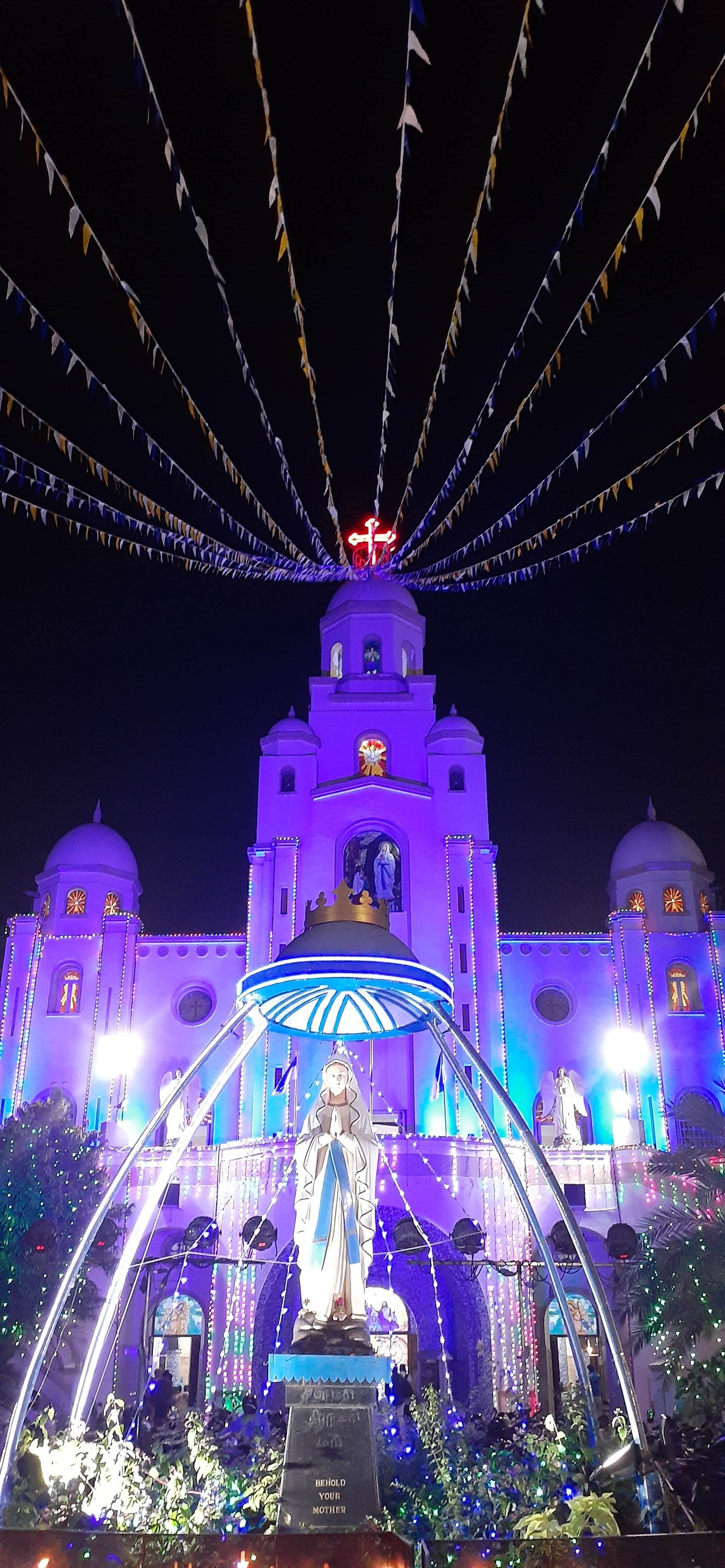
During the annual feast celebrations, flooded with lights; 'Our Lady of Lourdes Shrine', Perambur, Chennai, Tamil Nadu, India

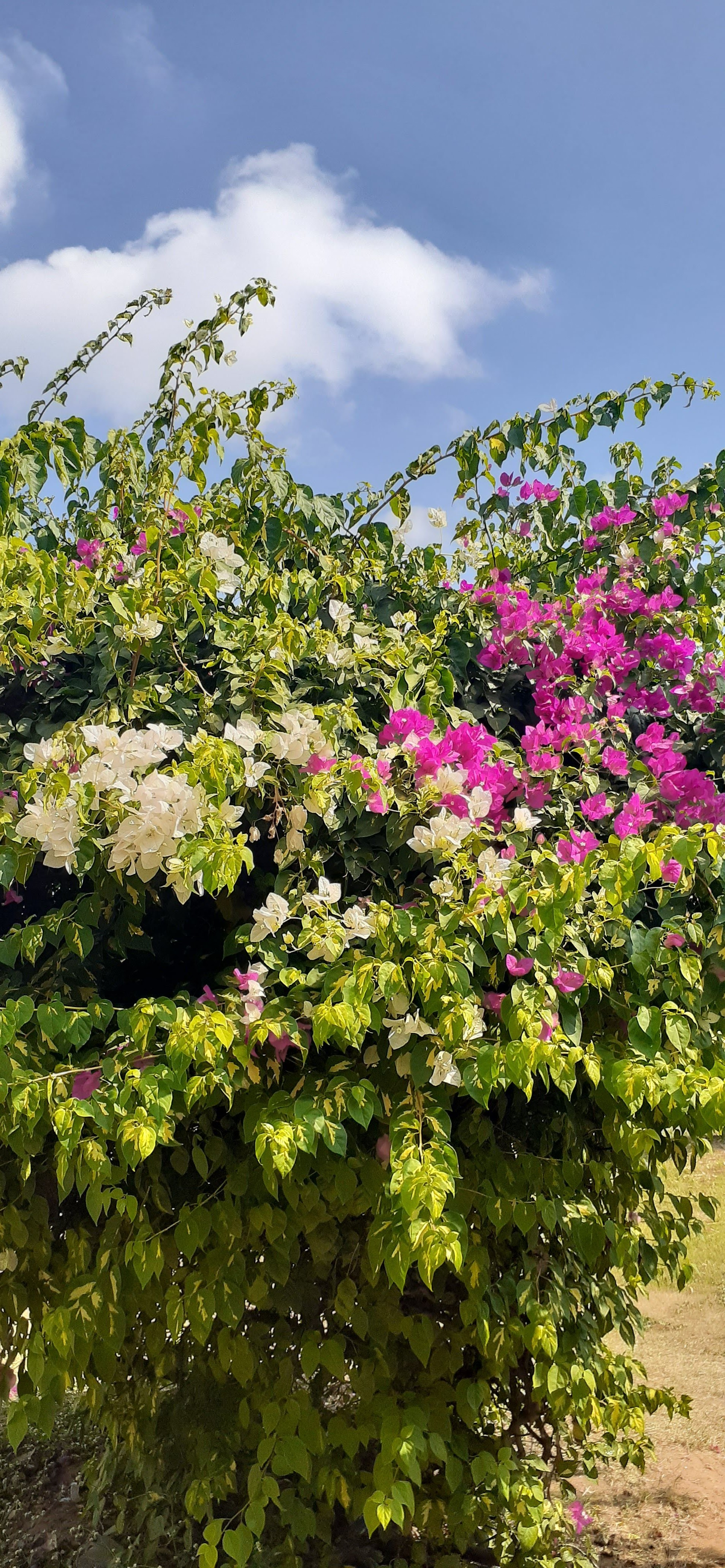
Beauty at Murasoli Maran Park, Perambur

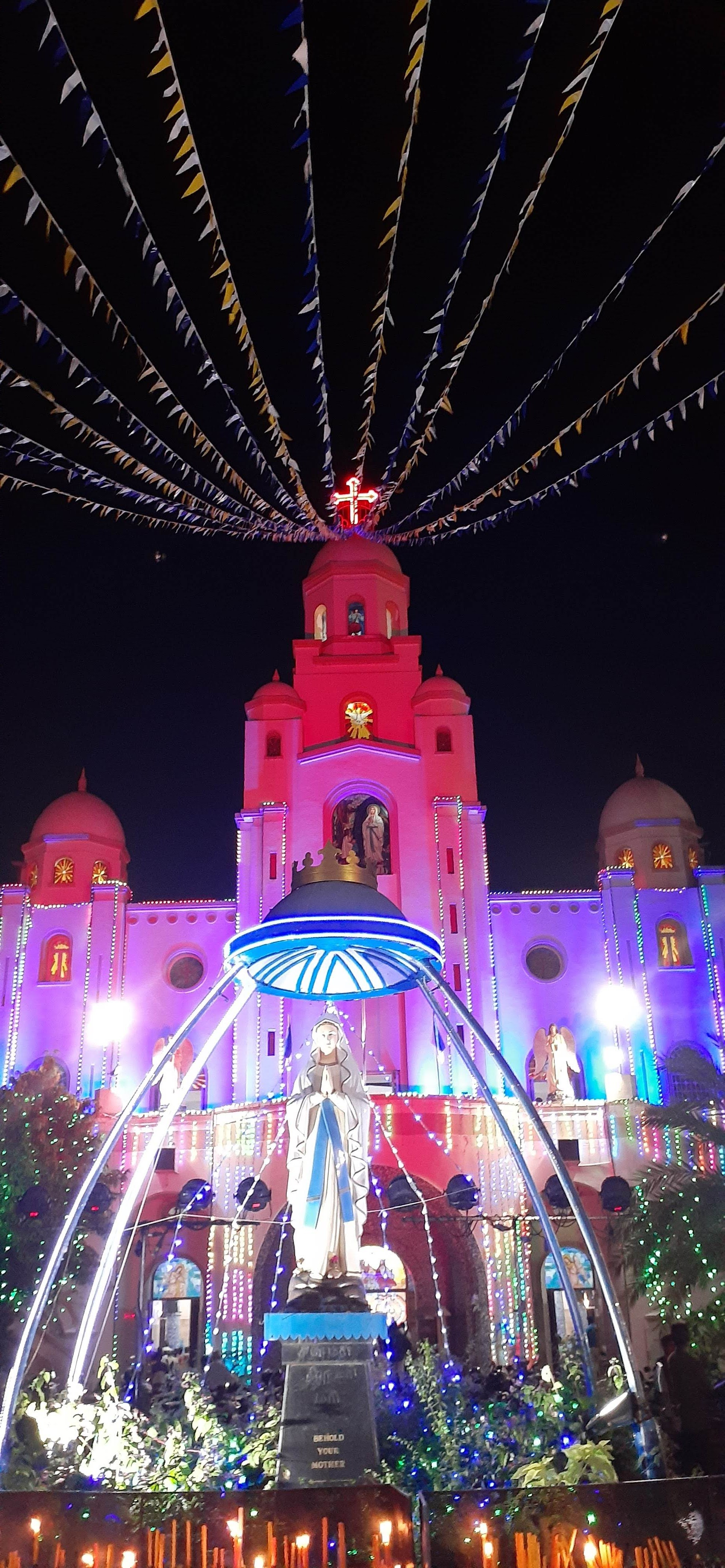
'Our Lady of Lourdes Shrine', Perambur, Chennai, Tamil Nadu, India

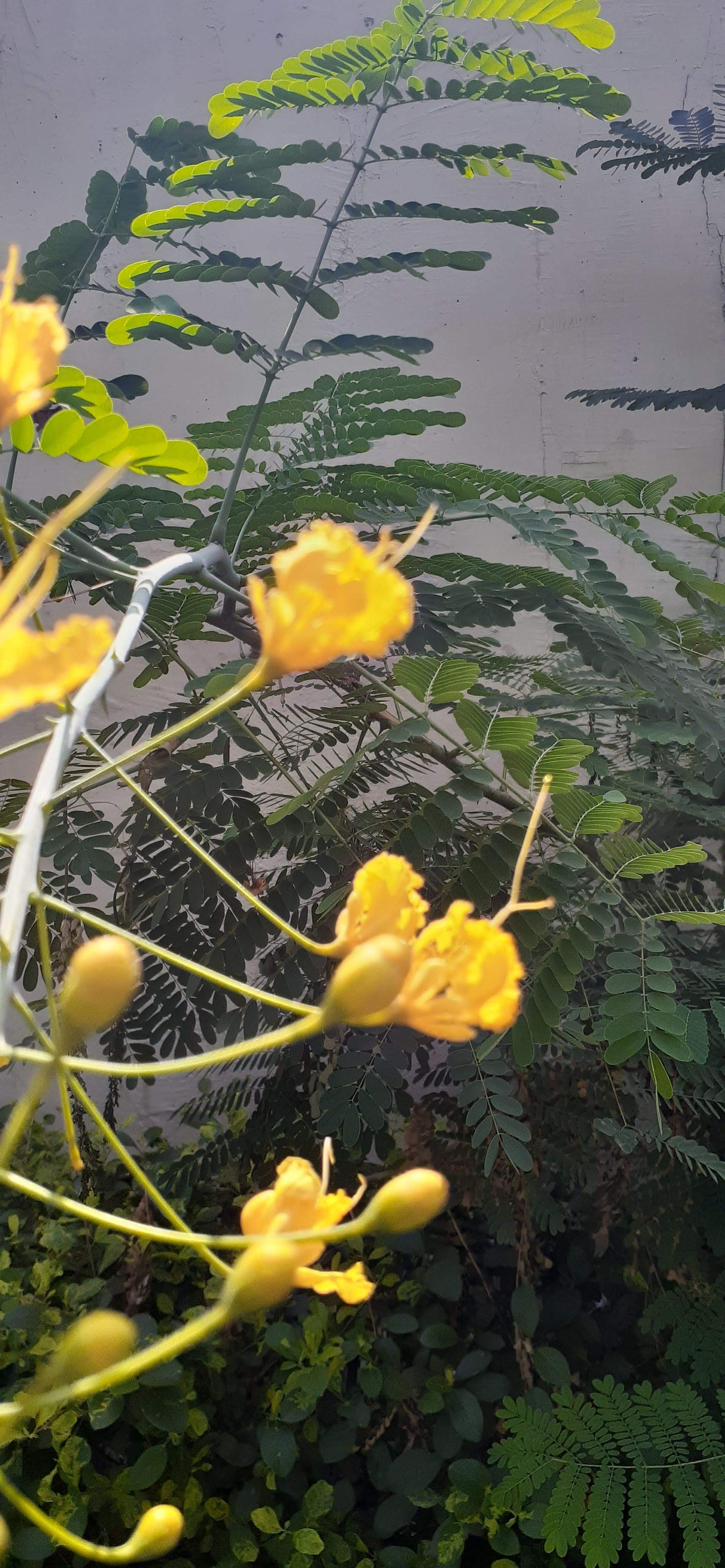
Enchanting Murasoli Maran Park, Perambur

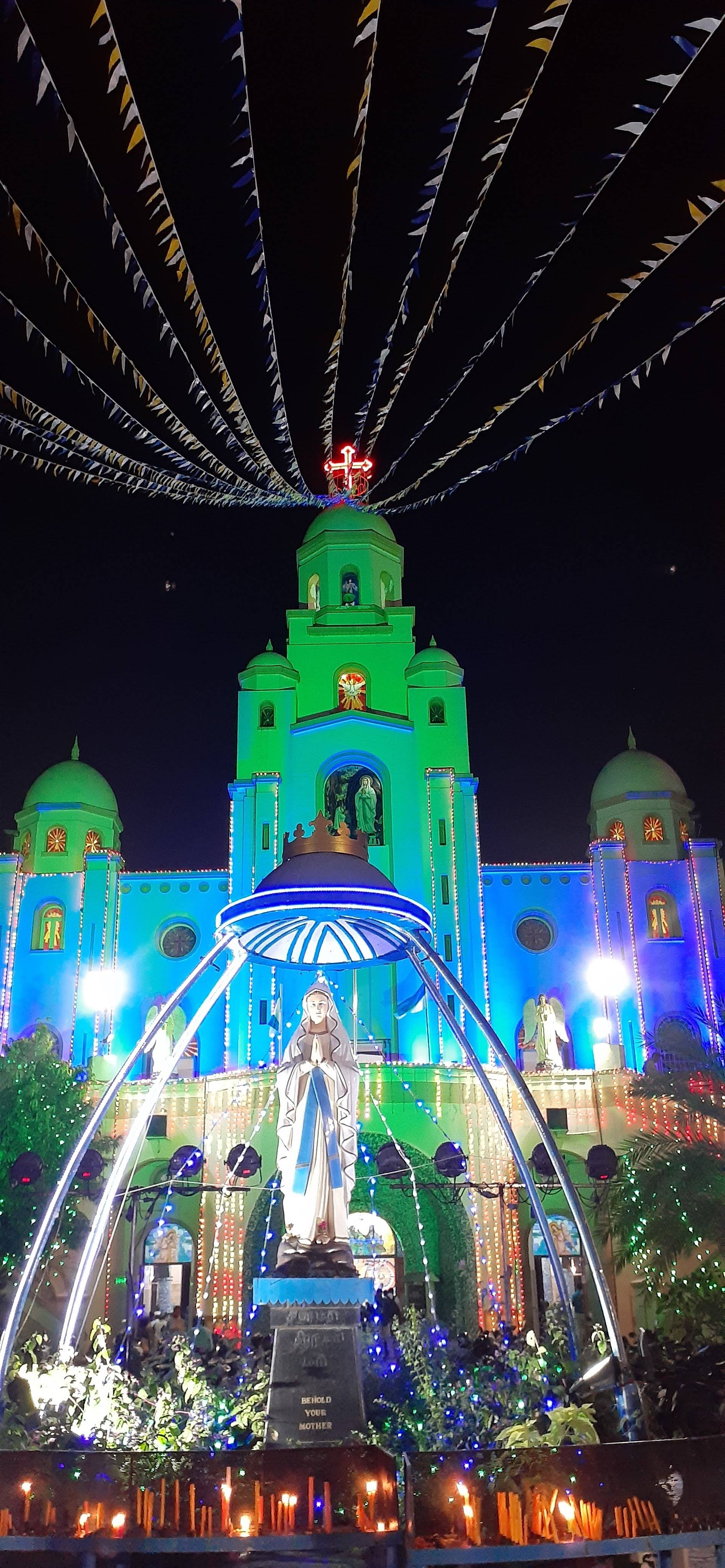
120 year old 'Our Lady of Lourdes Shrine', Perambur, Chennai, Tamil Nadu, India

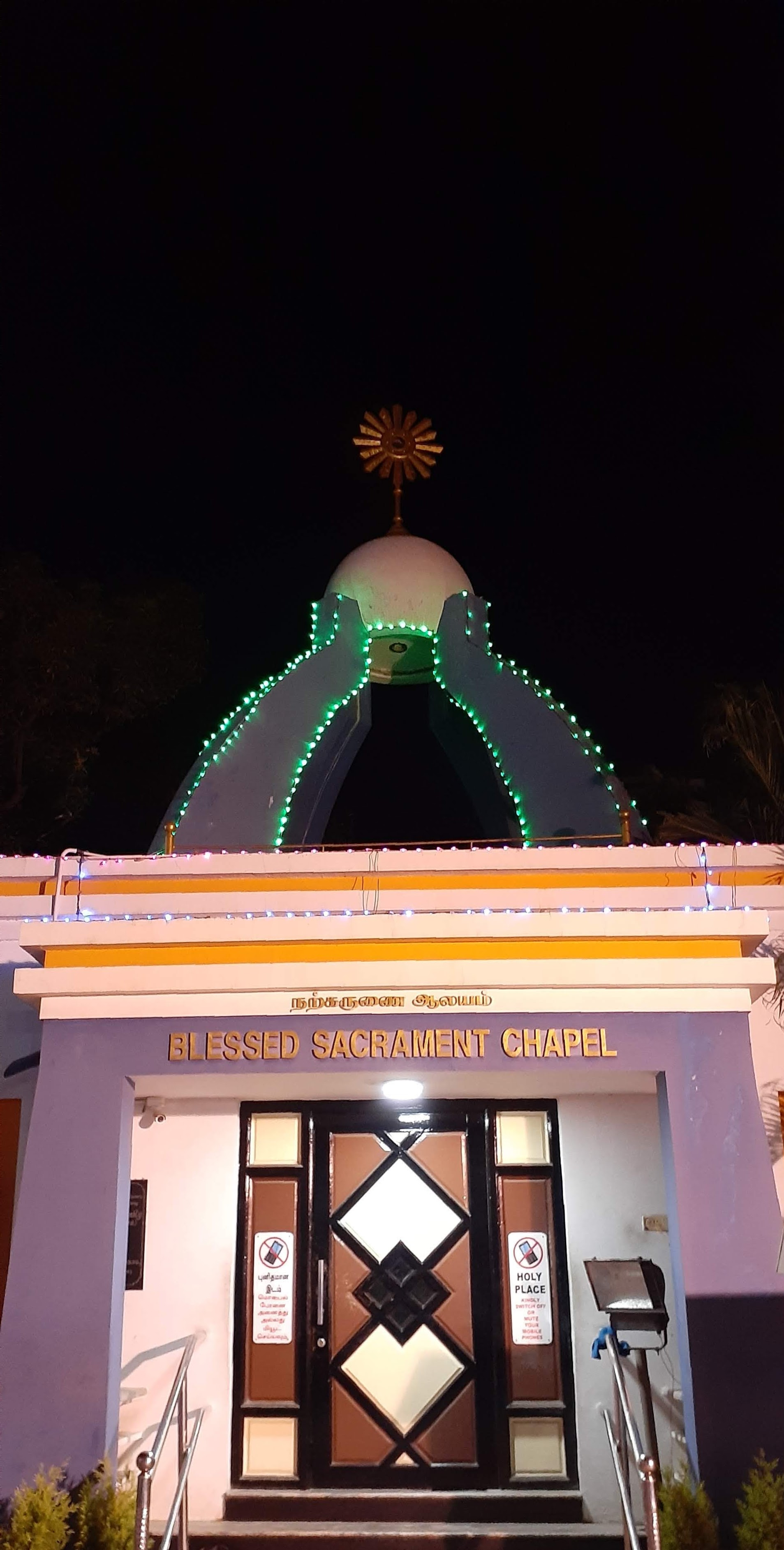
at Our Lady of Lourdes Shrine, Perambur

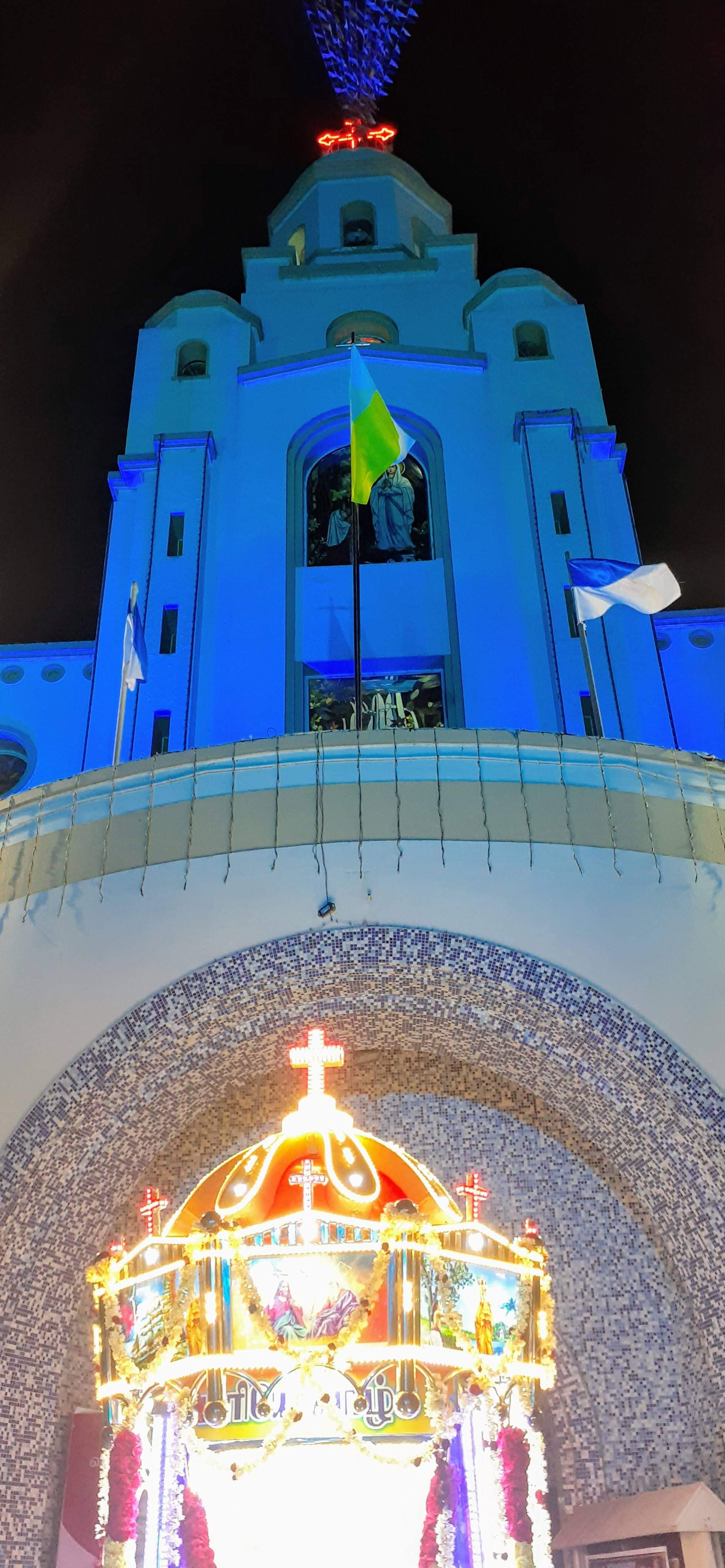
Annual Feast celebrations at Our Lady of Lourdes Shrine Chennai Tamil Nadu

== Notes ==
- National Informatics Centre (10 November 2020). "History, Chennai District, India". Ministry of Electronics & Information Technology, Government of India.
- Kamath, Rina (2000). Chennai (Second ed.). Chennai: Orient Longman Limited. p. 250. ISBN 81-250-1378-4.
- The Universal Directory of Railway Officials (1919). The Universal Directory of Railway Officials. Vol. 25. p. 239.
- India: Railway Board (1924). Classified List of Gazetted Establishment of Indian Railways. Manager of Publication. p. 198.
