= List of educational institutions in Coimbatore =

The following is a list of educational institutions in Coimbatore.

== Schools ==
=== CBSE ===
- National Model Senior Secondary School
- SSVM Institutions – A group of private schools in Coimbatore offering CBSE, Cambridge IGCSE, IB, and NIOS curricula. Established in 1998.
- VIBGYOR High School, Coimbatore
- Alchemy Public School
- Air Force School
- Benglen Public Senior Secondary School
- Noyyal Public School
- PSG Public Schools
- Suguna PIP School
- The NGP School
- Yuvabharathi Public School
- Delhi Public Schools, Coimbatore campus
- Rathinam International Public School
- The Indian Public School
- Velammal Bodhi Campus
- Samashti International School
- Amrita Vidyalayam, Ettimadai
- Amrita Vidyalayam, Kalapatti
- Amrita Vidyalayam, Nallampalyam
- Chinmaya International Residential School, Siruvani

=== ICSE ===
- National Model Quantum Leap Academy
- Stanes Anglo Indian Higher Secondary School

=== Government Aided ===
- CSI Boys Higher Secondary School
- Stanes Anglo Indian Higher Secondary School
- T.A.Ramalingam Chettiar Higher Secondary School
- ST.MICHAELS HIGHER SECONDARY SCHOOL

=== Private ===
- Alvernia Matriculation Higher Secondary School
- Carmel Garden Matriculation Higher Secondary School
- GRG Matriculation Higher Secondary School
- Infant Jesus Matriculation Higher Secondary School
- Islamiyah Matriculation Higher Secondary School
- Laurel Matric Hr Sec School
- Lisieux Matriculation Higher Secondary School
- Nirmala Matha Convent Matriculation Higher Secondary School
- Perks Matriculation Higher Secondary School
- PMG Matric Higher Secondary School
- Sowdeshwari Vidyalaya
- Sri Narayana Matric Higher Secondary School
- St. Joseph's Matriculation Higher Secondary School
- St Francis Anglo Indian Girls High School
- St. Paul's Matric Higher Secondary School
- Coimbatore Public School, Coimbatore (why is this listed here?)

== Colleges ==
=== Arts and Science ===
- PPG College of Arts and Science
- KPR College of Arts, Science and Research
- PSG College of Arts and Science
- CBM College of Arts and Science
- Dr.N.G.P.Arts and science college
- Government Arts College
- Hindusthan College of Arts and Science
- JCT College of Arts and Science
- KG College of Arts and Science
- Nirmala College for Women
- Sankara College of Science and Commerce
- Shri Nehru Maha Vidyalaya College of Arts and Science
- Sri Krishna Arts and Science College
- Sri Ramakrishna College of Arts and Science for Women
- Sri Ramakrishna Mission Vidyalaya College of Arts And Science
- Sree Narayana Guru College
- AJK College of Arts and Science
- Rathinam College of Arts and Science
- Kumaraguru College of Liberal Arts & Science

=== Engineering ===
- Dhaanish Ahmed Institute of Technology (Dhaanish iTech)
- KPR Institute of Engineering and Technology
- Hindusthan College of Engineering and Technology (HiCET)
- PSG College of Technology
- Adithya Institute of Technology
- Amrita School of Engineering
- Coimbatore Institute of Technology
- Coimbatore Institute of Engineering and Technology
- Dr.N.G.P.Institute of technology
- Government College of Technology
- Hindusthan Institute of Technology
- Info Institute of Engineering
- Kathir College of Engineering
- Kalaignar Karunanidhi Institute of Technology
- Karpagam College of Engineering
- Kathir College of Engineering
- KGiSL Institute of Technology
- KTVR Knowledge Park for Engineering and Technology
- Kumaraguru College of Technology
- Maharaja Institute of Technology
- PSG Institute of Technology and Applied Research
- SNS College of Engineering
- SNS College of Technology
- Sri Krishna College of Engineering & Technology
- Sri Eshwar College of Engineering
- Sri Shakthi Institute of Engineering and Technology
- Sri Ramakrishna Engineering College
- VSB College of Engineering and Technical Campus

=== Law ===
- Government Law College

=== Management ===
- Amrita School of Business
- DJ Academy of Managerial Excellence
- PPG Business School
- Jansons School of Business (JSB)
- KV Institute of Management and Information Studies
- PSG Institute of Management
- Sankara Educational Institutions

=== Military ===
- Air Force Administrative College

=== Medicine ===
- Coimbatore Medical College
- PSG Institute of Medical Sciences & Research
- PPG Institute of Optometry
- PPG College of Pharmacy
- PPG Institute of Allied Health Sciences
- PPG College of Nursing
- PPG College of Physiotherapy
- Government Medical College & ESIC hospital, formally ESIC medical college
- KMCH Medical College
- Martin Homeopathy Medical College and Hospital

=== Agriculture ===
- Agricultural Engineering College and Research Institute

=== Media ===
- Clusters Institute of media and Technology

== Universities ==
- Amrita Vishwa Vidyapeetham (AVV)
- Anna University
- Avinashilingam University
- Bharathiar University (BU)
- Karpagam University
- Karunya Institute of Tech and Sciences (KITS)
- Tamil Nadu Agricultural University (TNAU)

== Research Institutions ==
- ICAR CICR
- ICFRE IFGTB
- SACON
- South India Textile Research
- SVPISTM
- ICAR SBI
