= Ahalya Chari =

Indian educationist (1921–2013)

- Born: 1921; Rangoon, Burma
- Died: 30 March 2013 (aged 91–92); Chennai, Tamil Nadu, India
- Resting place: Chennai, Tamil Nadu, India; 28.5574°N 77.159°E
- Occupation: Educationist
- Years active: 1943–2013
- Known for: Education in India
- Awards: Padma Shri

Ahalya Chari (1921 – 30 March 2013) was an Indian educationist and the first commissioner of the Kendriya Vidyalaya chain of schools, a system of education under the Ministry of Human Resource Development (MHRD) India. Her efforts are recognised towards the establishment of Kendriya Vidyalaya Sangathan, an autonomous body under the MHRD, attending to the educational needs of the children of transferable central government employees. The Government of India awarded her the fourth highest Indian civilian honour of the Padma Shri in 1983.

== Biography ==
Ahalya Chari was born in 1921 in Rangoon, the capital of British Burma. She did her schooling at a girl's convent school run under the British curriculum and graduated from the University of Rangoon in English Literature in 1941. The Second World War forced her family to leave Burma and the family fled to Benares, stopping over at a refugee camp at Shwebo and Calcutta on the way. Settling in Benares, she did her master's degree at Benaras Hindu University and started her career in 1943 as a lecturer at the Vasanta College for Women, where she worked for 10 years.

In 1951, Chari resigned from the Vasanta College and moved to Delhi to join the Department of Education – University of Delhi, formerly known as the Central Institute of Education (CIE), as a student for advanced training in education. At this time, she received a Fulbright Scholarship for further studies in the United States where she spent two years and returned to CIE in 1953 as a member of the faculty. When the government decided to set up an apex institution for education with assistance from USAID by hiring consultants from Columbia University, Chari was delegated to the project and was involved with the establishment of the National Institute of Education (NIE) in 1961. After the establishment of the institution, she trained for one year in Applied Linguistics (1961–62) at the University of Edinburgh. On her return to India in 1962, she was appointed as the head of the textbooks department at NCERT, a job she held till 1969. During her time at NCERT, she launched a 'Reading Project' and prepared read-ready materials for inculcating reading habits in children and was instrumental in redesigning the school syllabi. When NCERT started four regional centres of education at Ajmer, Bhopal, Bhubaneswar and Regional Institute of Education (Mysore), she was appointed as the principal of the Regional Institute of Education, Mysore.

In the early 1960s, the Ministry of Human Resource Development established the Central School system and placed the chain of schools under the administration of a central office, Kendriya Vidyalaya Sangathan (KVS), with Chari as the first commissioner of the central administrative office. She worked with KVS till 1976 when she came under the influence of Jiddu Krishnamurti and joined the Indian philosopher to work at the Rajghat Education Centre in Varanasi. Her next move was to Madras (now Chennai) in 1982 as the principal of The School, one of the schools of the Krishnamurti Foundation of India (KFI). At The School, KFI, she worked against commercialisation of education and initiated projects such as implementation of the government's Right to Education Act, introduction of integrated educational programmes and initiation of the open school system.

== Later years ==
Chari continued her association with the KFI institutions and established an Alumni Forum of The School for exchange of information. She stayed a few years at the campus of the Theosophical Society in Adyar, Chennai, invited by Radha Burnier. After that she stayed in Vasant Vihar in Chennai, where the headquarters of the Krishnamurti Foundation of India is located, and served as a trustee of the foundation. She started the Journal of the Krishnamurti Schools and edited them for a number of years. She also published two books, Thinking Together, published by the National Council of Educational Research and Training in 1997 (in Hindi and English), and Selections from the Decades: On Self-Knowledge, published by KFI in 2001. She also delivered lectures including one on 'Knowledge and the Disciplines'. The Government of India awarded her the civilian honour of Padma Shri in 1983.

Chari died on 30 March 2013 at the age of 91 in Chennai, Tamil Nadu.
