= CIET =

CIET can refer to:

- The Coimbatore Institute of Engineering and Technology in Tamil Nadu, India
- The Camellia Institute of Engineering & Technology in West Bengal, India
- The Central Institute of Educational Technology in New Delhi, India
