= Pathshala (disambiguation) =

Pathshala is a South Asian Media Institute.

In Hinduism, a pathasala is a traditional religious school.

Pathshala may also refer to:

- ePathshala, an Indian online education portal
- Pathshala (novel), a Nepali novel by Tirtha Gurung
- Paathshaala, a 2010 Indian Hindi-language film
- Paathasala, a 2014 Indian Telugu-language film
- Pathsala, a town in Assam, India
- Pathsala railway station, the single railway station in Pathsala

== See also ==
- Damji Padamshi Pathshala, a Jain religious teaching institution
- Ishwar Pathshala, a school in Comilla, Bangladesh
- SK Gurukul Sangeet Pathshala, a classical music school based in Kathmandu, Nepal
- Timli Sanskrit Pathshala, a Sanskrit school in Uttarakhand, India
