= KTVR =

KTVR may refer to:

- KTVR Vijaydeepa Group, a construction & healthcare business corporate group based at Coimbatore, India
- KTVR Knowledge Park for Engineering and Technology, an engineering college (A Unit of KTVR Vijaydeepa Group) in Coimbatore, India
- KTVR Creative Reels, Film Production house (A Unit of KTVR Vijaydeepa Group), Coimbatore, India
- KTVR-FM, a radio station (90.3 FM) licensed to La Grande, Oregon, United States
- KTVR (TV), a television station (channel 13 analog/5 digital) licensed to La Grande, Oregon, United States
- Vicksburg - Tallulah Regional Airport, an airport in northeastern Louisiana
