= Regional Institute of Education =

Group of educational institutions in India

The Regional Institute of Education (RIE, formerly known as Regional College of Education), is a constituent unit of the National Council of Educational Research and Training (NCERT), New Delhi. The RIEs are set up in 1963 by Government of India in different parts covering various regions. The Regional Institutes were started with the objective of qualitative improvement of school education through innovative pre-service and in-service teacher education programmes and relevant research, development and extension activities.

The RIEs are located at:

Name	Indian State Covered
RIE Ajmer	Chandigarh, Haryana, Himachal Pradesh, Jammu and Kashmir, Ladakh, National Capital Territory of Delhi, Punjab, Rajasthan, Uttar Pradesh, Uttarakhand
RIE Bhopal	Chhattisgarh, Dadra and Nagar Haveli, Daman and Diu, Goa, Gujarat, Madhya Pradesh, Maharashtra
RIE Bhubaneswar	Odisha, Andaman and Nicobar Islands, Bihar, Jharkhand, West Bengal, Arunachal Pradesh, Assam, Manipur, Meghalaya, Mizoram, Nagaland, Sikkim, Tripura
RIE Mysuru	Andhra Pradesh, Karnataka, Kerala, Lakshadweep, Puducherry, Telangana, Tamil Nadu
NE-RIE Shillong	Arunachal Pradesh, Assam, Manipur, Meghalaya, Mizoram, Nagaland, Sikkim, Tripura

The Regional Institutes of Education (RIEs) located in Ajmer, Bhopal, Bhubaneswar and Mysore cater to the educational needs (pre-service and inservice education) of teachers/teacher educators in the States and UTs under their jurisdiction. Pre-service professional training programmes are offered to prepare school teachers for teaching of different school subjects. These are Regional Resource Institutions for school and teacher education and they extend assistance in implementing the policies of the States/UTs and help in monitoring and evaluation of the Centrally Sponsored Schemes.

The North-East Regional Institute of Education (NERIE), Shillong caters to the inservice educational needs of North-Eastern States as indicated earlier. However, the pre-service teacher preparation programmes for the North-East Region are still being taken care by RIE, Bhubaneswar.

A Demonstration Multipurpose School (DMS) is attached to each RIE at Ajmer, Bhopal, Bhubaneswar and Mysore as a laboratory for preparation of teachers and for trying out innovative practices in school education and teacher education. These are also used as model schools in their respective regions. There is facility of teaching-learning from pre-school to senior secondary level in these schools.

== Courses Offered ==
The following courses are offered at RIE Bhubaneswar:

1. Four year Integrated B.Sc., B.Ed.
2. Four year Integrated B.A., B.Ed.
3. Two year M.Ed.
4. Two Year B.Ed. (Secondary)
5. Three Years Integrated B.Ed.-M.Ed.
6. M.Phil in Education
7. M.Sc.Ed (Life Science, Mathematics, Chemistry, Physics) will take 6 years
8. One Year DCGC (Diploma in Guidance & Counseling)- certification is done by NCERT
9. Pre-Ph.D course in Education- one semester

(RIE, Bhubaneswar is declared as a nodal centre for Education as a discipline under Utkal University, Bhubaneswar).

The other RIEs offered some of the courses from the above-mentioned list the MSc.Ed. in Mathematics, Chemistry and Physics are offered by RIE, Mysore. All these RIEs are affiliated to nearby university for running the courses for the requirement of certification of the graduates come out of different courses for eg. RIE Ajmer is affiliated to Maharshi Dayanand Saraswati University Ajmer. Each RIE has a managing committee where in the corresponding Vice-Chancellor of the university acts as Chairman. University monitors academic affairs of the Institutes in collaboration with RIE faculty. NCERT being the supreme authority of all regional institutes, controls administrative affairs of each of its unit located in aforesaid parts of the country.
