= Dinesh Prasad Saklani =

Indian Historian

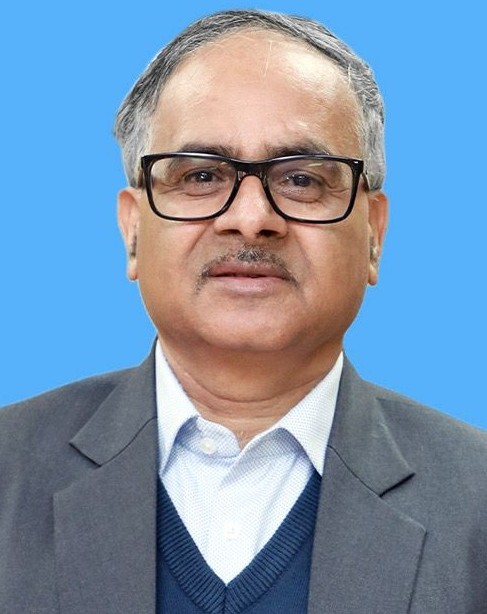
- Prof Saklani in 2026
- Born: 1 January 1963 (age 63)
- Citizenship: India

Academic work
- Discipline: History

Dinesh Prasad Saklani (born January 1, 1963) is an Indian historian, academician, and educational administrator, who has been serving as the Director of the National Council of Educational Research and Training (NCERT) since February 2022. He is one of the key persons responsible for implementing the National Education Policy 2020 and the National Curriculum Framework for School Education (NCF-SE 2023) by introducing newly developed NCERT textbooks for school education in India.

== Early life and education ==
Dinesh Prasad Saklani was born in a village, Pujargaon Saklan, in Tehri Garhwal district of Uttarakhand. His wife, Sarla Saklani, is Head of the Department of Pharmaceutical Chemistry of Hemwati Nandan Bahuguna Garhwal University. The family has a son and a daughter.

Saklani began his academic career as a lecturer at SDPG College in Ghaziabad (November 1990 to April 1992), before joining Hemwati Nandan Bahuguna Garhwal University as a faculty member. At Hemwati Nandan Bahuguna Garhwal University, he had held several key administrative and academic positions, including Campus Director and Head of the Department of History, Ancient Indian History, Culture & Archaeology, and also as a Chief Proctor.

In February 2022, he was appointed as the Director of National Council of Educational Research and Training (NCERT) in New Delhi by the Government of India. From February 2022 to January 2023, he concurrently held the additional charge of Chairperson of the National Council for Teacher Education (NCTE).

== Awards ==
- Awarded the National Fellowship by the Indian Institute of Advanced Study (IIAS), Shimla in January 2022.
