= National Achievement Survey =

Educational assessment survey in India

The National Achievement Survey (NAS) is a comprehensive educational assessment survey conducted in India every three years. It is administered by the Department of School Education and Literacy, which operates under the Ministry of Education. Since its inception in 2001, the NAS has been conducted eight times. The survey evaluates the learning capabilities and achievements of students in Classes 3, 5, 8, and 10 attending state government schools, government-aided schools, private unaided schools, and central government schools. The NAS serves as an indicator of the effectiveness of the educational system in India, helping to identify gaps and inform the implementation of appropriate remedial measures.

== History ==
The National Achievement Survey (NAS) started as an independent initiative by National Council of Educational Research and Training (NCERT). In 2000, recognizing that NAS's goals aligned with the broader objective of achieving 100% literacy, it was integrated into the Sarva Shiksha Abhiyan (SSA), managed by the Ministry of Education. The most recent survey was conducted in 2021, following a delay caused by the COVID-19 pandemic. Learnings of NAS 2017 and NAS 2021 were also used in Project SATH-Education of the NITI Aayog.

== Administration ==
The test is administered by a National Steering Committee which includes members from the Department of School Education and Literacy, Central Board of Secondary Education (CBSE), NCERT, UNICEF, National Informatics Centre and NITI Aayog. Ground level operations are managed by state and district level nodal officers and observers.

== Methodology ==
The test includes the Pupil Questionnaire (PQ), Teacher Questionnaire (TQ) and School Questionnaire (SQ) and Achievement Test (AT). The National Achievement Survey (NAS) encompasses three distinct components targeted at teachers, students, and schools. Each group receives specific questionnaires that cover topics such as school and teaching experience, demographic information, affiliation status, and family education, among others. Responses are recorded on optical mark recognition (OMR) sheets for subsequent processing and evaluation. The survey utilized the Unified District Information System for Education (UDISE+) database to select schools across various regions of the country for NAS-2021.

The NAS assesses a range of subjects depending on the class level. For Classes 3 and 5, the subjects include Language, Mathematics, and Environmental Studies. For Class 8, the subjects are Language, Mathematics, Science, and Social Science. For Class 10, the subjects assessed are Modern Indian Language, Mathematics, Science, Social Science, and English. Data analysis of NAS-2021 was conducted using both item response theory and classical test theory.

== Purpose ==
The survey aims to understand the teaching tools and techniques, infrastructure, school environment. The 2021 survey also focused on the effects of the COVID-19 pandemic in education. Data from the National Achievement Survey (NAS) has been utilized in various government initiatives, including Project SATH-E by NITI Aayog and numerous teacher training programmes. After NAS-2021, workshops were conducted at different levels for educational administrators and teachers.

== Results ==
=== NAS 2017 ===
A total of 2.2 million students from 110,000 schools participated in the survey.

Average Performance of Students at National level (scored out of 500)
Language	Mathematics	Environmental Studies	Modern Indian Languages	Science	Social Science	English
-	253	-	254	253	254	253

=== NAS 2021 ===
A total of 3.4 million students from 118,000 schools participated in the survey which concluded on 12 November 2021. This survey showed the relative decline of learning in students from NAS 2017 which is mainly attributed to the impact of the COVID-19 pandemic on education.

Average Performance of Students at National level (scored out of 500)
Language	Mathematics	Environmental Studies	Modern Indian Languages	Science	Social Science	English
311	266	295	260	228	243	277
