= Demonstration School, Mysore =

Demonstration Multipurpose School, Mysore.
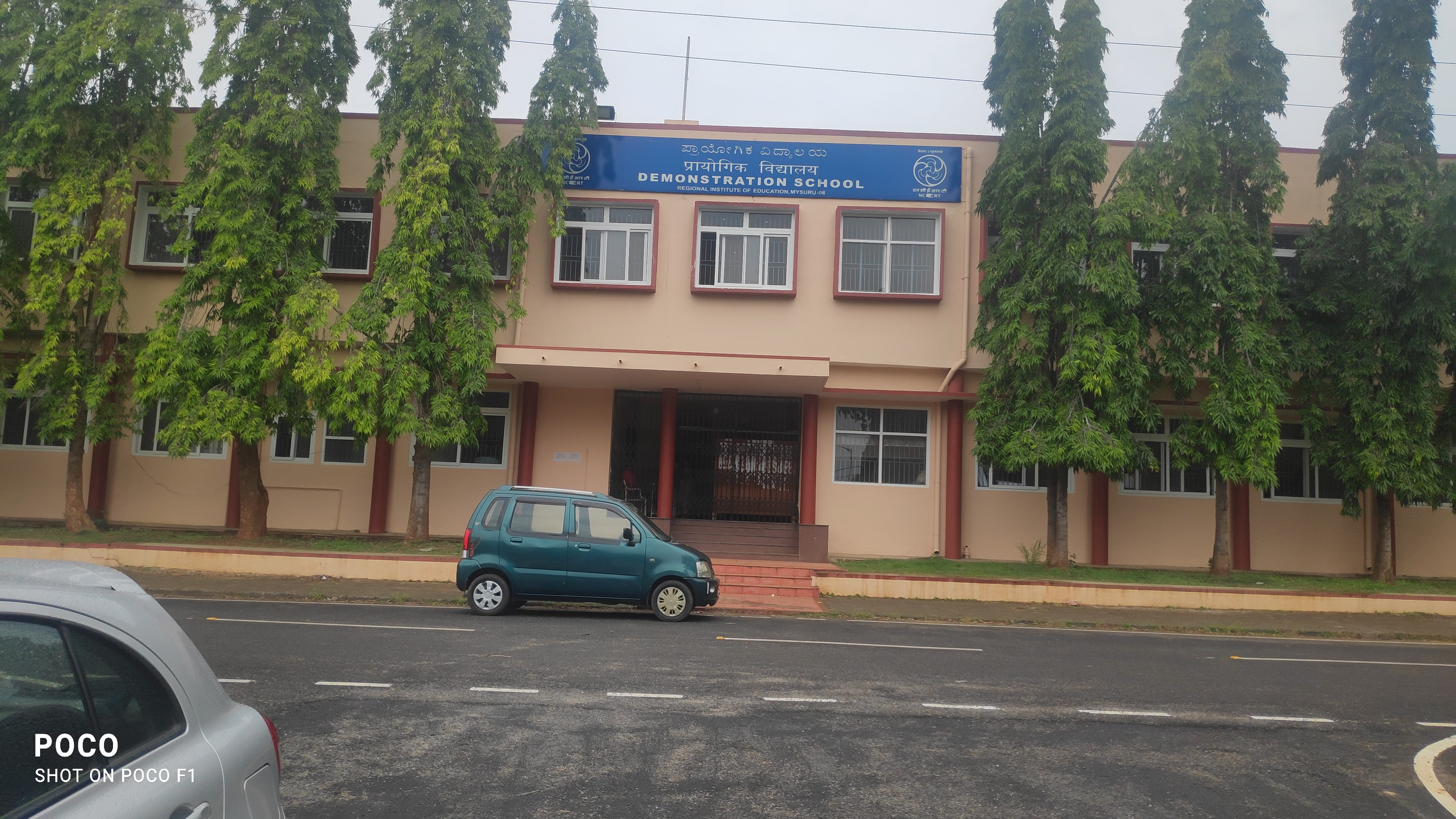

Location
- J.C.E. College Road, Opposite AIISH, Manasa Gangothri, 570006; Mysore, Karnataka; India

Information
- Type: Central Government school
- Established: 1964
- Authority: Regional Institute of Education, Mysore
- Enrollment: 846
- Campus size: 120 acres (490,000 m^{2})
- Affiliation: Central Board of Secondary Education (CBSE)
- Website: https://dms.riemysore.ac.in/

Demonstration Multipurpose School (DMS), Mysore now officially known as Demonstration School, Mysore, is one of the four schools which are spread across four cities in India (Bhopal, Bhubaneswar, Ajmer, and Mysore). Demonstration School is a coeducational school for day scholars in Mysore, India. It was founded by the Regional Institute of Education as a laboratory for the preparation of teachers and for trying out innovative practices in school education and teacher education. The school is surrounded by educational institutes like Sri Jayachamarajendra College of Engineering, All India Institute of Speech and Hearing, and Gangothri School, and spreads over 120 acres (490,000 m2) of land in the city of Mysore.

== Origins ==
The school has a teaching staff of 55 teachers and a student population of nearly 1000 students studying in classes I to XII. Besides carrying out the functions of a typical school, it also functions as a laboratory for experimentation and tryout of new strategies and instructional training programs of the institute. The school provides opportunities for the B.Sc. Ed. students to observe, learn, and participate in teaching and serves as a center for the cooperative training and research endeavor of the staff of the institute. The school is affiliated with the Central Board of Secondary Education (CBSE) and is known for its innovative approaches to teaching and evaluation and lays emphasis on the total development of the child's personality. Competency-Based Teaching (CBT) with an action research approach has been implemented in the school with effects from 1995 – 96.

== Alumni ==
Established in 2009, DMS Mysore Alumni Association. (Warning: Misleading website)
