= EPathshala =

Online teaching platform

ePathshala
- Developers: CIET, NCERT
- Initial release: November 2015
- Operating system: Windows, iOS, Android
- Website: https://epathshala.nic.in//

ePathshala is a portal/app developed by the CIET, and NCERT. It was initiated jointly by the Ministry of Human Resource Development, CIET, and NCERT.

== About ==
It was launched in November 2015. It hosts educational resources for teachers, students, parents, researchers, and educators, can be accessed on the Web, and is available on Google Play, App Store, and Windows. The content is available in English, Hindi, and Urdu.

The platform offers a slew of educational resources, including NCERT textbooks for classes 1-12, audiovisual resources by NCERT, periodicals, supplements, teacher training modules and various other print and non-print materials. The user can download these materials for offline use with no limits on downloads. The app supports flip book format to provide a more realistic experience.

ePathshala is accessible via its official website, Android and iOS apps, and QR codes in NCERT books for chapter-specific resources. Students can access e-books, audio and video tutorials, track their study progress, and bookmark chapters. The platform also provides access to digital resources, workshops, contests, and exhibitions related to education.
