= Yuvabharathi Public School =

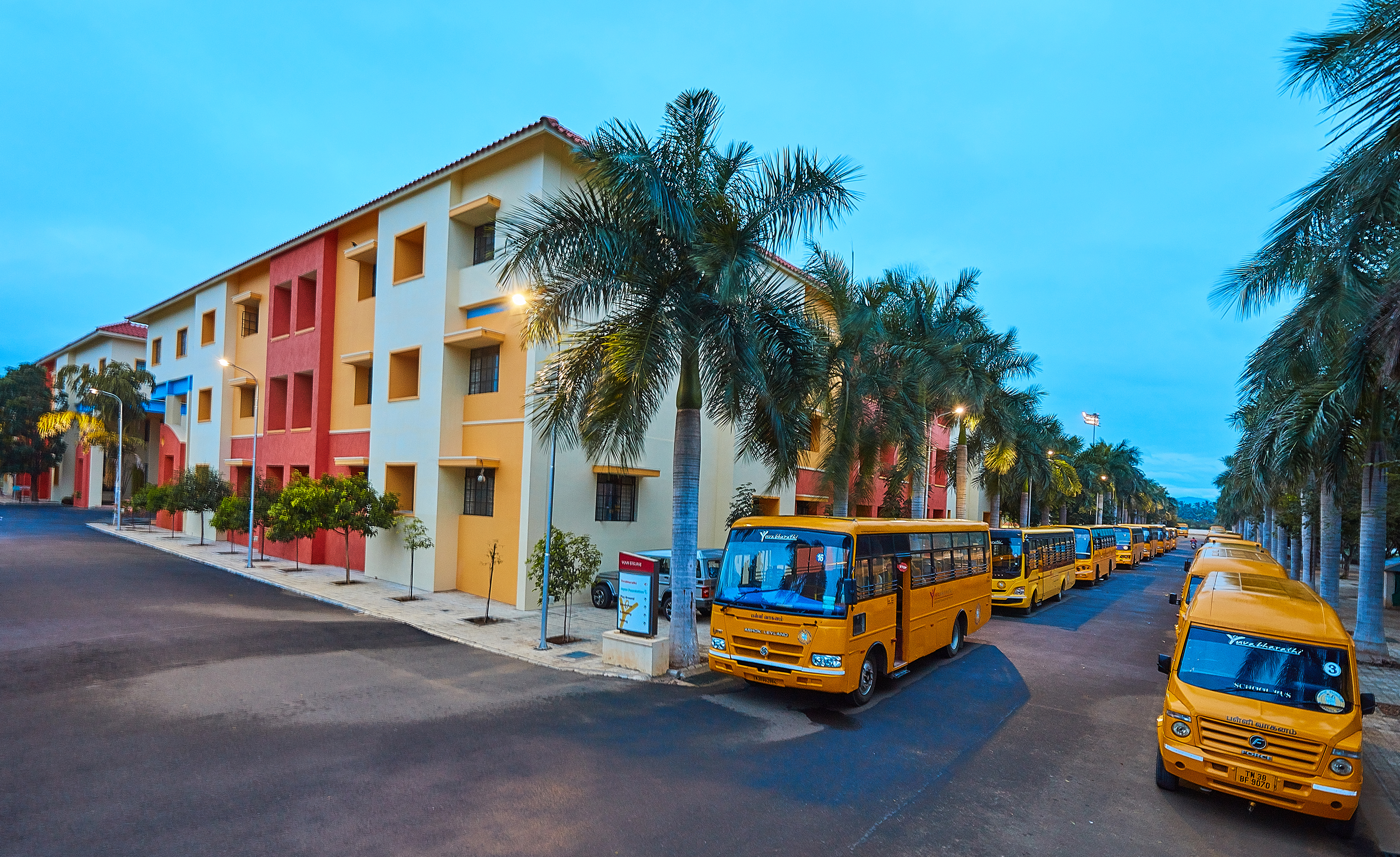

Location
- Yuva Enclave, Kanuvai - Thudiyalur Road, Somayampalayam Post, Kanuvai; Coimbatore, Tamil Nadu, 641108; India; 11.067095°N 76.916370°E

Information
- Type: Private school
- Established: 2005
- School board: Central Board of Secondary Education
- Oversight: Bharath Educational Society
- Principal: Sindhu Joseph
- Grades: K–XII
- Gender: Co-educational
- Campus size: 11.236-acre
- Website: www.yuvabharathi.in

Yuvabharathi Public School is a co-educational private school in Coimbatore, Tamil Nadu, India. It was established in 2005 and is part of the Bharat Educational Society. It is affiliated to the Central Board of Secondary Education (CBSE).

== Academics ==
The school provides classes from Kindergarten to Std. XII and prepares students for the CBSE's All India Secondary School Examination and All India Senior School Certificate Examination following the 10 +2 pattern of education. Indian School of Business and Finance (ISBF), New Delhi, and Yuvabharathi Public School have partnership for its Economics, Management and Finance (EMF) Club a first of a kind in India. An initiative to provide students with a platform to learn more about higher studies and careers in the inter-related EMF fields.

== Campus ==
The School has a 11.236-acre campus with maths, science, computer laboratories, a library also has two organic and herbal gardens, and the unique 5.5-cent Miya Waki forest hosting 234 species of trees. Sports facilities have come up with a multi-sport artificial turf at its campus and its said to be the first of its kind facility among schools in South India. Besides the football and cricketing multisport facility, the synthetic turf also has a six-lane running track.

== Extra-curricular activities ==
- National Cadet Corps
- The Bharat Scouts and Guides
- School band

== Awards and recognition ==
British Council International School Award 2015-18

EducationWorld India School Rankings 2016-17

Greenest Campus Award

Best Outstation School Award

Awards for best farming techniques

Economics, Management and Finance (EMF) Club

Awarded Number one Co-ed Day school in Coimbatore by Education World India School Rankings 2020-2021

'Making students experts in All Spheres of Life’ article published in K-12 Magazine

Identified/Recognised as one of the Ten Most Innovative Schools in South India by K-12 Digest (Indian Edition) in April 2021

The government of India's NITI Aayog selected Yuvabharathi Public School to establish Atal Laboratory (ATL) Yuvabharathi Public school is one of the 257 schools that is selected by the Government of India to establish Atal Tinkering Laboratory (ATL) under the Atal Innovation Mission (AIM) in 2016.

Mr. Anand Jeyasingh, the ATL in-charge teacher of Yuvabharathi Public School, joined the ATL Wall of Fame in 2020 for his efforts in encouraging students to build a surveillance system. Yuvabharathi Public School got featured on ATL Wall of fame in 2021 for winning multiple titles in coding excellence.

In 2018, Careers360 studied 9000 schools and rated them based on quantifiable parameters like infrastructure, faculty, students, final results, etc. Yuvabharathi Public School gained an AAAA rating (Standing: Best School) among the 3000 schools rated regarding learning outcomes.

The ATL Marathon is the flagship innovation challenge of the Atal Innovation Mission. As part of the challenge, schools are required to identify community problems and develop innovative solutions through working prototypes.

In the ATL Marathon 2020, Yuvabharathi's project Piranha, a prototype sewage block removal bot, was selected as one of the top 300 innovations at the national level and the top 10 teams in Tamil Nadu state in August 2021 . Atal Innovation Mission, NITI Aayog selected Piranha to participate in the celebration of Azadi Ka Amrit Mahotsav—India @ 75 at Dr. Ambedkar International Center (DAIC), Delhi, in April 2022.

In the ATL Marathon 2021-22, two teams from Yuvabharathi secured their place among the Top 350 teams at the national level. On the 22nd of June 2023, the top 75 teams of ATL Marathon 2021-22 were announced by Atal Innovation Mission, and Yuvabharathi’s Project Nethramithra – an all-in-one Mobile App for the Visually Impaired made it to the Top 75 teams of ATL Marathon 2021-22.

The top teams of ATL Marathon 2022-23 were announced in September 2023. This edition of the Marathon was centered on the G20 theme and saw more than 12,200 innovations from students across every corner of India—the highest participation to date. Yuvabharathi’s Project Smartsanisyster made it to the Top 400 in India and Top 10 in Tamilnadu and is the only team from Coimbatore district to be listed in ATL Marathon 2022–23 Top 400.

== CSR Activities ==
- Yuvabharathi Public school has been associated with Shanti Ashram (NGO) and providing organizational support regarding accompanying communities and persons to alleviate poverty, redress inequalities, create leaders and promote sustainable development.

Students of Yuvabharathi Public School have been regularly participating in ‘Poverty Solutions’ which was initiated by Shanti Ashram (NGO) in 2012 which has nurtured the spirit of charity by buying a piggy bank and filling it with savings/ pocket money.

The contribution from the piggy banks get translated into scholarships for underprivileged children, immunization and anemia screening drives for children and adolescent girls, food banks, and nutritional literacy programmes.

- The students participated in the ‘Standing Up With A Million Indian Children’ campaign, an initiative by Shanti Ashram to ensure the protection of the rights of children and ensure their progress and protection.
- Athishey Kiran and Adarsh got the opportunity to attend GenFest 2012 held in Budapest in recognition of their work at Shanti Ashram with HIV positive children. Swasthika Anand, a Yuvabharathi student, was one of the three children who represented India at the GNRC (Global Network of Religions for Children) 5th Forum based on the theme: “Ending Violence against Children: Faith Communities in Action” organised by Arigatou International in collaboration with Global Network of Religions for Children members in May 2017 in Panama City, Panama.
- Yuvabharathi conducts a Blood donation camp joining hands with the Ganga Hospitals, Coimbatore in the month of August every year since 2014 in commemoration of our Independence Day. The school was honoured with the Design for Change I CAN award in 2014 for this noble initiative taken by the students.
- Yuvabharathi has conducted fairs to raise funds during the Pongal festival and contributed the amount to support the Gaja Cyclone relief fund and the education of underprivileged children in 2019 and 2020 respectively.
- The students actively participate in SEWA (Social Empowerment through Work Education and Action) as a part of the CBSE curriculum and complete their projects based on the individual and group social or community service.
- The school adopted the nearby village with the objective of spreading awareness regarding food waste and cleanliness. A free medical camp was conducted in this village for the well-being of the women.
- The students of the Department of Mass Media Studies of Yuvabharathi Public School organised and conducted MovieZen, an online Film Festival in August 2021. The fund collected through the tickets sold to the school community was donated to Humane Animal Society (HAS), Coimbatore an NGO that provides food, shelter and appropriate rehabilitation to stray animals.
