= Sowdeswari Vidyalaya Coimbatore =

Coordinates: 10°59′47.29″N 76°56′1.76″E

Sri Sowdeswari Vidyalaya Matriculation Higher Secondary school

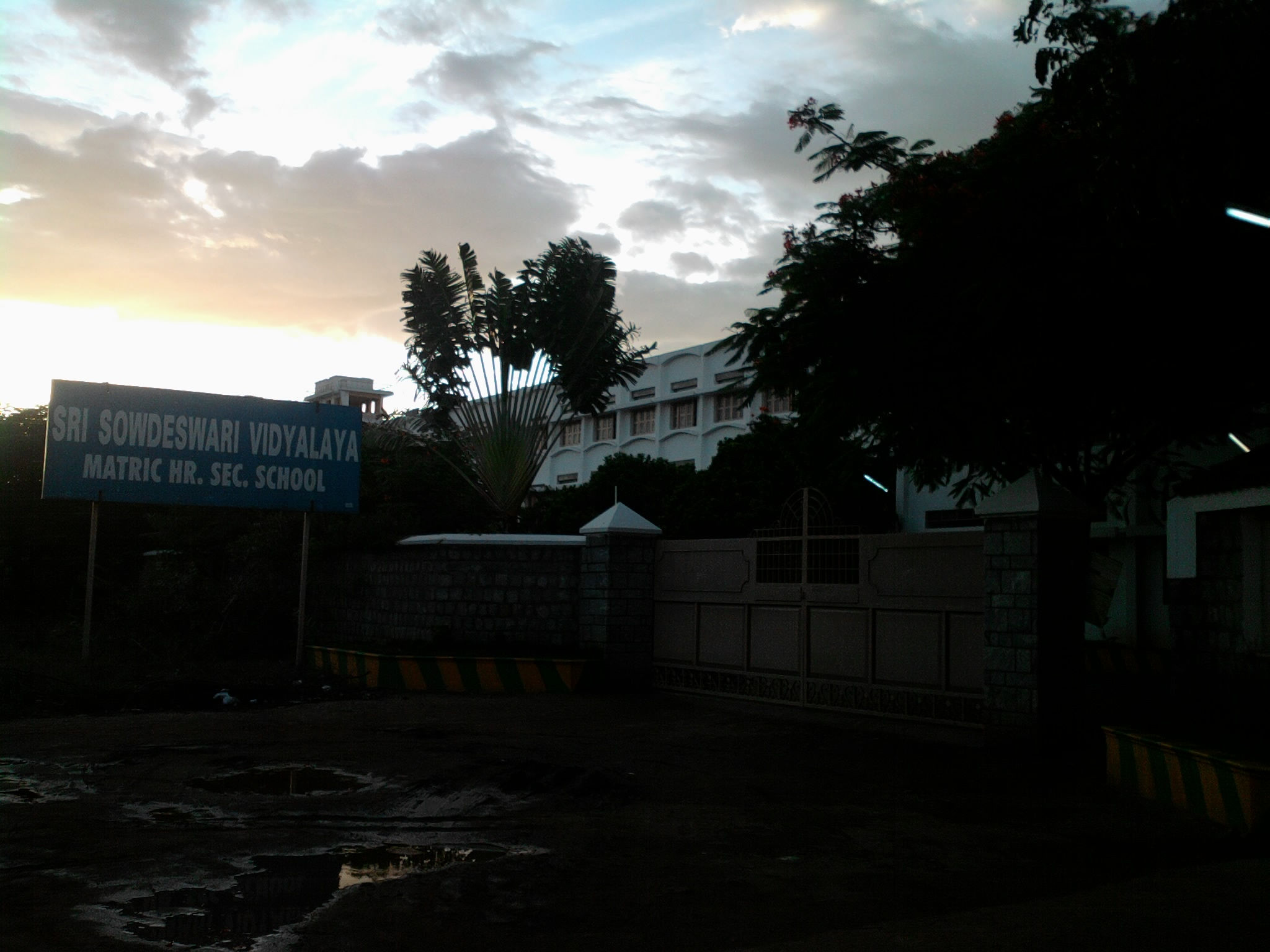
- Entrance

Location
- Arul Garden Ramamurthy Road, Selvapuram; Coimbatore, Tamil Nadu, 641026; India

Information
- Type: Self financed
- Motto: உள்ளுவதெல்லாம் உயர்வுள்ளல் (All thoughts be lofty)
- Established: 1 June 1977
- Founder: Nachimuthu Chettiar
- School board: Samacheer Kalvi
- Principal: Mr. Balamurugan
- Teaching staff: 94
- Enrollment: 3080
- Classes: LKG to 12th std
- Affiliation: Tamil Nadu Higher Secondary Board

The Sri Sowdeswari Vidyalaya Matriculation Higher Secondary School, Coimbatore or SSV Matric, is in Coimbatore, Tamil Nadu, India. The school is run by Sri Ramalinga Sowdeswari Charitable Trust. The school educates students from LKG to Standard 12. It offers education as per the Samacheer Kalvi and Higher Secondary board or Tamil Nadu State Board syllabus. It is an English medium school. On Annual Day each year important personalities are invited.

== History ==
The school was started on 1 June 1977 in a rented building at D.B.Road R.S.Puram. In 1997 the school shifted to its own building at Chokampudur, Coimbatore where the present campus is located.

== Sports ==
Sports facilities available are:

- Basketball court
- Football ground
- Throw ball
- Handball
- Ball badminton
- Table tennis
- Shuttle badminton
- Kho-Kho
- Volleyball court

Students won two gold medals in the 200m running race and the javelin throw in the SDAT National women's sports festival district level competition 1held at Nehru Stadium, Coimbatore. In 2015, L.B. Nivetha, student of this school was one of the state topper in the Higher Secondary Examinations with a total of 1192 (out of 1200) marks and Tamil as their first language.

== Facilities ==
- Computer Lab
- Science Lab
- Communication Hall
- Student Teachers Canteen
- School Library
- Edu comp
- Physical Education Room
- student's Health room
- Separate Kinder Garden block
- CCTV protected

== Extra curriculars ==
- Yoga
- Music
- Quiz club [Cryptex quiz club]
- Scouts & Guides
- JRC[junior red cross]
- RSP[road safety patrol]
- Abacus
- Karate
- Silambam
- Hindi
