= Vasanta College for Women =

College in Uttar Pradesh, India

- Logo of the college
- Motto: Be your own light
- Type: Public women's college
- Established: 1913; 113 years ago
- Parent institution: Banaras Hindu University
- Principal: Alka Singh
- Location: Rajghat, Uttar Pradesh; 25.328622°N 83.040487°E
- Website: www.vasantakfi.ac.in

Vasanta College for Women, also known as Vasanta College, is a women's college in Rajghat, Varanasi (India), admitted to the privileges of the Benaras Hindu University. It was established in 1913 by Dr. Annie Besant.

== History ==
Vasanta College was founded by Annie Besant in 1913. The college initially was situated in the compound of the Theosophical Society at Kamachha, Bhelupura, Varanasi. In 1954, Jiddu Krishnamurti, foster son of Dr. Annie Besant established the college in Rajghat and in the same year, Vasant Kanya Mahavidyalaya commenced operations in the older facility of Vasanta College.

Vasanta College is situated in a campus of 300 acres and overlooks the river Ganges.

== See also ==
- Benaras Hindu University
- List of educational institutions in Varanasi
