= Sankara Educational Institutions =

SANKARA EDUCATIONAL INSTITUTIONS
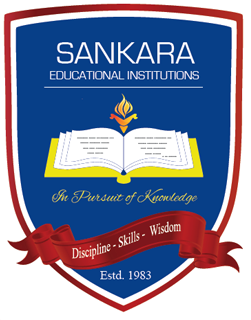
- Motto: Education for Life
- Type: UNDER GRADUATE POST GRADUATE DIPLOMA
- Established: 1983; 43 years ago
- Principal: Dr.V.Radhika
- Students: 3500
- Location: Coimbatore, Tamil Nadu, India
- Campus: Sankara Campus, Saravanampatty
- Language: ENGLISH
- Website: http://www.sankara.ac.in/sims/Index.aspx

The Sankara Educational Institutions, sponsored by the Coimbatore Educational and Cultural Foundation Trust, was founded by Shri.T.K.Pattabhiraman in 1983. The three institutions under Sankara Educational Institutions are

- Sankara Institute of Management Science
- Sankara College of Science and Commerce
- Sankara Polytechnic College

== Sankara Institute of Management Science ==
The Sankara Institute of Management Science (SIMS) is a Business School located in Saravanampatty, in Coimbatore, Tamil Nadu. It is approved by All India Council for Technical Education and is affiliated with Bharathiar University T.R.Kalyanaraman, Trustee heads the MBA Department in the position of Joint Secretary.

== Course offered ==
Master of Business Administration

=== Specialization ===
- Marketing
- Human Resource
- Finance
- Systems
- Production
- Shipping & Logistics

Teaching makes use of Management games, role plays and simulation exercise to relate to the development n business world.

The facilities include:

- Ac Gallery Classrooms
- Wifi Campus
- Placement cell
- E-learning
- Digital Business Library

The college has associations such as National Service Scheme (NSS), Youth Red Cross, Placement Cell, Business Line Club, HR Club, Finance Club, IT Club, Marketing Club, System Club and Sports Club.

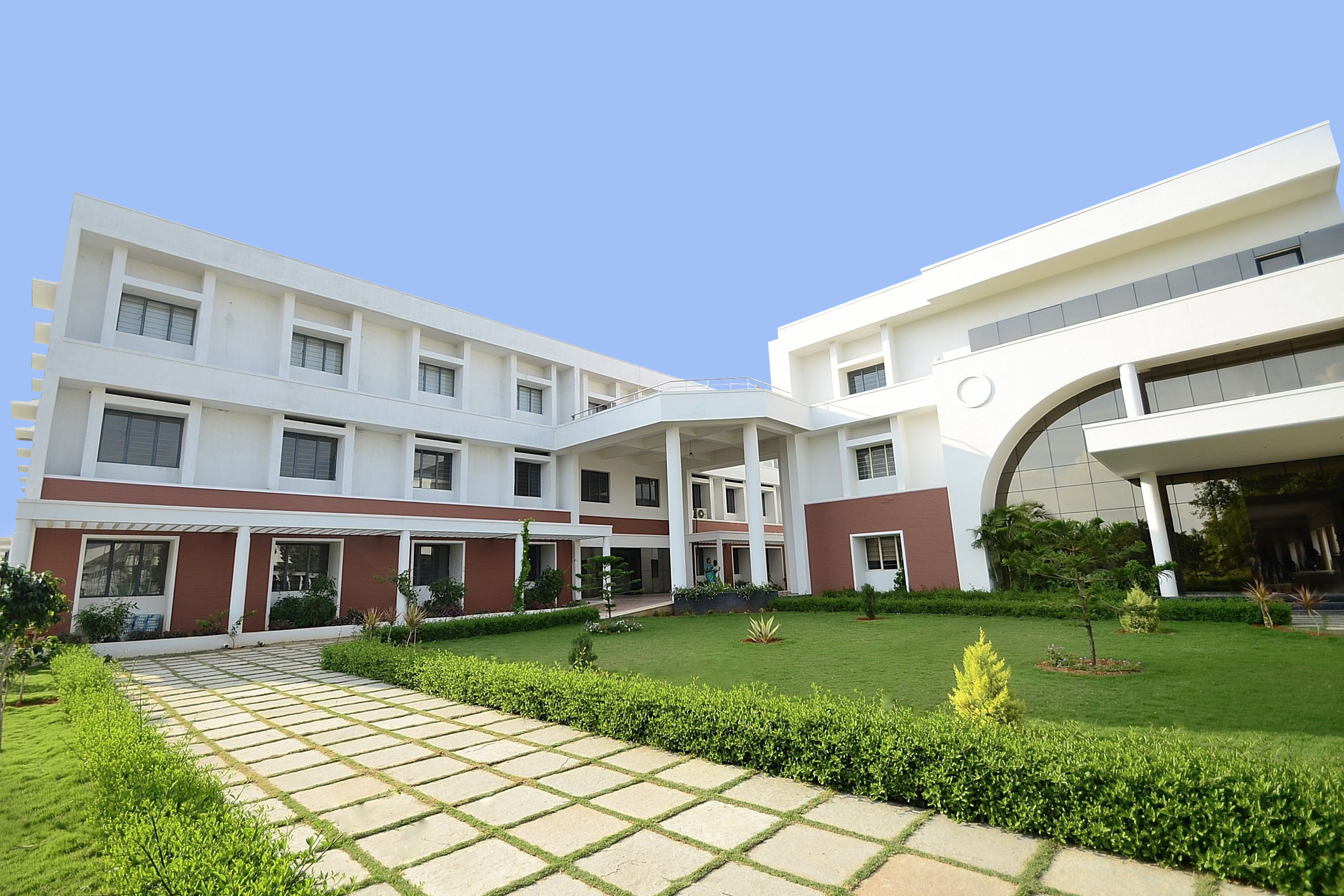
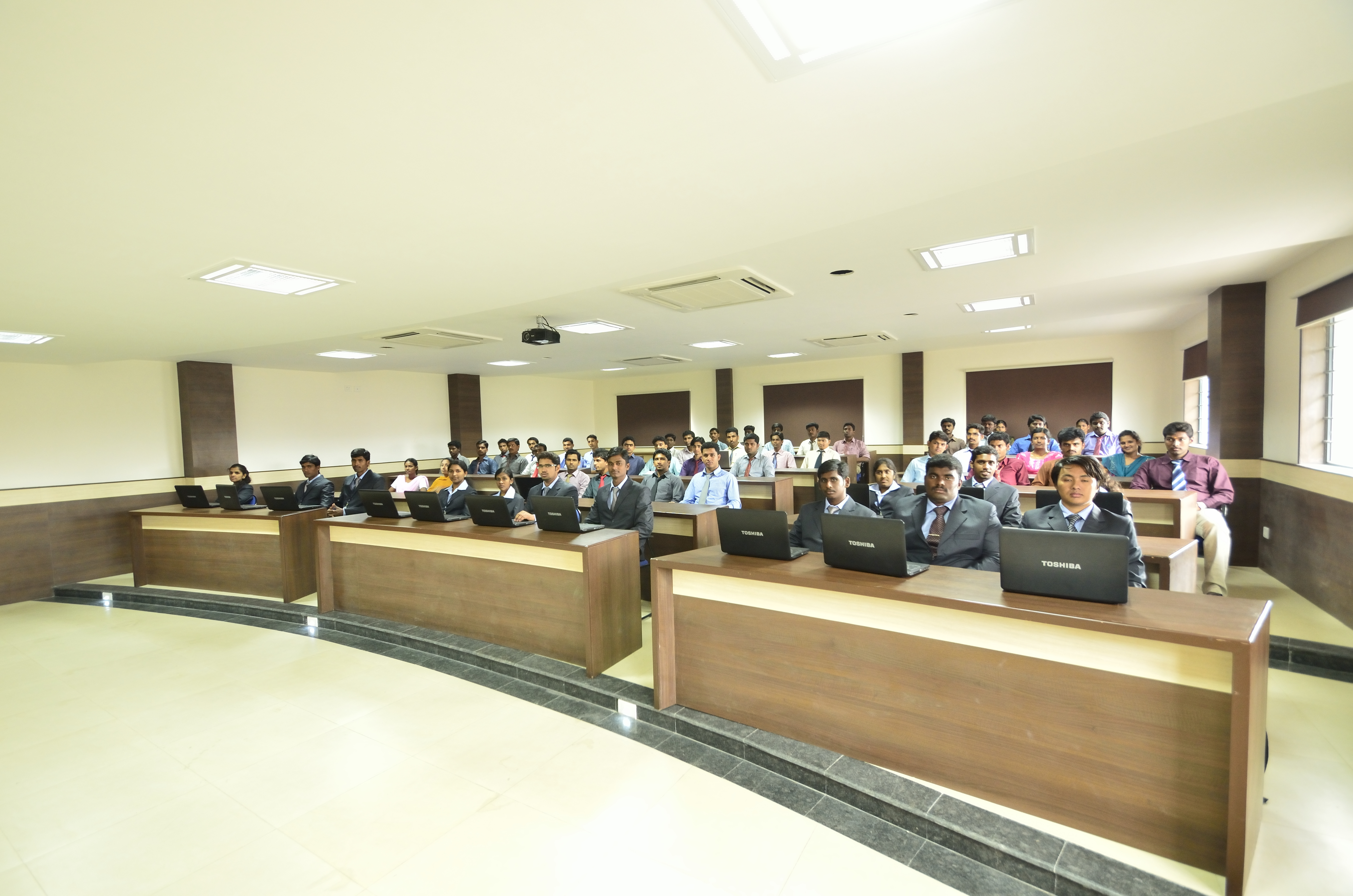
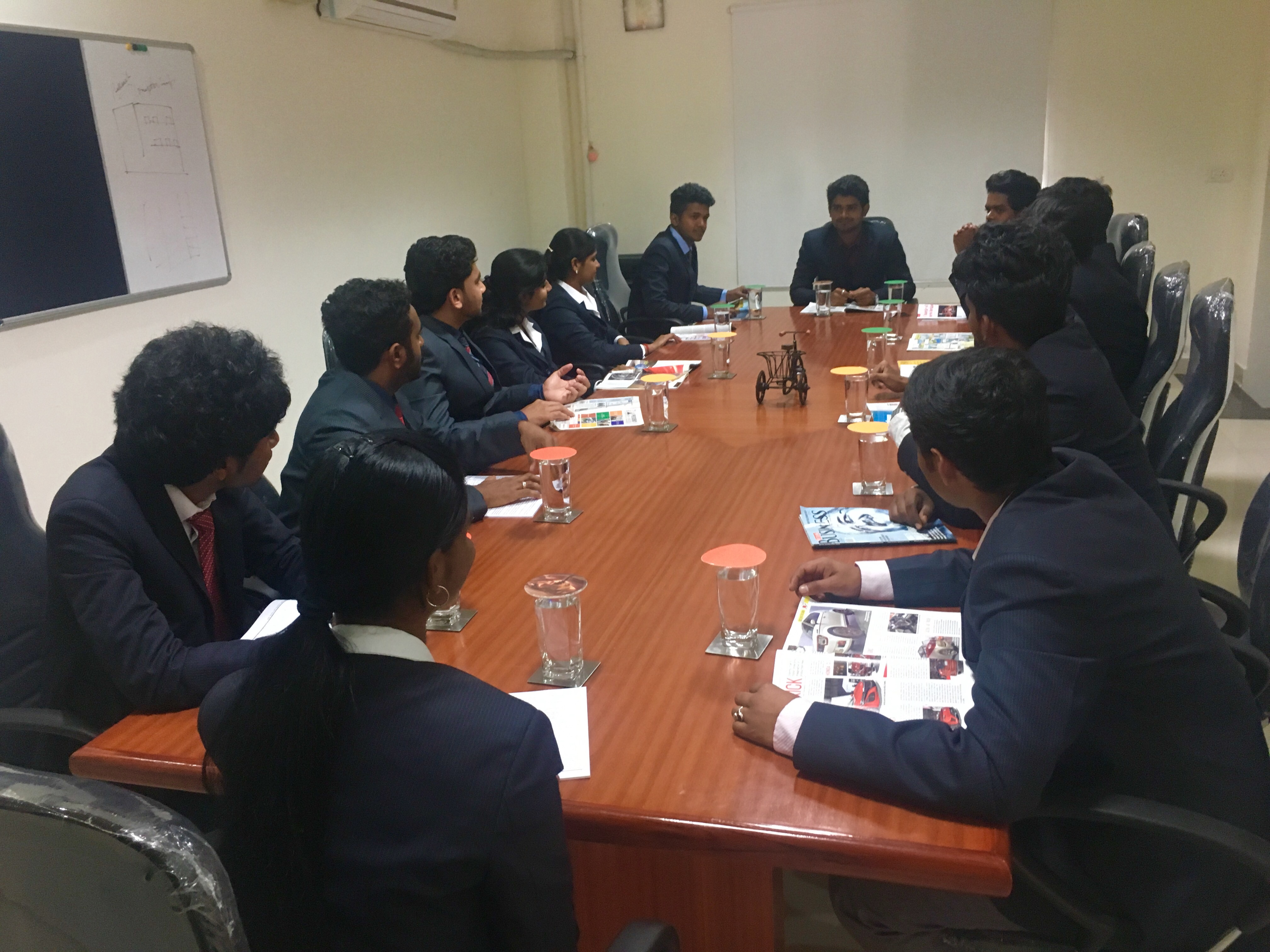

== Sankara College of Science and Commerce ==
Sankara College of Science and Commerce is an Arts College located in Saravanampatty, in Coimbatore, Tamil Nadu. It is approved by All India Council for Technical Education and is affiliated with Bharathiar University.

=== Undergraduate ===
- B.Com.
- B.Com. CA
- B.Com. PA
- BBA CA
- B.Sc. Information Technology
- B.Sc. Electronics and Communication Systems
- B.Sc. Catering Science and Hotel Management
- B.Sc. Computer Science
- B.Sc. Computer Science with Data Analytics

=== Postgraduate ===
- M.Com. - Master of Commerce
- M.Phil.
- MCA
- Ph.D. Commerce

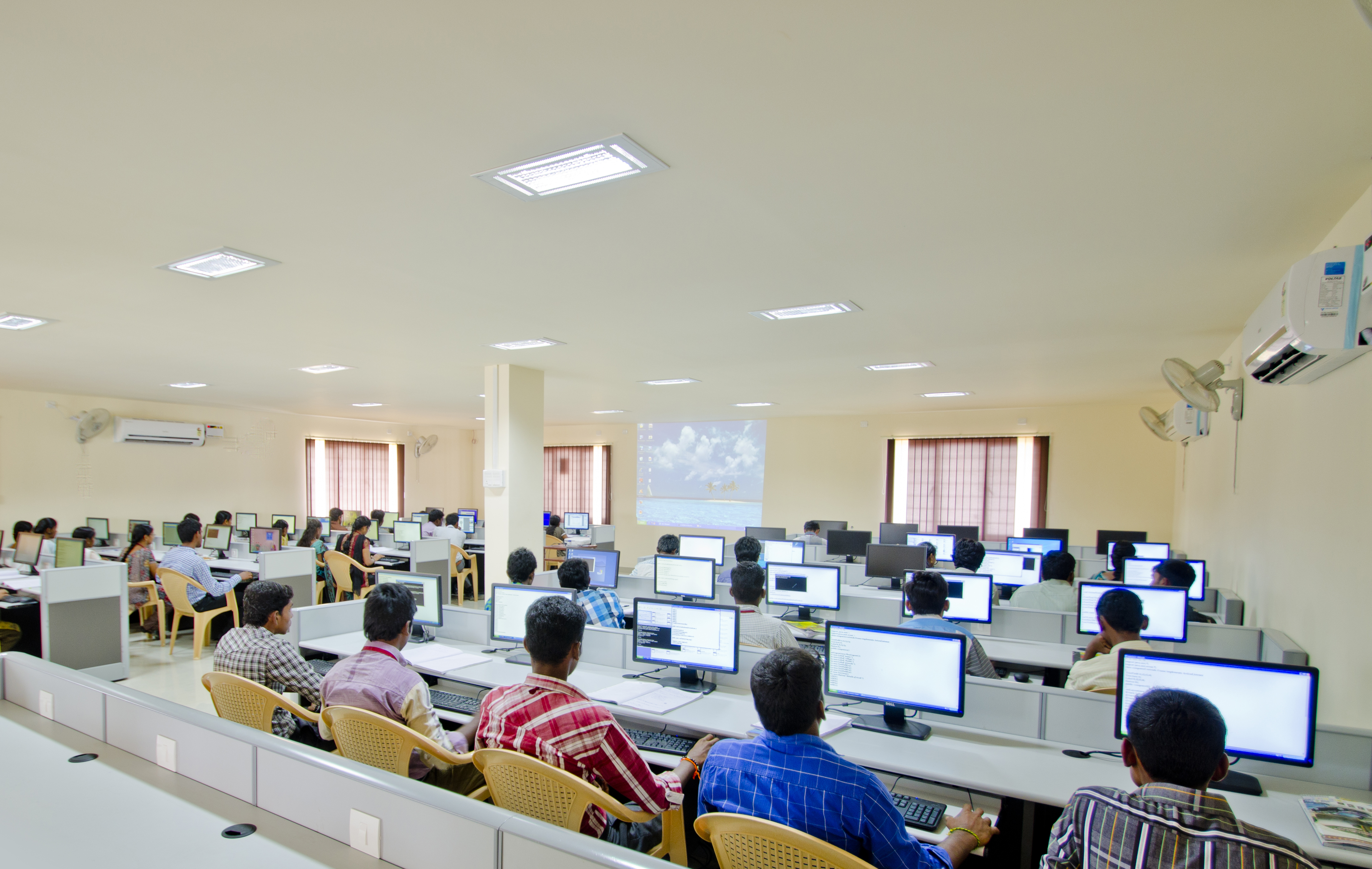

== Sankara Polytechnic College ==
Sankara Polytechnic College (SPC) sponsored by the Coimbatore Educational and Cultural Foundation Trust offers three years full-time Diploma Engineering programme to the students admitted as per AICTE norms and Tamil Nadu State Government rules and regulations. It offers education following the Directorate of Technical Education (DOTE) specified /prescribed curriculum and evaluation system.

Sankara Polytechnic College executes Canada India Institutional Co-operation project. Under this project, various thrust areas are formed. These thrust areas are Continuous Education Program, Student Services, Staff Development, Facility Development, Industry Institution Interaction, Women in development, Environment Development and Management Information System focusing on development in respective areas.

== News, events & activities ==
- Sankara Educational Institutions organised "Pledge to Vote" signature campaign on 19 February at the Fun Republic Mall. The objective of the campaign was to create awareness on the significance of voting in the Assembly election.
- More than 100 students of Sankara Institute of Management Science, Sankara Polytechnic College and Sankara College of Science and Commerce conducted an awareness program on the use of helmet
- Sankara Institute of Management Science recently organised a conference on '25 years of India's tryst with reforms: Bright sparks, dark spots and glimmer of hopes'.
- Sankara College of Science and Commerce is one of the very few colleges in Coimbatore that also admits disabled students
