= Central Institute of Educational Technology =

Educational technology organization in India

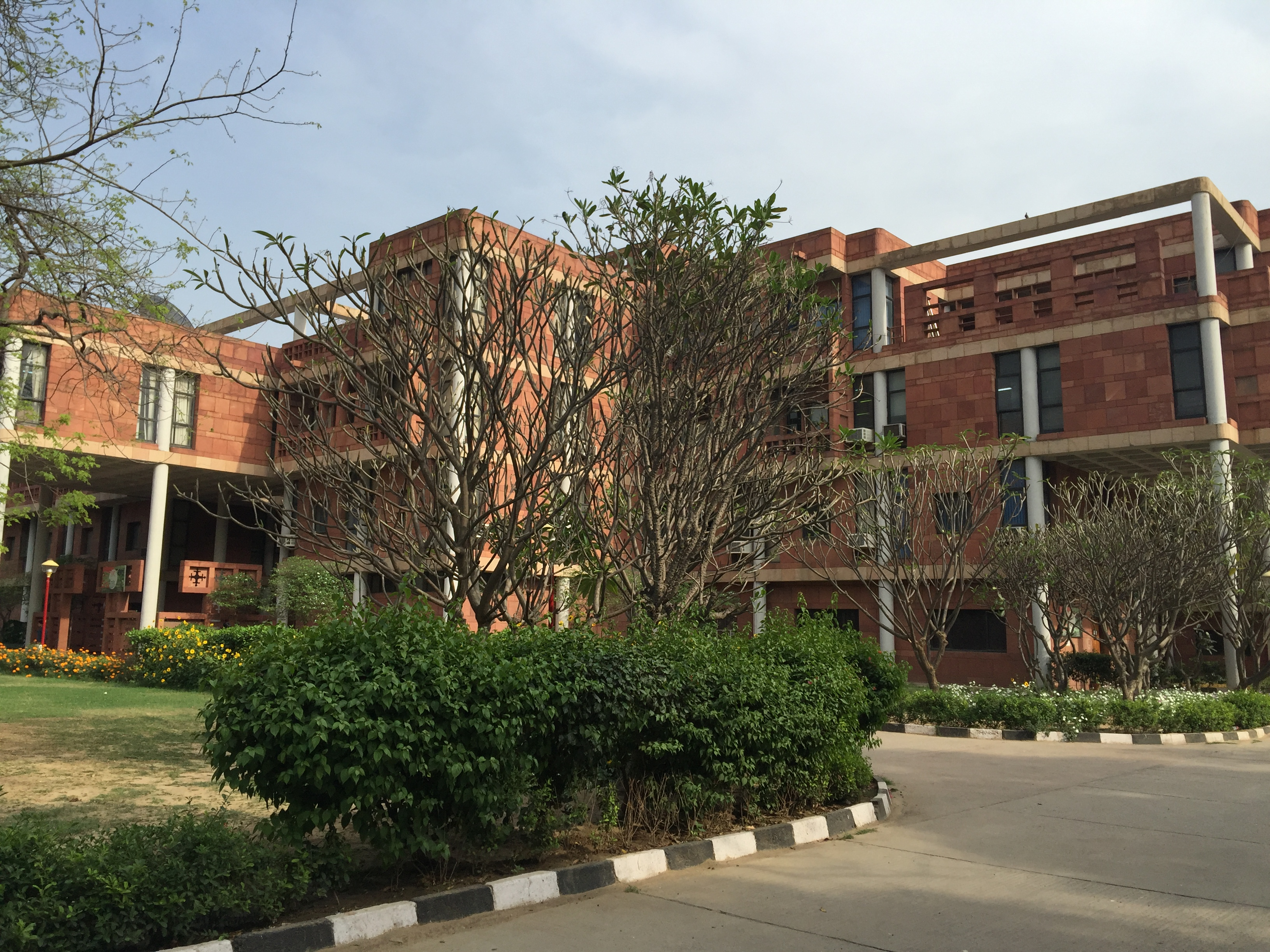
- Other name: CIET
- Type: Educational Institute
- Established: 1984; 42 years ago
- Location: New Delhi, Delhi, India; 28°32′21.4″N 77°11′45.7″E
- Campus: Tigri
- Website: CIET

The Central Institute of Educational Technology (CIET) is an autonomous organization, formed as a nodal agency under the National Council of Educational Research and Training (NCERT) for promoting the use of mass media technology for expanding and improving the quality of education at the school level. The institute is funded by the Ministry of Education, Government of India. The building is dedicated to Children of India and was built by Raj Rewal Associates in 1986

== Profile ==
The Central Institute of Educational Technology (CIET) was established in 1984 by the Ministry of Human Resources Development of Government of India, under the umbrella of the National Council of Educational Research and Training (NCERT). The institute is located at NIE Campus, NCERT in New Delhi, the capital of India.

The origin of the institute was effected by merging two departments of NCERT, Center for Educational Technology and Department of Teaching Aids, with an aim to make the new age technologies in mass media available at the school level. The activities of the Institute are centered on the branches of media such as radio, television, movies, satellite communications and cyber media.

CIET is involved in various activities such as design, development and dissemination of alternative learning systems, promotion of Educational Technology, training of personnel in Educational Technology, coordination of activities of its subsidiaries like the State Institutes of Education Technology (SIET) and consultancy and media support to other constituents of NCERT.

The institute is housed in a spacious building with open courtyards, amphitheater, two television studios, two sound studios, technical control rooms, workshop, seminar rooms, rehearsal areas and projection facilities, library, canteen, administrative areas and artists' studios.

The institute also provides courses in education at bachelors, masters and doctoral levels.

== Facilities ==
Library

CIET maintains three libraries, each dedicated to audio, video and book collections. The library is stocked with contents on educational technologies, radio, television, communication, films, multimedia in the form of books, journals, CDS/DVDs and multimedia packages. The library is open to outside visitors, too.

Edusat Network

CIET utilizes the Edusat, the first Indian satellite exclusively for educational sector. CIET utilizes a Ku-band Sub Hub along with 100 terminals at various locations in India for conventional radio and television broadcast, interactive radio and television (phone-in and video on demand), exchange of data, audio, video and computer conferencing and web based education.

== State Institutes of Educational Technology (SIET) ==
In order to reach all corners of the country, CIET has set up local stations in six states, which operate in coordination with state governments, under the guidance of CIET. The local stations are located at:

- Trivandrum, Thiruvananthapuram, Kerala Director Dr.B. Aburaj
- Hyderabad
- Gujarat
- Pune
- Odisha (which is facing closure due to issues related to utilization of funds)
- Lucknow
