= Sankara College of Science and Commerce =

College in Tamil Nadu, India

Sankara College of Science and Commerce(SANSAC)
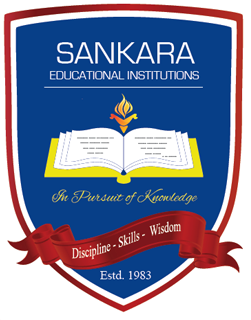
- Motto: Education for Life
- Established: 1982
- Principal: Dr.V.Radhika
- Students: 3500
- Location: Coimbatore, Tamil Nadu, India
- Language: ENGLISH
- Website: http://www.sankara.ac.in/sansac/Courses.aspx?id=17

Sankara College of Science and Commerce is an Autonomous Arts College in Saravanampatti, in the Coimbatore district, Tamil Nadu. It is approved by the All India Council for Technical Education and is affiliated with Bharathiar University. Sankara College of Science and Commerce is accredited by NAAC with 'A' Grade, and also the college is ISO certified.

== History ==
The Sankara Education institutions, sponsored by the Coimbatore Educational and Cultural Foundation Trust, was founded by Sri T.K. Pattabhiraman in August 1982. The other two institutions under Sankara Educational Institutions are Sankara Institute of Management Science (MBA Institute) & Sankara Polytechnic College

== Governing council ==
The college is currently governed by Shri.T.P.Ramachandran (Secretary&Managing Trustee), Mrs.Sandhya Ramachandran (Joint Secretary), Mr.Kalyanaraman TR (Joint Secretary&Trustee) and Mrs. Nithya Ramachandran(Deputy Joint Secretary)

== Location ==
The college is in Saravanampatty, and is 13 km from Coimbatore International Airport.

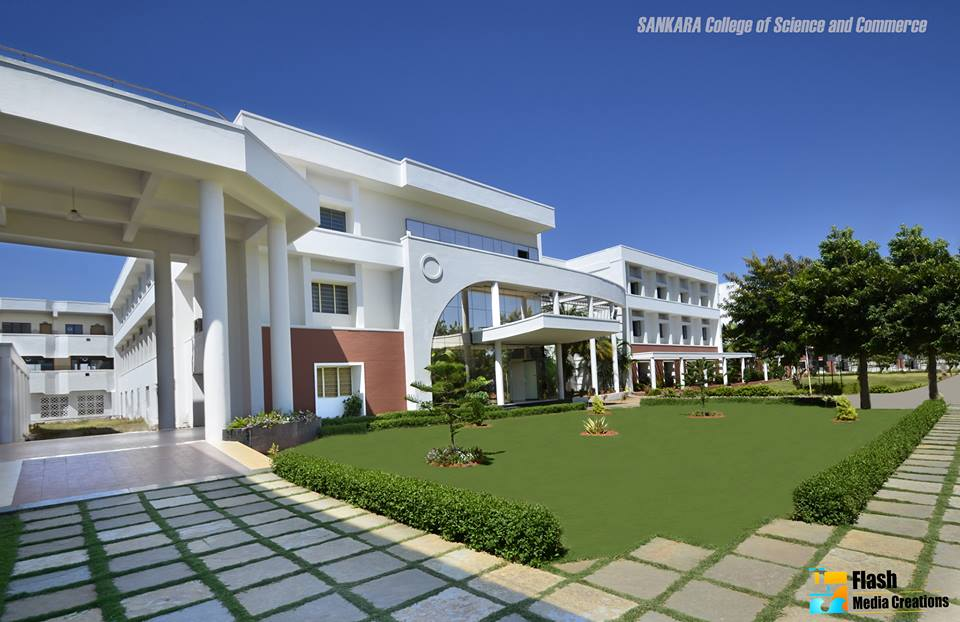

== Academics ==
=== Undergraduate ===
- B.Com.
- B.Com. CA
- B.Com. PA
- BBA CA
- BCA
- B.Sc. Information Technology
- B.Sc. Electronics and Communication Systems
- B.Sc. Catering Science and Hotel Management
- B.Sc. Computer Science
- B.A. English Literature

=== Postgraduate ===
- M.Com. - Master of Commerce
- M.B.A. - Master of Business Administration
- M.Phil.
- MCA
- Ph.D. Commerce

== Campus life ==
Sankara College of Science and Commerce has various associations and clubs such as NSS, Red Cross, Parents Association, Commerce Club, and Sports Club. Student also has access to cafeteria 24/7

== Facilities ==
- State of art Infrastructure
- Modern Computer Lab
- Digital Library
- Separate hostels for boys and girls
- Library
- Placement cell
- Counselling cell
- Ac Seminar Hall
- E-Learning
- Sports Arena
- Transport facilities
