= Timli Sanskrit Pathshala =

Sanskrit school

Shri Timli Vidyapeeth (श्री तिमली संस्कृत पाठशाला)

Location
- Timli, P.O. Devikhet; Pauri Garhwal – 246144; Uttarakhand; India

Information
- School type: Independent boarding school
- Motto: 'विद्या धर्मेण शोभिते' (Vidya Dharmena Shobhite) – Knowledge Shines with Righteousness.
- Founded: 1882
- School district: Pauri Garhwal
- Trust: Shri Timli Trust
- Specialist: Sanskrit, Vedanta and Technology
- President: Ashish Dabral
- Publication: Gurukul Patrika
- School fees: Free School
- Website: www.shritimli.org

Shri Timli Sanskrit Pathshala (श्री तिमली संस्कृत पाठशाला), established in 1882, is the first Sanskrit school in Garhwal Himalaya that was recognized and funded by United Provinces from 1911 to 1915 and offered high school completion programs in Sanskrit (Karmakanda, Tantra and Vedic philosophy) to hundreds of students. In 1952 Shri Timli Sanskrit Pathshala introduced an English as a Second Language program to meet the needs of the students.

From January 2014, Shri Timli Sanskrit Pathshala introduced information technology and modern science to its curriculum and launched a twelve-month integrated program in Sanskrit and information communication technology.

== History ==
=== Founders ===
Shri Timli Sanskrit Pathshala was founded by Badri Datt Dabral, Damodar Dabral, in association with Rao Bahadur Kulanand Barthwal, Bhim Singh Bisht and Madho Singh Thokdar in 1882.

The management committee was upgraded in 1950 with Rai Saheb Radhakrishna Dabral and Umanand Barthwal. Shri Timli Trust was established to revive Shri Timli Sanskrit Pathshala under new name – Shri TImli Vidyapeeth. where modern science and technologies were included into the curriculum.

=== Shri Timli Vidyapeeth ===
Shri Timli Sanskrit Pathshala (श्री तिमली संस्कृत पाठशाला) has been revived in January 2014 by Ashish Dabral where Computer, Sanskrit and English have been given equal importance. Shri Timli Vidyapeeth is an alias to Shri Timli Sanskrit Pathshala re-registered under Shri Timli Trust. Shri Timli Sanskrit Pathshala was known for its Sanskrit education and referred as Kashi of Garhwal Himalaya. Pandit Sadanand Dabral – 1877–1950 and Pandit Lalita Prasad Dabral has significantly contributed to Sanskrit literature and Tantra. Shri Ashish Dabral is the main contributor to revive the Timli Sanskrit pathsala and transform into Universal Gurukul.

=== Sanskrit and Computer Science ===
Shri Timli Vidyapeeth (श्री तिमली संस्कृत पाठशाला) has introduced a unique program in which students are trained with holistic development approach. Gurukul is providing Sanskrit education with Computer Science and also conducts seminars on various topics on regular basis.

=== Sanskrit research ===
Shri Timli Vidyapeeth has a Sanskrit Research Center. There have been suggestions to use Sanskrit as a metalanguage for knowledge representation in e.g. machine translation, and other areas of natural language processing because of its relatively high regular structure. This is due to Classical Sanskrit being a regularised, prescriptivist form abstracted from the much more complex and richer Vedic Sanskrit.

== Universal Gurukul Contact Centre ==
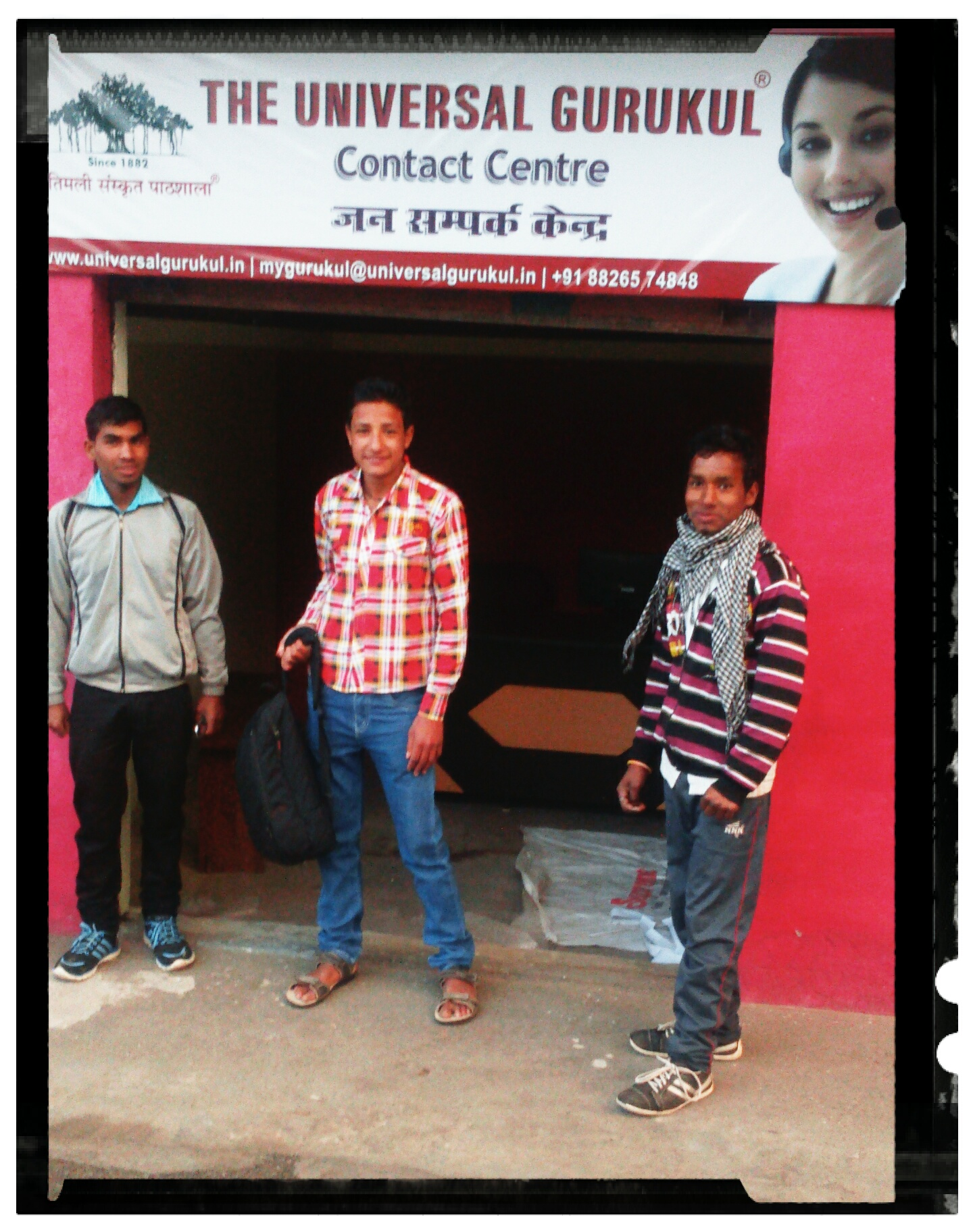
The Universal Gurukul Contact Center – Devikhet, Uttarakhand, India – Started by Gurukul Students in March 2015

First of its kind in Uttarakhand, Shri Timli Vidyapeeth - Universal Gurukul launched its contact centre in March 2015 at Devikhet, Uttarakhand, India. This contact center is managed by Gurukul students with following key objectives:

- A platform for migrant individuals to connect back to their roots.
- Single point of contact for local individuals to resolve their all queries with government offices and semi-government offices.
- An opportunity for migrant individuals to invest in local projects.
- An opportunity to Gurukul students to learn entrepreneurship skills.

== Primary Education Center ==
Shri Timli Vidyapeeth announced to start a primary education center with modern teaching methodologies and techniques which would be operational from April 2015.

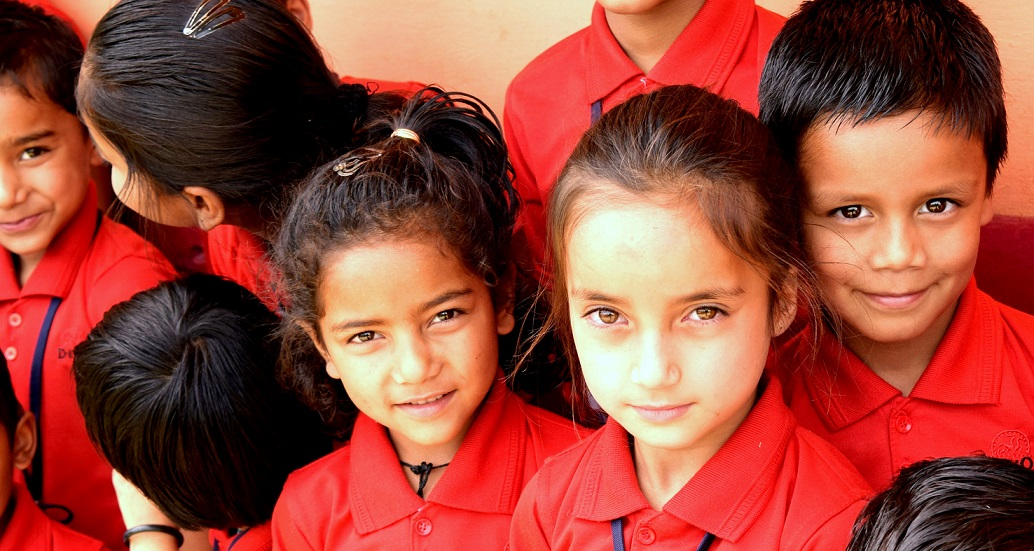
Students of Mainspring (Timli Vidyapeeth), Pauri Garhwal, Uttarakhand, India

== Conversation with International Space Station (ISS) ==
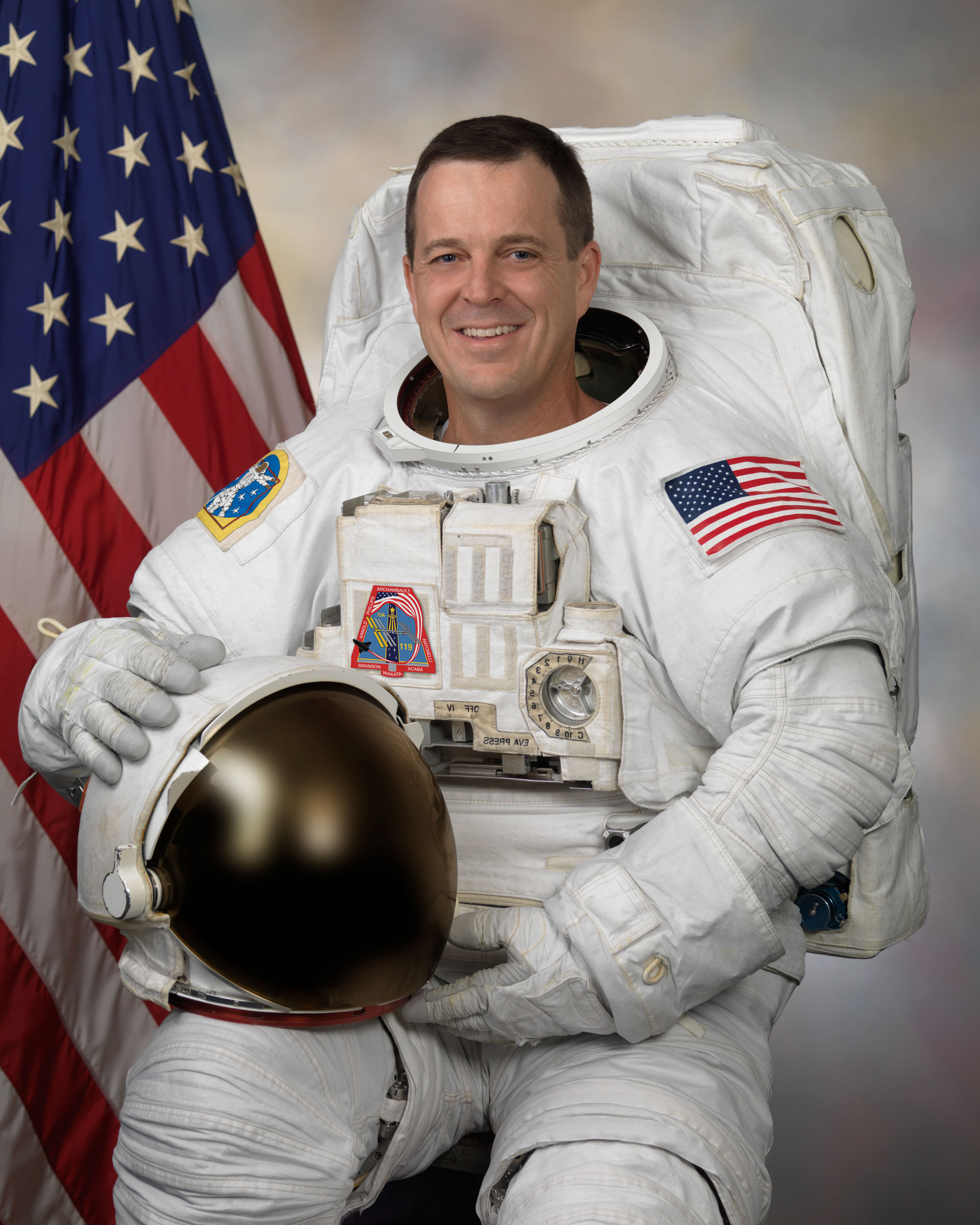
Ricky Arnold

On 27 Auguzst 2018 students of Shri Timli Vidyapeeth got an opportunity to speak with Astronaut Ricky Arnold stationed at International Space Station. Students from various remote Himalayan villages asked their questions directly through teleconferencing via HAM radio station.

== Partnership ==
Shri Timli Vidyapeeth and Little Dragons Pre School in United Kingdom collaborated in February 2016 to improve teaching technique and education standard. This partnership will help students of both great nations to exchange cultural values.

== Participation in World Robot Olympiad ==
Since 2016, students of Shri Timli Vidyapeeth are participating in World Robot Olympiad. Robotics is a part of the curriculum and students from remote Himalayan villages learn LEGO based microprocessor programming and have represented Shri Timli Viyapeeth at National level as well.

== Courses offered ==
Presently, Shri Timli Vidyapeeth is offering free elementary education through a formal School and also upskilling youth of rural Uttarakhand through its Technology Center under the flagship of Uttarakhand Technology Club. Shri Timli Vidyapeeth elementary school is for young children of 3 to 12 years age group and Technology Center offers Information Communication Technology programs for 12- to 24-year-old students at various independent centres in Uttarakhand.

=== Shri Timli Vidyapeeth Courses ===
Shri Timli Vidyapeeth focuses on Vedic education (Vedas, Upanishads, Vedanta) with modern science and technology. Currently, Gurukul school is offering regular education from Nursery to Fifth standard conceptual and level appropriate education using:

- Science Kit and Brain development kits
- Yoga and Meditation
- Sanskrit and Vedic Studies
- Information Communications Technology
- English Language Lab
- Sports Activities

=== Technology Center Courses ===
Presently, Shri Timli Vidyapeeth Technology Center (Also known as Uttarakhand Technology Club) offers following fundamental courses in Information Communication Technology:

- 12 Months program in Computer Fundamentals
- 12 Months Program in Advance Computing
- 06 Months Program in Computer Hardware and Networking
- 06 Months Program in Desktop Publishing and Advance Designing
- 06 Months Program in Application Development

With regular personality development and language skills programs Uttarakhand Technology Club also provided opportunities to students with its Contact Center and mainstream education center.
