= Kathir College of Engineering =

College in Tamil Nadu, India

- Motto: Wisdom Tree
- Type: Private
- Established: 2008
- Academic affiliations: Anna University, Chennai
- Chairman: E.S. Kathir
- Location: Neelambur Avinashi Road, Coimbatore, Tamil Nadu, India; 11°4′6.1″N 77°4′57.3″E
- Campus: Rural, 18 acres (7.3 ha)
- Colours: Blue
- Website: kathir.ac.in

Kathir College of Engineering is an engineering college located in Neelambur Avinashi Road, Coimbatore in Tamil Nadu, India. It is eight kilometres (5.0 mi) from Coimbatore Junction railway station. The college has been approved by the All India Council for Technical Education and is affiliated to Anna University, Chennai.

The Kathir College of Engineering was established under the patronage of Lamika Educational and Charitable Trust in 2008 in Coimbatore under the ownership of E.S. Kathir S/O K.A.Sengottaiyan (Former Minister of School Education, Government of Tamil Nadu) The colleges offers five undergraduate and five postgraduate courses.

The school faced criticism in 2016 when a 22-year-old student committed suicide in one of the school's hostels. In his suicide note he alleged that the staff of the hostel harassed him and te facilities were lacking. The student's mother claimed that no college staff reached out to inform her of her son's death, instead she had been contacted by other students of the college. Police attempted to interrogate several college staff members but they had absconded. In reaction to the suicide, students began protesting alongside the Students' Federation of India and the All India Students' Federation. Furniture in the college canteen was damaged and demonstrations were held outside the government hospital.
