= Regional Institute of Education, Mysore =

Indian educational institution, south Indian regional center of NCERT

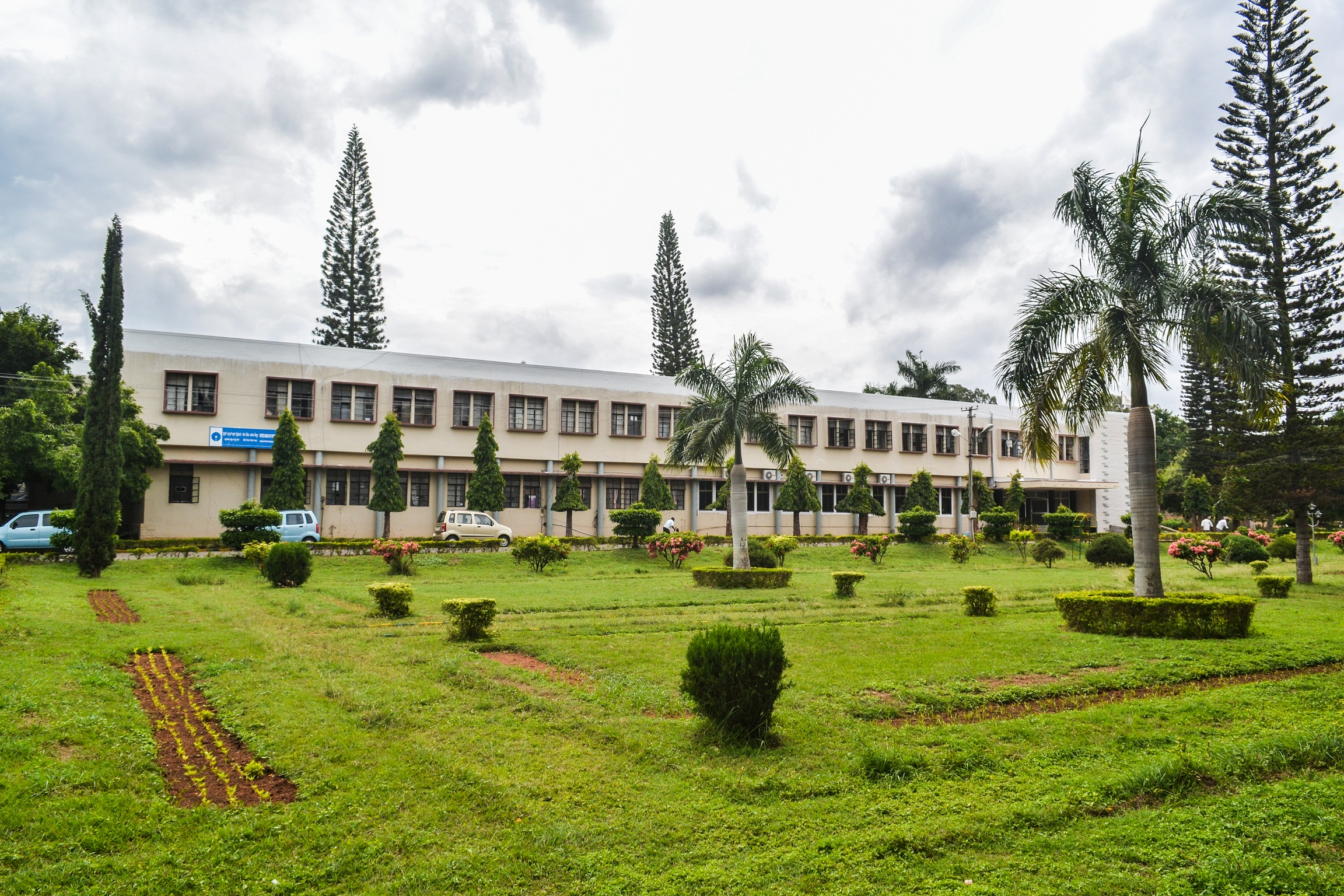
- Main building,Tech Block, New Block, Auditorium
- Other name: RIEM
- Former names: Regional College of Education, Mysore
- Type: Educational training and Research
- Established: 1 August 1963
- Parent institution: NCERT
- Affiliations: University of Mysore, NCTE
- Principal: Prof. Pradyumna Kumar Sethy
- Academic staff: 33
- Administrative staff: 65
- Location: Mysore, Karnataka, 570006, India; 12.309°N 76.614°E
- Language: English
- Website: www.riemysore.ac.in

Regional Institute of Education, Mysore (formerly Regional College of Education) is an educational institution and South Indian regional resource center of NCERT. It was established on 1 August 1963. It was enacted to improve school education by providing training to young education enthusiasts before teaching service (pre-service) and also provide timely training to working teachers (in-service). RIE Mysore provides its educational services to the south Indian states of Andhra Pradesh, Karnataka, Kerala, Tamil Nadu and Telangana and union territories of Pondicherry and Lakshadweep. In-service courses provided by RIE Mysore is affiliated to state university, University of Mysore and all the courses are recognized by National Council for Teacher Education (NCTE).

== Background ==
RIE Mysore, founded in 1963, is one of the five such institutions established by National Council of Educational Research and Training (NCERT). The other institutes are located at Ajmer, Shillong, Bhopal and Bhubaneshwar. In annual report (2008-2009) of NCERT, regional institute are defined as "Regional Resource Centers for school and teacher education". It further extents the definition by defining RIEs as "centers striving for academic excellence, innovation, professional competence, commitment and the sharing of experiences and expertise" for constant improvement of education in their respective region. Even though all five institutes are under the direct administration of NCERT, the courses offered are affiliated to universities near by. RIE Mysore is offers integrated courses at undergraduate and postgraduate level. In RIE, Mysore, The Principal as head of the Institution. Dean of Instruction and Administrative officer work under the head and regulate the academic activities and administrative activities of the institute. The Institute consists of four main departments:

1. Department of Education (DE)
2. Department of Education in Science and Mathematics (DESM)
3. Department of Education in Social Science and Humanities (DESSH)
4. Department of Extension Education (DEE)

Apart from the undergraduate and post graduate courses, a higher secondary school called Demonstration school also works inside the campus which serves the institute to carry out innovative researches in education and also helps prospective teachers to observe, learn and practice teaching.

== Objectives ==
=== Major Academic objectives of the Institute ===
1. Designing and implementing innovative pre-service teacher training programmes at various levels.
2. Conducting continuing education/in-service training programmes for capacity-building of the staff of DIETs, CTEs, IASEs and SCERTs and other educational functionaries of the States/Union Territories in the region.
3. Carrying out research and development activities in various areas of concern of school education and teacher education.
4. Offering consultancy on matters related to school education as well as teacher education.
5. Providing academic support in school education and teacher education to States and Union Territories in the region.
6. Assisting in the implementation, monitoring and evaluation of centrally sponsored schemes in the region.
7. Assisting the States in the development, field testing and evaluation of curriculum materials, textbooks and instructional materials.

== Courses offered ==
The pre-services courses of B.A.B.Ed, B.Sc.B.Ed, M.Sc.Ed, B.Ed, M.Ed are offered to students who qualify the Common Entrance Exam (CEE). Students have to apply online through www.cee.ncert.gov.in

=== Pre-service Courses ===
The institute currently offers the following programmes. Maximum number of students accommodated in each course varies.

1. B.A.B.Ed: Four year integrated course in Social Science and Humanities (55 seats)
2. B.Sc.B.Ed: Four year integrated course in Science and Mathematics. There are two streams for this course, a Chemistry, Botany, Zoology (CBZ) stream and a Physics, Chemistry, Mathematics (PCM) Stream. (40+40=80 seats)
3. M.Sc.Ed: Six year integrated course with specialization in Mathematics or Physics or Chemistry (66 seats)
4. B.Ed: Bachelor of Education degree of two-year duration. (25(Humanities) + 25(Maths and Science)=50 seats)
5. M.Ed: Masters in Education degree of two-year duration (55 seats)
6. DCGC: Diploma in guidance and counselling of one-year duration for teachers, teacher educators and School administrators.
7. Ph.D: The institute is a recognized research center of University of Mysore. The institute offers Ph.D in science and education.

=== Online Courses ===
RIE Mysore offers following online certificate course.

1. Certificate in Educational Research Methodology (CERM)
2. Certificate in Educational Program Evaluation (CEPE)
3. Certificate Course in School Librarianship (CCSL)

== Laboratories ==
The institute offers courses in various aspects of science and education. It is equipped with a number of laboratories for different subjects, apart from that it also has a state of the art computer lab.

=== list of laboratories ===
- Physics - 5 labs
- Chemistry - 9 labs
- Botany - 2 labs
- Zoology - 2 labs
- Mathematics - 1 lab
- Computer - 4 labs
- Geography - 2 lab
- Language - 1 lab
- Psychology laboratory and Physical Science/Biological Science methods laboratory - 1 lab
- Language Laboratory - 1 lab with 20 console
- E-learning Lab - 4 lab

== Library ==
The institute library harbors over 70,000 books on various disciplines. Apart from the books, the library houses for M.Ed. dissertations, Ph.D thesis, all in-house publications of Institute and several NCERT publications. The library is completely automated and uses open source automation software. It also uses Online Public Access Catalog (OPAC). Library is open from 9:00 AM to 7:30 PM on regular working days. On holidays it functions from 9:00 AM to 5:00 PM.

=== Library Collections ===
Total Number of Books –70,000

Number of Back Volumes Journals – 6000

Total Number of Journals – 104

Indian Journal – 51

Foreign Journal – 20

Gift Journal – 33

Number of News Paper – 12

Number of Magazine – 12

== Other Facilities ==
The institute also have a science park, Botany and Zoology museum of specimens. It has two EDUSAT terminal, a branch of SBI Bank, Four conference room and a health clinic with two resident doctors.

== Hostel ==
The institute has hostel facilities too, well within its campus. The names of the hostels operated by the Institute are, viz.,

- Ganga Hostel (for girls)
- Narmada Hostel (for girls)
- Krishna Hostel(for boys)
- Kaveri Hostel (for boys)
- Godavari Guesthouse
- Saraswathi Hostel (for girls)

== Institute anthem ==
Institute anthem was an eight line Sanskrit chant which was edited by then president of India, Dr. S. Radhakrishnan. The former chant mention different belief system. Dr. S Radhakrihnan added on the spot a line which included the names of Jesus and Mohammed. The chant now reads as:

Yam Shaivaha Samupasathe

Shiva ethi brahmethi vedanthinaha

Bhoudhatha Buddha ethi pramanapatavaha

Karthethi Niyayikaha

Arhan Ethyatha Jaina Shasanarataha

Karmethi meemamsakaha

Kristhaha – kristha ethi Kriyapararathaha

Allethi Mohamadaha

Soyamvo vidadhathu vanchitha phalam

Trilokya naatho vibhuhu

== Related Links ==
=== Library Links ===
- KOHA OPAC
- Institutional Repository

=== Official websites ===
- RIE Ajmer
- RIE Bhopal
- RIE Bhubaneswar
- RIE Mysore
- NE-RIE Shillong
- NCERT
