= Coimbatore Institute of Engineering and Technology =

Engineering college in Tamil Nadu, India

- Motto: Light the light within
- Type: Self-financing
- Established: 2001
- Principal: N.Nagarajan
- Location: Coimbatore, Tamil Nadu, India; 10.9955°N 76.7734°E
- Campus: 26.5 acres (10.7 ha); Rural
- Website: www.cietcbe.edu.in

Coimbatore Institute of Engineering and Technology (CIET), is a private self-financing Engineering college located in Coimbatore, Tamil Nadu, India. It was established in 2001 by the Kovai Kalaimagal Educational Trust.

== Location ==
The college is located on a campus of 26.5 acres (10.7 ha) at Narasipuram, 28 km from Coimbatore city.

== Programmes ==
The college offers the following programmes affiliated to Anna University and AICTE.

UG programmes

- B.E. Artificial Intelligence and Data Science
- B.E. Civil Engineering
- B.E. Computer Science and Engineering
- B.E. Electronics and Communication Engineering
- B.E. Electrical and Electronics Engineering
- B.E. Mechanical Engineering
- B.E. Mechatronics Engineering
- BTech Information Technology

PG programmes

- M.E. Engineering Design
- M.E. Communication Systems
- M.E. Computer Science and Engineering
- M.B.A.

== Features ==
CIET is an Autonomous institution affiliated to Anna University Chennai, approved by AICTE, Accredited with 'A' Grade by NAAC. CIET offers 8 Under Graduate and 3 Post Graduate Engineering courses and 2 Year full time MBA program with Functional and Sectoral specializations.

== See also ==
- Anna University
- IoT
- Technology business incubator
- AICTE
- AI and Data science
- UGC
- Coimbatore colleges
