= KTVR Knowledge Park for Engineering and Technology =

Coordinates: 11.20034°N 76.95413°E

- Other name: KTVR KPET
- Type: Private
- Established: 2008-2017 (Closed)
- Principal: P.Livingston Peter Goldwyn
- Location: Coimbatore, Tamil Nadu, India
- Website: www.ktvr.ac.in

KTVR Knowledge Park for Engineering and Technology(KTVR KPET), located at Coimbatore, Tamil Nadu, India, is a private self-financing engineering institute. The college is approved by AICTE and is affiliated to the Anna University.

== Academics ==
The college offers five courses leading to the Degree of Bachelor of Engineering (B.E.) and one leading to Bachelor of Technology (B.Tech.) of the Anna University

B.E.

- Electronics and Communication Engineering (ECE)
- Computer Science and Engineering (CSE)
- Electrical and Electronics Engineering (EEE)
- Civil Engineering (CE)
- Mechanical Engineering (ME)

B.Tech

- Information Technology (IT)

== Admission procedure ==
Students are admitted under two categories

Regular Entry: The students are admitted based on their 12th standard(Higher Secondary Certificate) scores. The admissions are done as per the Government of Tamil Nadu norms through State Government Counselling (TNEA) for government quota seats and through regulated Consortium procedures for management quota seats. The course duration is four years.

Lateral Entry : The students are admitted based on their Diploma scores. The admissions are done as per the Government of Tamil Nadu norms through State Government Counselling(TNEA)for government quota seats and through regulated Consortium procedures for management quota seats. The course duration is three years and they join when the Regular Entry students are in the second year.

== Good placements ==
- 342 offers have been received from Top recruiters includes CTS, TCS, Infosys, Tech Mahendra, Celia Infotech, TVS, Ashokleyland and Reliance etc.,

== Campus life ==
The college offers the following clubs:

- ECO-CLUB
- Fine Arts Club
- Personality Development Club
- JCI CBE KTVR
- NSS
- YRC - RRC
- Photography Club

The college houses the following technical associations

- CENTAURUS – the ECE Association
- ELIXIR – the EEE Association
- PERITUS – the IT Association
- CHRESTOS – the CSE Association
- GNOSIS – the Science and Humanities Association
- ZOROASTERS – The Civil Engineering Association
- MECHSTACY – the Mechanical Engineering Association
