= National Council of Educational Research and Training =

Autonomous organisation for school education in India

- Motto: Sanskrit: विद्यया अमृतमश्नुते Life eternal through learning
- Type: Autonomous body
- Established: 1 September 1961; 65 years ago
- Founder: Government of India (Ministry of Education)
- Budget: ₹510 crore (US$53 million) (FY2022–23 est.)
- President: Minister of Education, Government of India
- Director: Prof. Dinesh Prasad Saklani
- Location: Sri Aurobindo Marg, Delhi, India
- Campus: Urban
- Acronym: NCERT
- Website: www.ncert.nic.in

The National Council of Educational Research and Training (NCERT) is an autonomous organisation under the Ministry of Education, Government of India, with its headquarters located on Sri Aurobindo Marg in South Delhi. Prof. Dinesh Prasad Saklani has served as the Director of NCERT since February 2022. In 2023, NCERT constituted a 19-member committee to review curriculum and learning materials for classes 3 to 12.

== History ==
The Indian Ministry of Education established the NCERT on 27 July 1961, and the council began formal operation on 1 September 1961. It was formed through the merger of seven government organisations:

- Central Institute of Education
- Central Bureau of Textbook Research
- Central Bureau of Educational and Vocational Guidance
- Directorate of Extension Programmes for Secondary Education
- National Institute of Basic Education
- National Fundamental Education Centre
- National Institute of Audio-Visual Education

It is a separate organisation from the National Council for Teacher Education.

The objective of NCERT is to design and support a common national educational system while enabling and encouraging diverse cultural practices across the country. The first national policy statement on education was issued in 1968, based on the recommendations of the Education Commission (1964–66). The policy endorsed adopting a uniform pattern of school education across the country, consisting of 10 years of general education followed by 2 years of diversified schooling.

The NCERT is also responsible for the formation of the National Science Talent Search Scheme (NTSS) in 1963. The program aims to identify and nurture talented students in India, and reward them with scholarships. The National Science Talent Search Scheme (NTSS) underwent a major change in 1976 with the introduction of the 10+2+3 education pattern. The program was renamed the National Talent Search Scheme, and the NTSE examination is now conducted for classes 10, 11, and 12. Currently, students in grade 10 sit the exam in two phases, with subjects related to the Mental Ability Test and the Scholastic Aptitude Test (SAT), each worth 100 marks, tested separately.

=== Curriculum for the ten-year school ===
This framework was established in 1975 and emphasised that a curriculum based on its principles should be developed through research. Thus, for NCERT, the 1970s were a decade marked by extensive curriculum research and development aimed at aligning educational content and processes with Indian realities.

=== National Curriculum for Elementary and Secondary Education ===
This revised curriculum framework was implemented in 1988 following the 1986 National Policy on Education. It encompassed 12 years of schooling and suggested reorienting curricular and instructional materials to be more child-centred. It advocated conducting examination reforms and implementing CCE at all stages of education.

=== National Curriculum Framework for School Education ===
This framework came in 2000. It stressed the need for a healthful, agreeable, and stress-free adolescence and reduction of curricular content. Thus, a multicultural thematic approach was recommended, environmental education was emphasised, and language and mathematics were integrated in the first two years of education.

National Curriculum Framework: The council developed a new National Curriculum Framework in 2005, drafted by a National Steering Committee. This exercise was based on 5 guiding principles:

1. Connecting knowledge to life outside school.
2. Shift from the rote method of learning.
3. Enriching the curriculum to promote children's overall development beyond textbooks.
4. Making examinations flexible and integrating them with classroom life.
5. Nurturing an identity informed by caring concerns.

In 2021, the Government of India initiated the NCERT textbook revision process by setting up a committee, headed by former ISRO chief K. Kasturirangan, to prepare guidelines for changes to the council's curriculum.

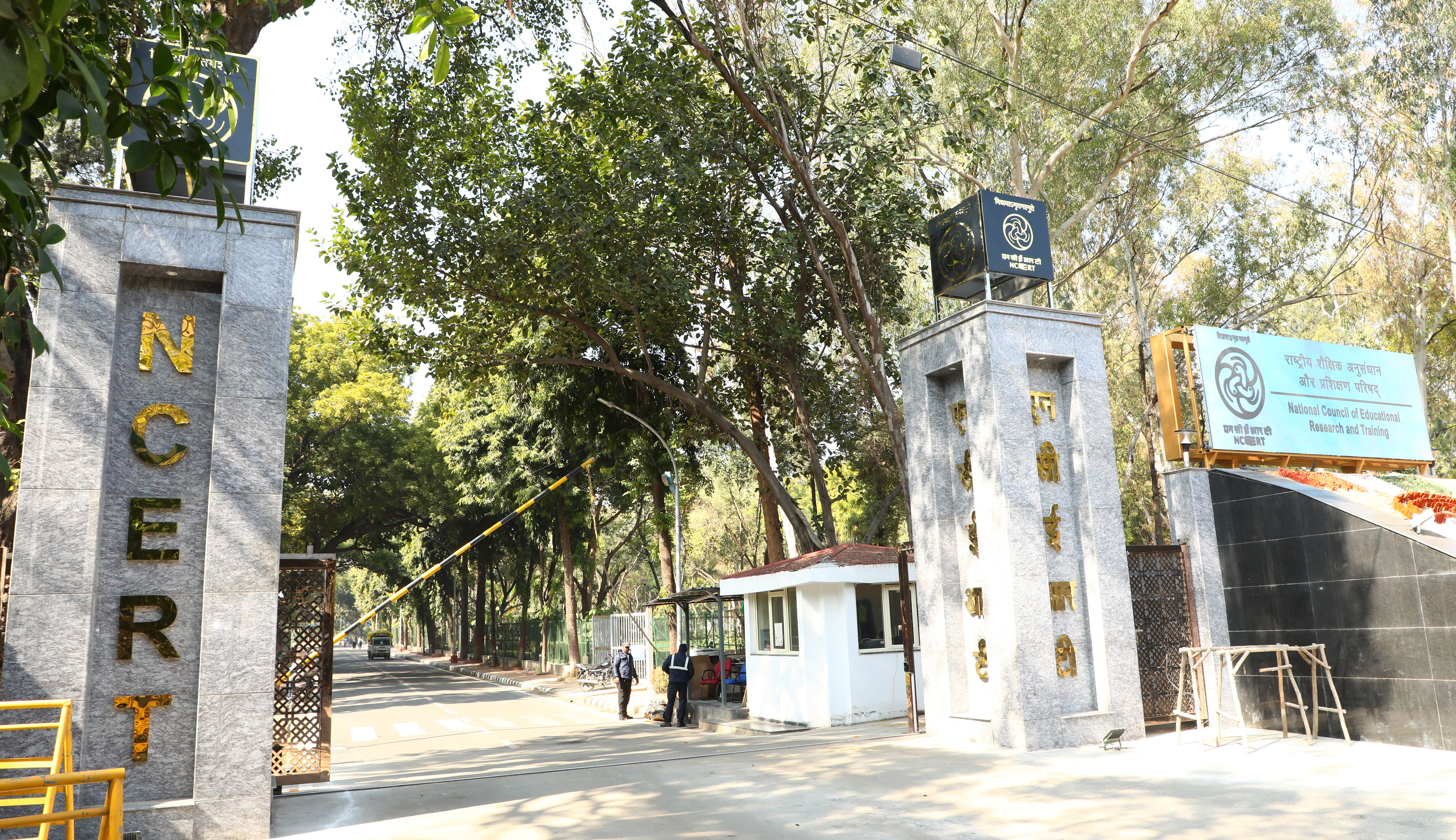
The is newly established Gate No 1 of NCERT on Sri Aurobindo Marg, New Delhi

== Logo ==
The NCERT logo was designed by Manubhai Chhaganlal Gajjar in 1961 at the National Institute of Design, Ahmedabad. The design is taken from a 3rd-century BCE Ashokan relic, found during excavations near Maski in Raichur district, Karnataka. The motto has been taken from the Isha Upanishad and means 'life eternal through learning'. The three intertwined swans symbolise the integration of the three aspects of the NCERT’s work: research and development, training, and extension.

== Textbooks ==
Textbooks published by NCERT are prescribed by the Central Board of Secondary Education (CBSE) from classes 1 to 12, with exceptions for a few subjects. Around 19 school boards from 14 states have adopted or adapted the books. Those who wish to adopt the textbooks are required to send a request to NCERT, upon which they receive soft copies of the books that are press-ready and may be printed by paying a 5% royalty. These are amongst the least expensive books in Indian bookstores.

According to a government policy decision in 2017, the NCERT will have the exclusive task of publishing central textbooks from 2018, and the role of CBSE will be limited to conducting examinations.

In 2021, the National Council of Educational Research and Training published e-books in Indian Sign Language for students with hearing disabilities in classes 1 to 5.

In 2022, the NCERT undertook the task of removing content from its textbooks to reduce stress among students following the COVID-19 pandemic, through a "rationalisation" process based on:

- Difficulty level
- Similar content included in lower or higher classes in the same subject
- Content which is irrelevant in the present context
- Content which is easily accessible to students without much intervention from teachers, and can be learned by children through self-learning or peer-learning

This decision sparked controversy, as some teachers felt that removing content such as the chapter on the Periodic Table from the Class 10 Science textbook was unnecessary, as it builds a foundation for Class 11. The removal of the evolution section of the "Heredity and Evolution" chapter from the Class 10 Science textbook also faced backlash for the same reasons.

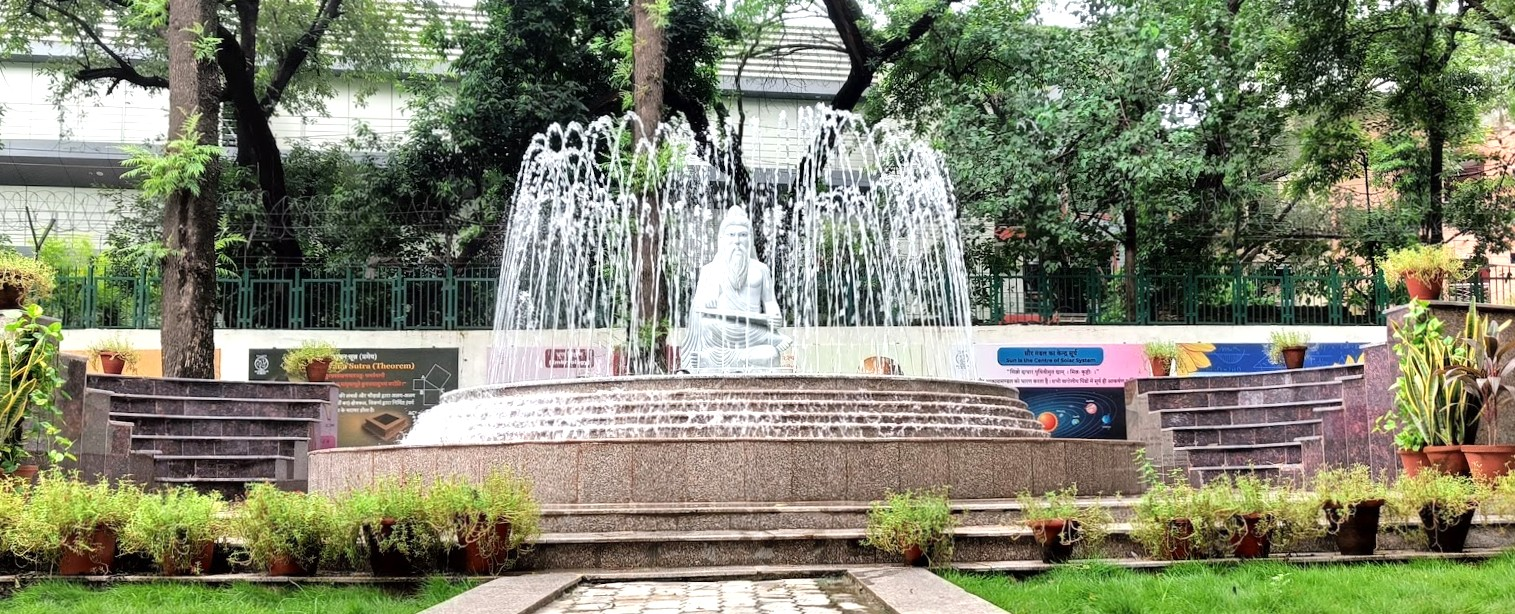
Statue of Maharshi Veda Vyasa at the NCERT campus

== Regional Institutes of Education ==
The Regional Institute of Education (RIE, formerly known as the Regional College of Education) is a constituent unit of the National Council of Educational Research and Training (NCERT) in Delhi. The RIEs were established in 1963 by the Government of India across different parts of the country. The Regional Institutes were established to improve the quality of school education through innovative pre-service and in-service teacher education programs and relevant research, development, and extension activities. The Regional Institutes of Education (RIEs) are located at Ajmer, Bhopal, Bhubaneswar, Mysore, and Shillong.

== Actions ==
NCERT has a comprehensive extension program in which the departments of the National Institute of Education, the Regional Institute of Education, the Central Institute of Vocational Education, and field coaches' offices in the states are engaged. Several programs are organised in rural and backward areas to reach out to functionaries there.

The council acts as the Secretariat of the National Development Group for Educational Innovations. It offers training to education workers from other countries through attachment programs and workshops. The council publishes textbooks for school subjects from classes 1 to 12. NCERT publishes books and provides sample question papers that are used in government and private schools across India that follow the CBSE curriculum.

An online system named ePathshala, a joint initiative of NCERT and the Ministry of Education, has been developed for broadcasting educational e-schooling resources including textbooks, audio, video, publications, and a variety of other print and non-print elements, ensuring their free access through mobile phones and tablets (as EPUB) and from the web through laptops and desktops.

The National Council of Educational Research and Training launched a new one-year Diploma course in Guidance and Counselling, starting on 1 November 2021.

The National Council of Educational Research and Training had partnered with Microsoft's global training partner, Tech Avant-Garde (TAG), to facilitate a Connected Learning Community (CLC) to improve digital skills among its teachers.

== Controversies ==
Since its establishment, the organisation has faced controversy regarding the content of its textbooks. The disagreement centres on accusations of the leftist bias of books written pre-2014, as well as the suppression of the cultural and heritage history of India and the attempted saffronising of Indian history published post-2014.

Allegations of historical revisionism with a Hindu nationalist agenda arose under the Janata Party government from 1977 to 1980 and again under the Bharatiya Janata Party government from 1998 to 2004. In 2012, under the Congress-led UPA government, the organisation was blamed for publishing 'offensive' cartoons of B. R. Ambedkar, the architect of the Indian Constitution, and thus insulting the Constitution in its textbooks. The controversy led to the resignation of NCERT chief advisors Yogendra Yadav and Suhas Palshikar and an apology from the government.

In 2022, another controversy arose when both the CBSE and NCERT removed topics on Islamic empires from the class 12 history textbook and chapters such as "Challenges to Democracy" from the class 10 political science textbook. The organisation said that it was necessary to rationalise the syllabus to reduce examination pressure on students by removing repeated concepts and lessons already covered in earlier classes.

Between 2023 and 2024, the NCERT faced criticism from the All India Peoples Science Network (AIPSN) and scientists for introducing supplementary modules on Chandrayaan-3 that allegedly mixed mythology with space science, including claims that the Vedas contained advanced aeronautical knowledge. Further criticism arose over the inclusion of Ayurveda in biology and science textbooks, with experts flagging overstated claims regarding its antiquity and scientific validity, labelling some content as pseudoscience.

== See also ==
- NCERT textbook controversies
- Indian Certificate of Secondary Education (ICSE)
- Central Board of Secondary Education (CBSE)
- Joint Entrance Examination (Main)
- National Curriculum Framework (NCF 2005)
- National Achievement Survey
