= Sardar Patel Road, Chennai =

Arterial road in Chennai

Sardar Patel Road
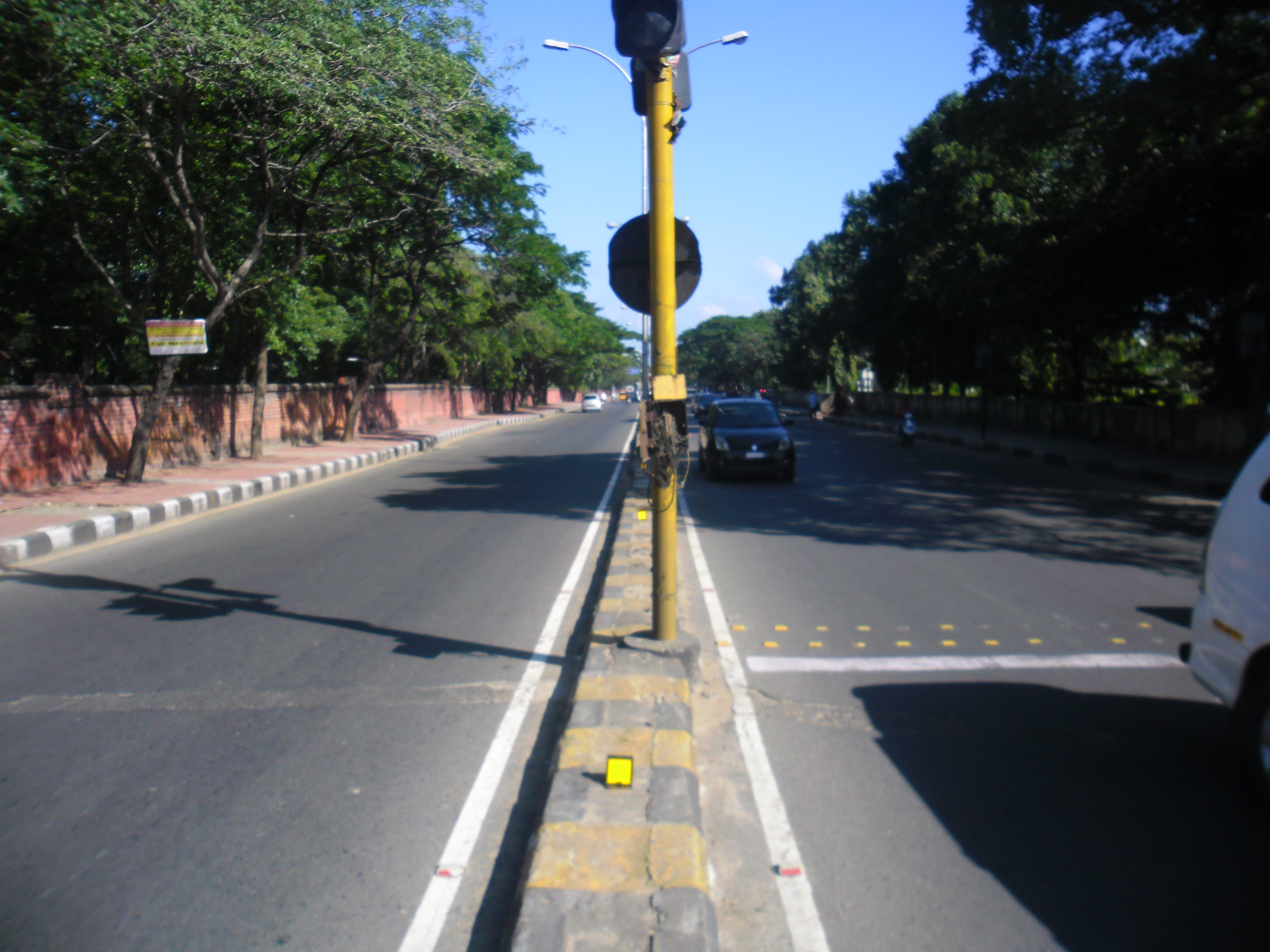
- Sardar Patel Road, Adyar, Chennai
- Maintained by: Highways and Minor Ports Department; Corporation of Chennai
- Length: 2.6 mi (4.2 km)
- East end: Adyar Bridge near Fortis Malar Hospital at Adyar, Chennai
- West end: Anna Salai, Guindy, Chennai

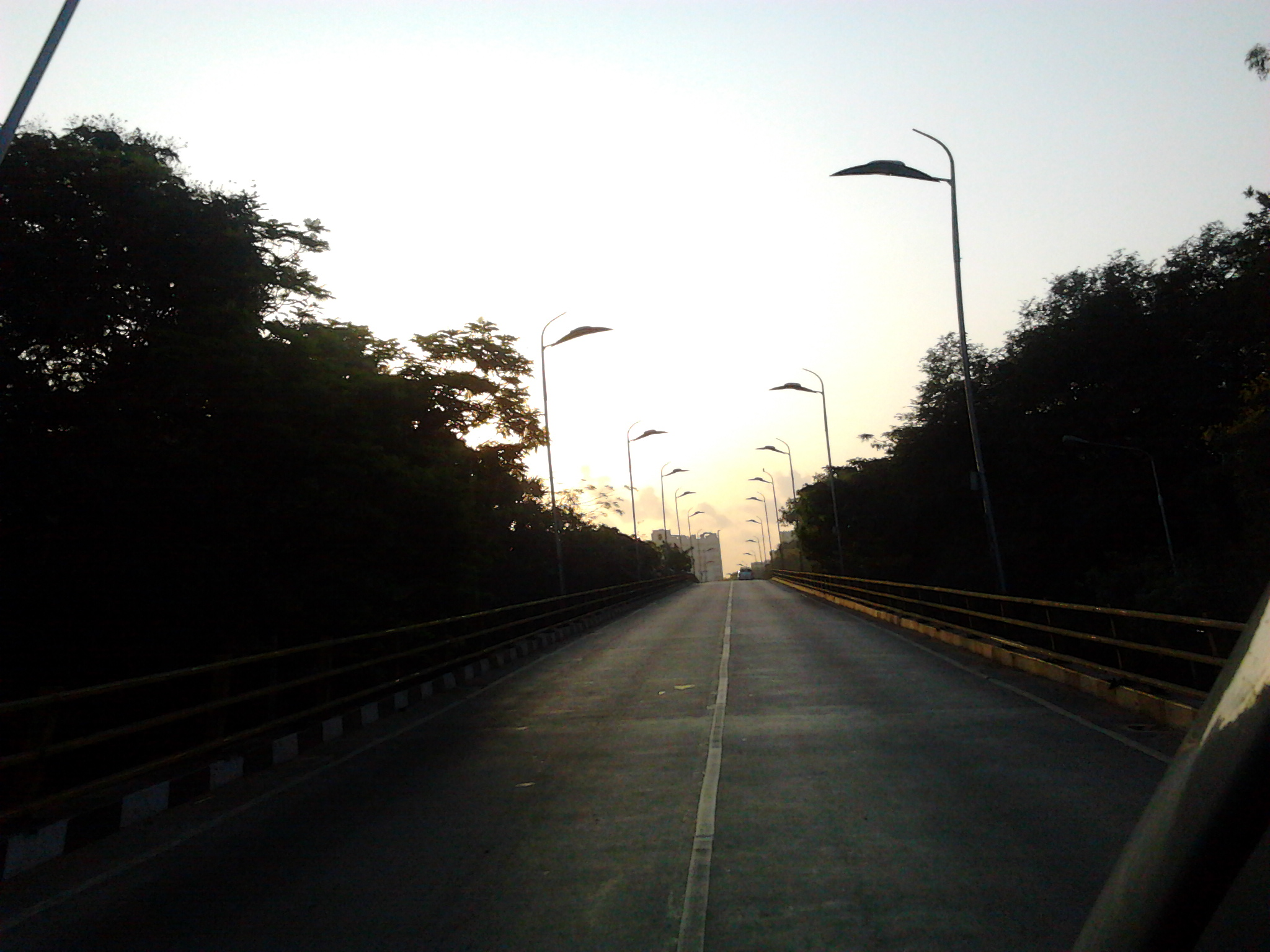
Flyover at Sardar Patel Road

Sardar Patel Road is an arterial road in Chennai, India, which runs from the Alexander Square junction at Guindy to the Theosophical Society gate at Adyar for a total distance of 4.2 kilometres (2.6 miles) from where it continues as Durgabai Deshmukh Road crossing the Adyar River by the Thiru Vi. Ka. Bridge upto the M. R. C. Nagar junction in Raja Annamalaipuram. The Sardar Patel Road is a vital road link for the neighbourhoods of Velachery, Taramani, Adyar, Thiruvanmiyur, Gandhi Nagar, Padmanabha Nagar and Besant Nagar and one of the busiest roads in the city. The road is named after India's first Home Minister Sardar Vallabhbhai Patel.

== Course ==
The Sardar Patel Road traverses some of the important landmarks of Chennai city. Starting from the Alexander Square building junction with Mount Road at Guindy, the Sardar Patel joins the Taluk Office Road from Little Mount, Saidapet at the Raj Bhavan junction from where it runs past Raj Bhavan, Anna University, Gandhi Mandapam, Kamarajar Mandapam, Rajaji Mandapam, Guindy Children's Park and Cancer Institute (WIA) upto the CLRI Junction from where the Gandhi Mandapam Road branches off northwards to Kotturpuram, the Birla Planetarium and Anna Centenary Library being the major landmarks along the Gandhi Mandapam Road.

Beyond the CLRI Junction, the road runs through the Central Leather Research Institute, IIT Madras and Madhya Kailash temple before branching into the south running Rajiv Gandhi Salai at Madhya Kailash junction. Beyond Madhya Kailash junction, the Sardar Patel Road crosses the Buckingham Canal and passing through the neighbourhoods of Kasturba Nagar, Padmanabha Nagar and Gandhinagar reaches the Lattice Bridge junction where the Kalki Krishnamurti Salai branches off from Sardar Patel Road running south to Thiruvanmiyur.

The Sardar Patel Road takes a turn northwards from the Lattice Bridge Road junction and about a 100 metres from the junction, the Besant Avenue Road branches off from Sardar Patel Road towards Karpagam Gardens and Besant Nagar. After passing through the Vasanta Press and TPH Bookshop entrances of the Theosophical Society, the Sardar Patel Road crosses the Adyar River by the Thiru Vi. Ka Bridge as the Durgabhai Deshmukh Road and culminates at the M. R. C. Nagar junction where a branch runs westwards as Greenways Road and the other eastwards as D. G. S. Dhinakaran Road.

== Important road junctions ==
- Alexander Square Junction (0 kilometres (0 miles))
- Velachery Road junction (0.3 kilometres (0.19 miles))
- Raj Bhavan Junction (1.0 kilometre (0.62 miles))
- CLRI Junction (2.0 kilometres (1.2 miles))
- Madhya Kailash junction (2.70 kilometres (1.68 miles))
- Lattice Bridge Road junction (3.70 kilometres (2.30 miles))
- Besant Avenue junction (3.90 kilometres (2.42 miles))
- Vasanta Press Road junction (4.20 kilometres (2.61 miles))

In 2014, the Corporation started widening the road, which is currently 24 metres, to 30.5 metres.

== See also ==
- Transport in Chennai
