= Birla Science Museum, Hyderabad =

Science museum in Hyderabad, India

Coordinates: 17°24′12.05″N 78°28′14.33″E

Birla Science Museum
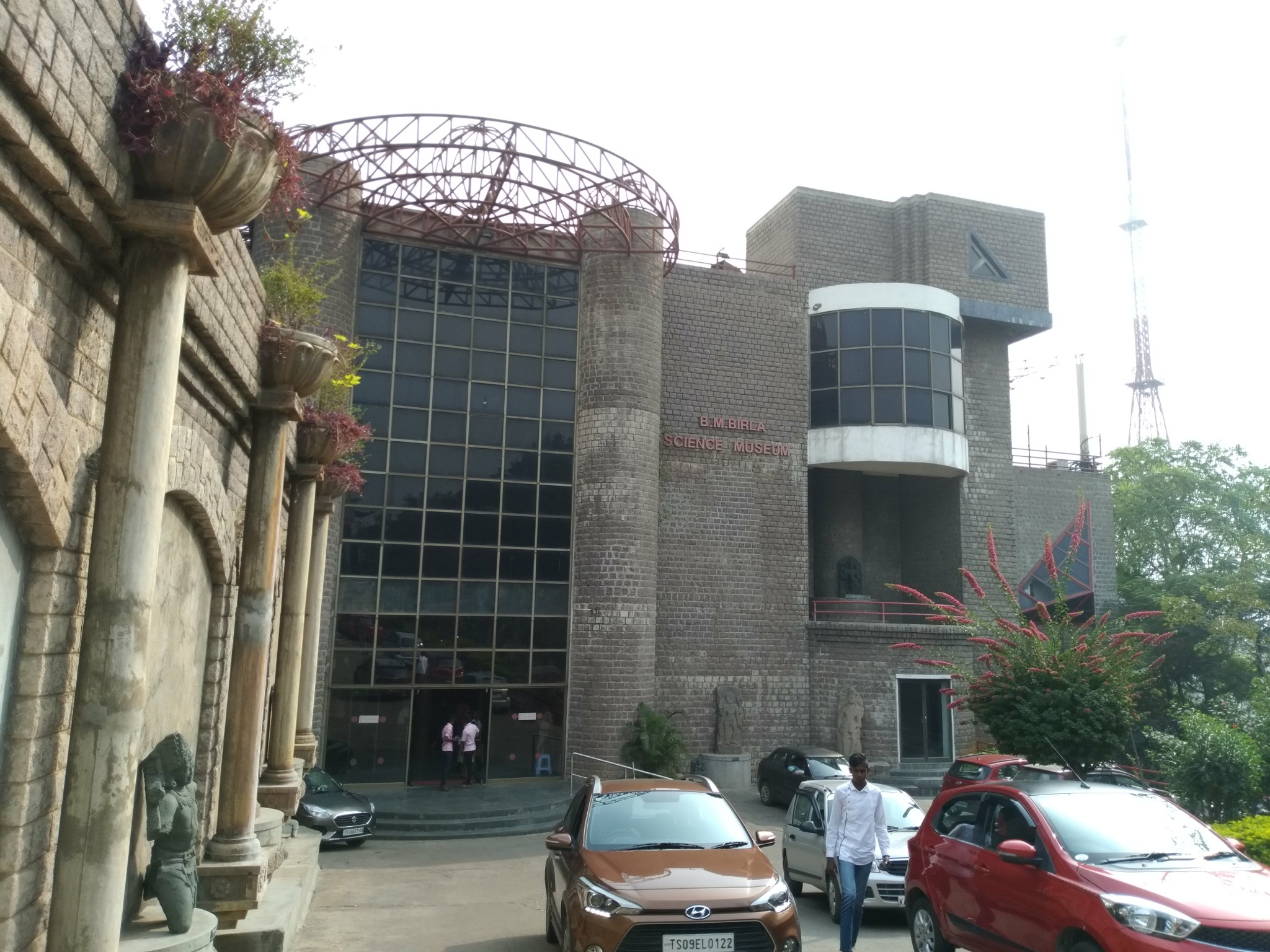
- Established: 1985
- Location: Hyderabad, India

B. M. Birla Science Museum is an Indian science museum located in Hyderabad, India. Constructed by civil engineer P. A. Singaravelu, it comprises a planetarium, museum, science centre, art gallery as well as a dinosaurium. The museum itself was the second phase of the science centre when it opened in 1990. The centre also houses India's first private Space Museum. The museum is a unique facility which is dedicated to history of the space program of India. The space museum was inaugurated in July 2019 and was curated by Pranav Sharma.

== Planetarium ==
The Birla Planetarium is a wing of the Science Centre. The planetarium was inaugurated by N. T. Rama Rao, on 8 September 1985 and is one of three Birla Planetariums in India. The others are the M. P. Birla Planetarium in Kolkata and B. M. Birla Planetarium in Chennai.

== Space Museum ==
The museum brings to light various contributions of ISRO to public awareness through images, illustrations and words. More than forty three people contributed to the narration and which were taken out after some several thousand pages of information and data collected over the span of almost two years by the curator Pranav Sharma. Satyajit Tuljapurkar was the architect of the place and digital artwork was done by Arjun Kota. Ankur Chhabra and Smyan Thota worked as curation assistants and outreach team leads.

There are more than twenty exhibits including the models of PSLV, GSLV, GSLV-MkIII (which recently successfully carried Chandrayaan-2 in the outer space). The legacy series of satellites such as Aryabhata, Bhaskara, Rohini, APPLE and SROSS are also exhibited. A model of International Space Station has been set up amidst communication satellites.

== Dinosaurium ==
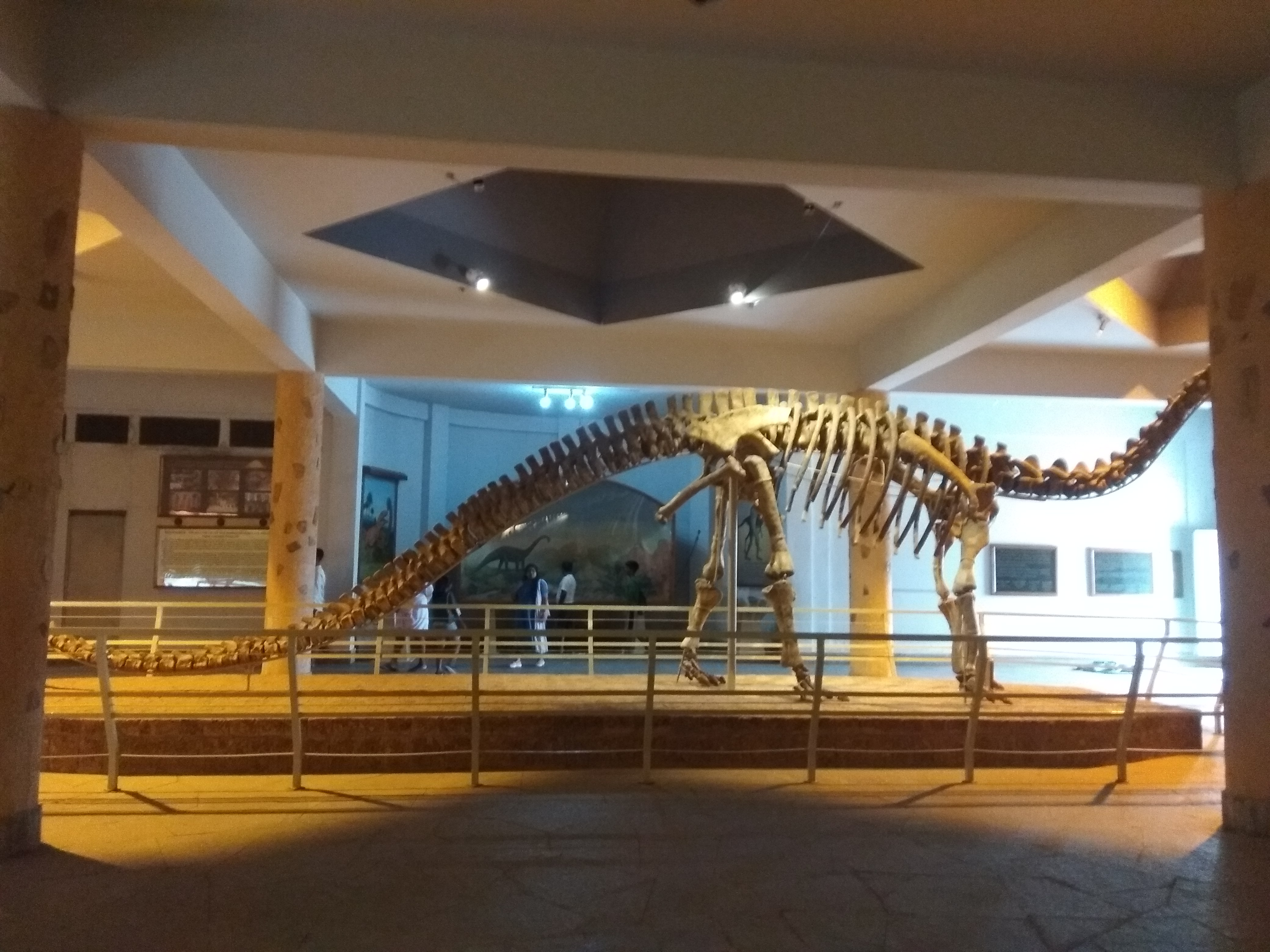
Kotasaurus

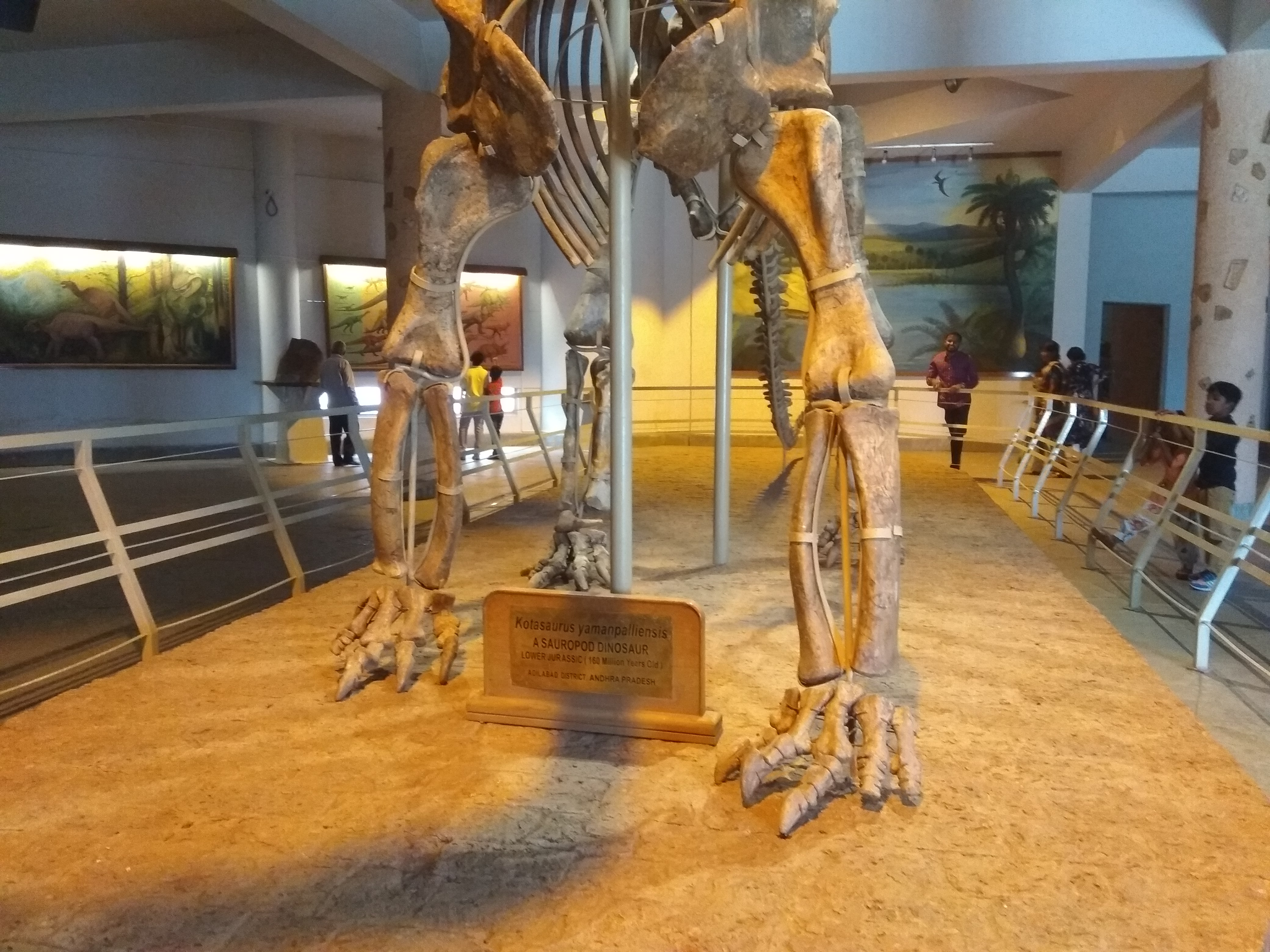
Legs of Kotasaurus

The Dinosaurium is the newest addition to the planetarium and science center and opened in 2000. Its exhibits include a 160-million-year-old mounted Kotasaurus yamanpalliensis, excavated in the Adilabad district in Telangana and presented to the Science Museum by the Geological Survey of India. The Dinosaurium has a collection of smaller fossils of dinosaur eggs, marine shells and fossilised tree trunks.

== See also ==
- Astrotourism in India
- M. P. Birla Institute of Fundamental Research
- List of planetariums
- Nizam Museum
