= Tamil Nadu Science and Technology Centre =

Coordinates: 13.0127°N 80.2438°E

- Established: 1983; 43 years ago
- Location: Gandhi Mandapam Road, Kotturpuram, Chennai, India
- Type: Science museum
- Visitors: 500,000+ annually
- Public transit access: Kasturba Nagar MRTS station
- Website: tnstc.gov.in

The Tamil Nadu Science and Technology Centre (TNSTC) is a science museum and educational institution in Chennai, India. Established in 1983, it operates under the Government of Tamil Nadu's Department of Higher Education. The centre serves as a hub for science education and awareness, housing several major facilities including the Periyar Science and Technology Centre, the B. M. Birla Planetarium, and various specialized galleries.

== Location ==
The centre is located on the Gandhi Mandapam Road in Kotturpuram, adjacent to the Central Leather Research Institute campus. It lies in the predominantly wooded Adyar-Guindy region known as the Green Lungs of Chennai. The nearest railway station is Kasturba Nagar MRTS, located about 1 km from the centre.

== History ==
The Tamil Nadu Science and Technology Centre was established in 1983 with financial assistance from the Government of Tamil Nadu. In 1988, the Periyar Science and Technology Centre was inaugurated as a major component of TNSTC, along with the B. M. Birla Planetarium.

In 2007, the centre expanded with the addition of the Solomon Victor Heart Museum. The museum was inaugurated on January 19, 2007, by Union Minister T.R. Baalu, featuring 'A Journey Through Time' exhibition in coordination with the Golden Heart Foundation, Chennai.

== Facilities ==
=== Periyar Science and Technology Centre ===
The Periyar Science and Technology Centre, operational since 1988, is the main exhibition complex within TNSTC. It houses multiple galleries and interactive exhibits focused on various aspects of science and technology.

=== Outdoor Parks ===
The centre maintains outdoor exhibition areas:

- Science Park with interactive exhibits
- Traffic Park
- Evolution Park

=== B. M. Birla Planetarium ===
The B. M. Birla Planetarium, inaugurated in 1988, is a major component of TNSTC. The planetarium features a 15-meter dome and seats 250 visitors. In 2019, after an 18-month renovation, the mechanical projector was replaced with a hybrid digital opto-mechanical projector offering 360-degree immersive video effects.

The planetarium conducts regular shows in Tamil and English about astronomy and space science. Shows include topics such as the Solar System, sky and seasons, eclipses, Earth, Moon landing, comets, meteoroids, stellar cycle and the deep sky. The decommissioned original mechanical projector, nicknamed "The Resting Giant," remains on display within the campus after serving an estimated 6 million visitors.

The planetarium offers several extension activities:

- Meet Your Scientist program
- Night Sky Observation sessions
- Live Science Demonstrations
- Meet Your Medical Expert sessions
- Science On Wheels mobile outreach
- Student Projects
- Courses and Training Programs
- Foreign Collaborative Programs

=== Halls of Science ===
The centre features several specialized galleries and exhibition spaces:

- Periyar Gallery
- Defence Research Gallery
- Electronics & Communication Gallery
- Ocean Gallery
- Transport Gallery
- Life Science Gallery
- Innovation Hub Gallery
- Fun Mirrors Gallery
- India in Space Gallery
- Ramanujan Math Gallery
- Science on a Sphere
- 3D Science Theatre
- Hall of Nuclear Power

==== Solomon Victor Heart Museum ====
Part of the 'Halls of Science', this museum displays preserved hearts of various animals including whales and elephants, demonstrating cardiac evolution. The exhibition helps visitors understand the comparative anatomy of hearts across different species.

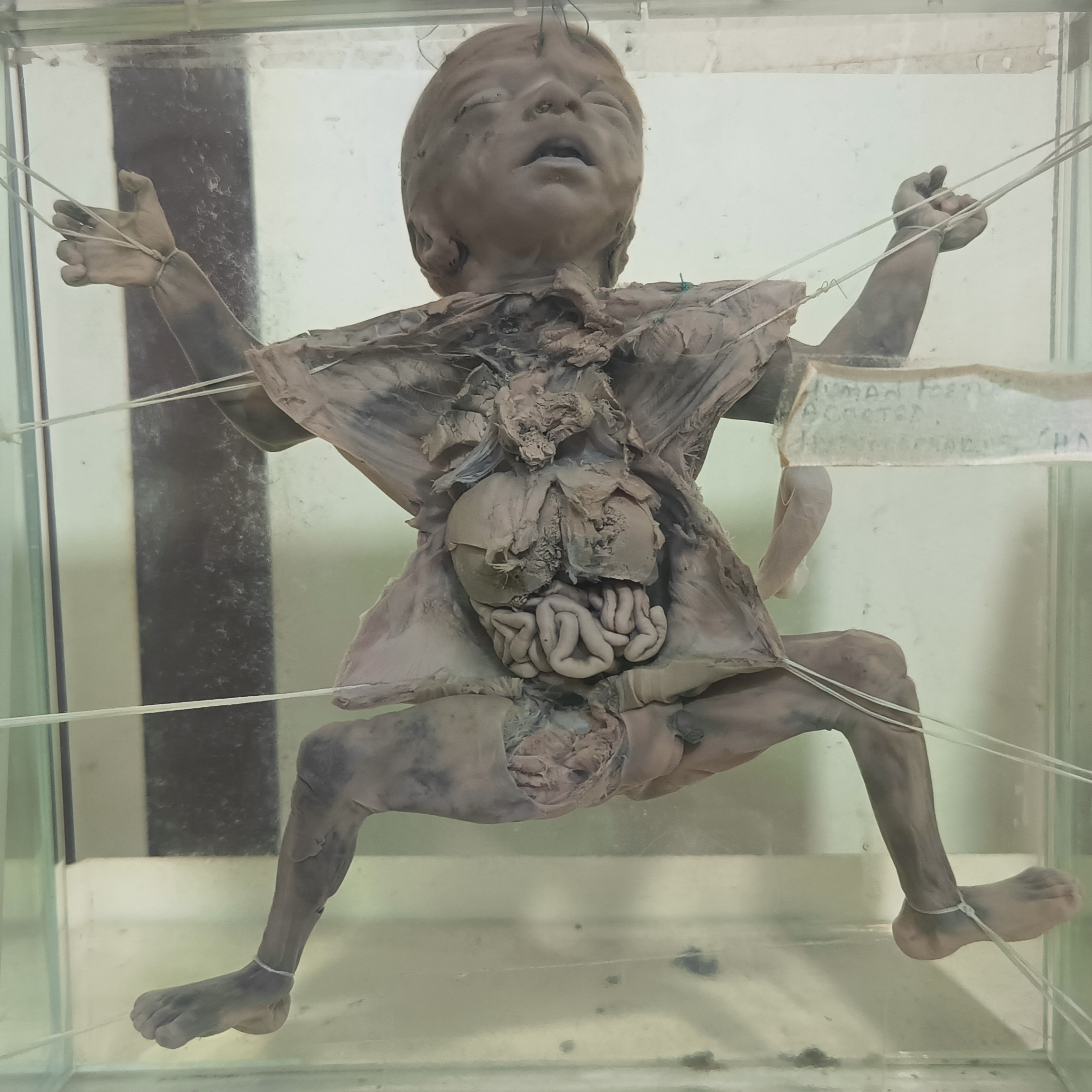
The "Heart of a Human Fetus" is a preserved specimen housed within the Solomon Victor Heart Museum at the B.M. Birla Planetarium in Chennai, India.

=== Educational Programs ===
TNSTC conducts various educational activities:

- Science workshops for students
- Teacher training programs
- Science competitions and fairs
- Regular lectures and demonstrations
- Special programs during National Science Day

== Branches ==
The centre has established branches in Coimbatore, Vellore and Tiruchirapalli.

== See also ==
- Science museums in India
- List of museums in India
- List of science centers in India
