= Birla Planetarium, Chennai =

Birla Planetarium
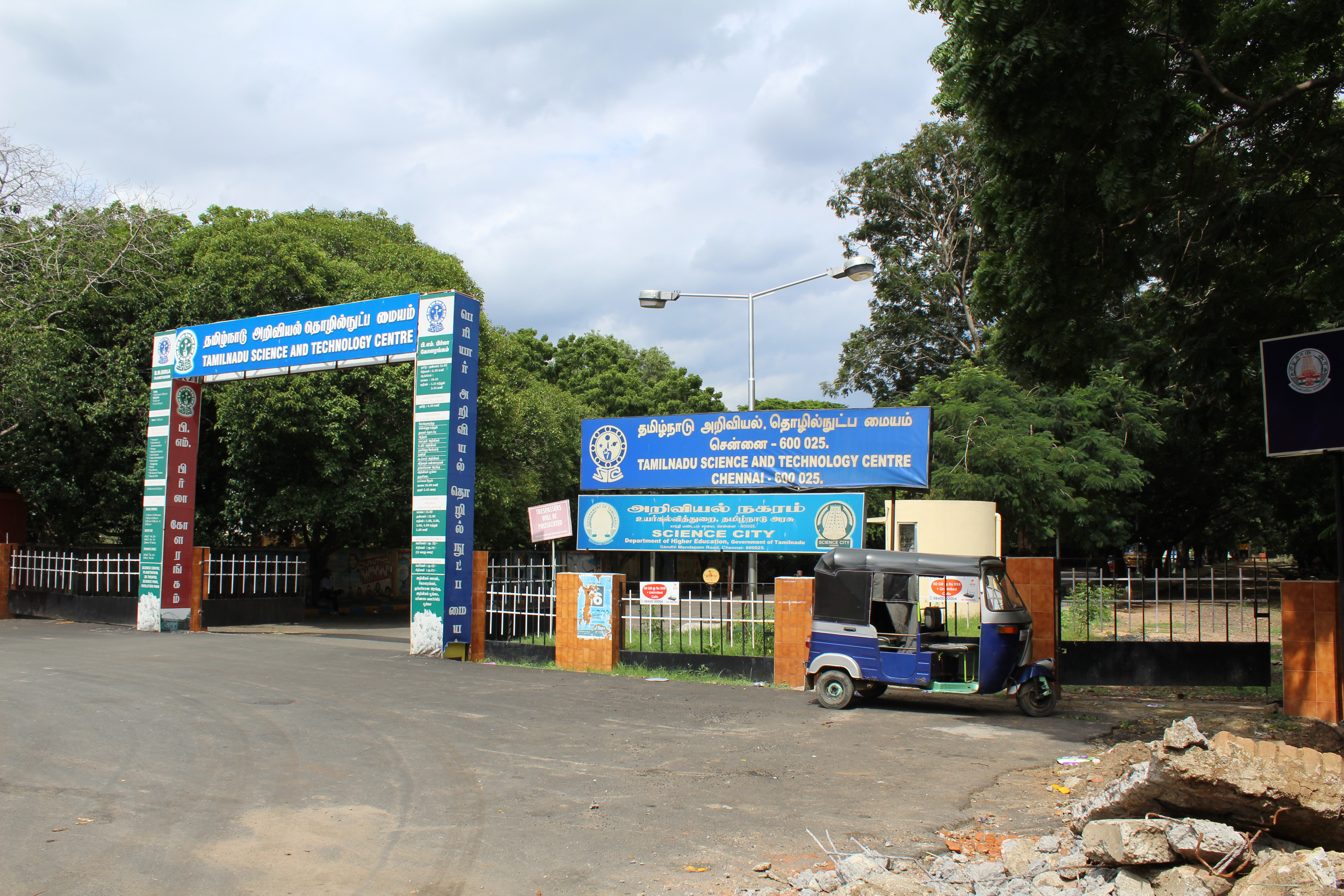
- Established: 11 May 1988; 38 years ago
- Location: No. 4, Gandhi Mandapam Road, Kotturpuram, Chennai, India
- Coordinates: 13.012°N 80.2437°E
- Type: Planetarium museum
- Director: I.K.Lenin Tamilkovan
- Public transit access: Kasturba Nagar MRTS station
- Website: tnstc.gov.in/index.htm

B. M. Birla Planetarium is a large planetarium in Chennai, India. The fifth B. M. Birla planetarium in the country, it is located at Kotturpuram in the Periyar Science and Technology Centre campus which houses eight galleries, namely, Physical Science, Electronics and Communication, Energy, Life Science, Innovation, Transport, International Dolls and Children and Materials Science, with over 500 exhibits. Built in 1988 in the memory of the great industrialist and visionary of India B. M. Birla, it is considered the most modern planetarium in India, providing a virtual tour of the night sky and holding cosmic shows on a specially perforated hemispherical aluminium inner dome. Other Birla planetariums in India include the M. P. Birla Planetarium in Kolkata, the Birla Planetarium in Hyderabad, and the planetariums in Tiruchirapalli and Coimbatore.

== Location ==
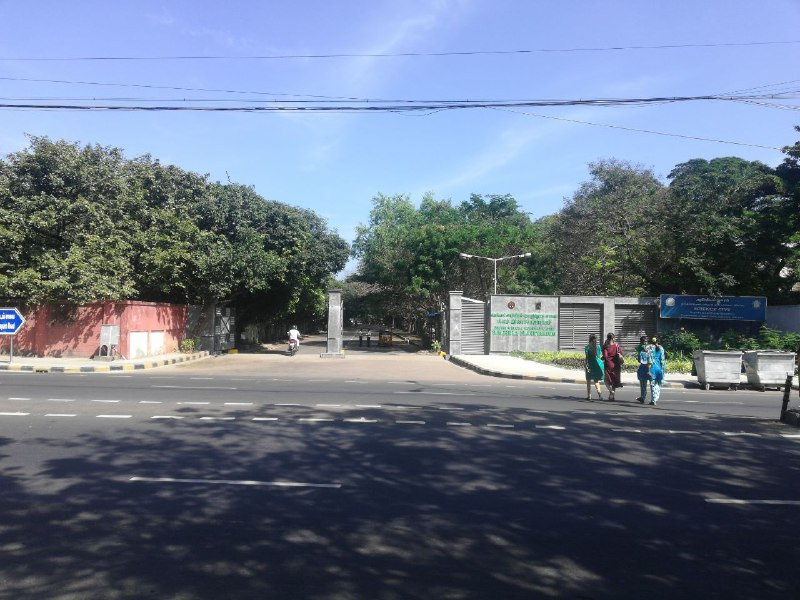
Main entrance of the planetarium

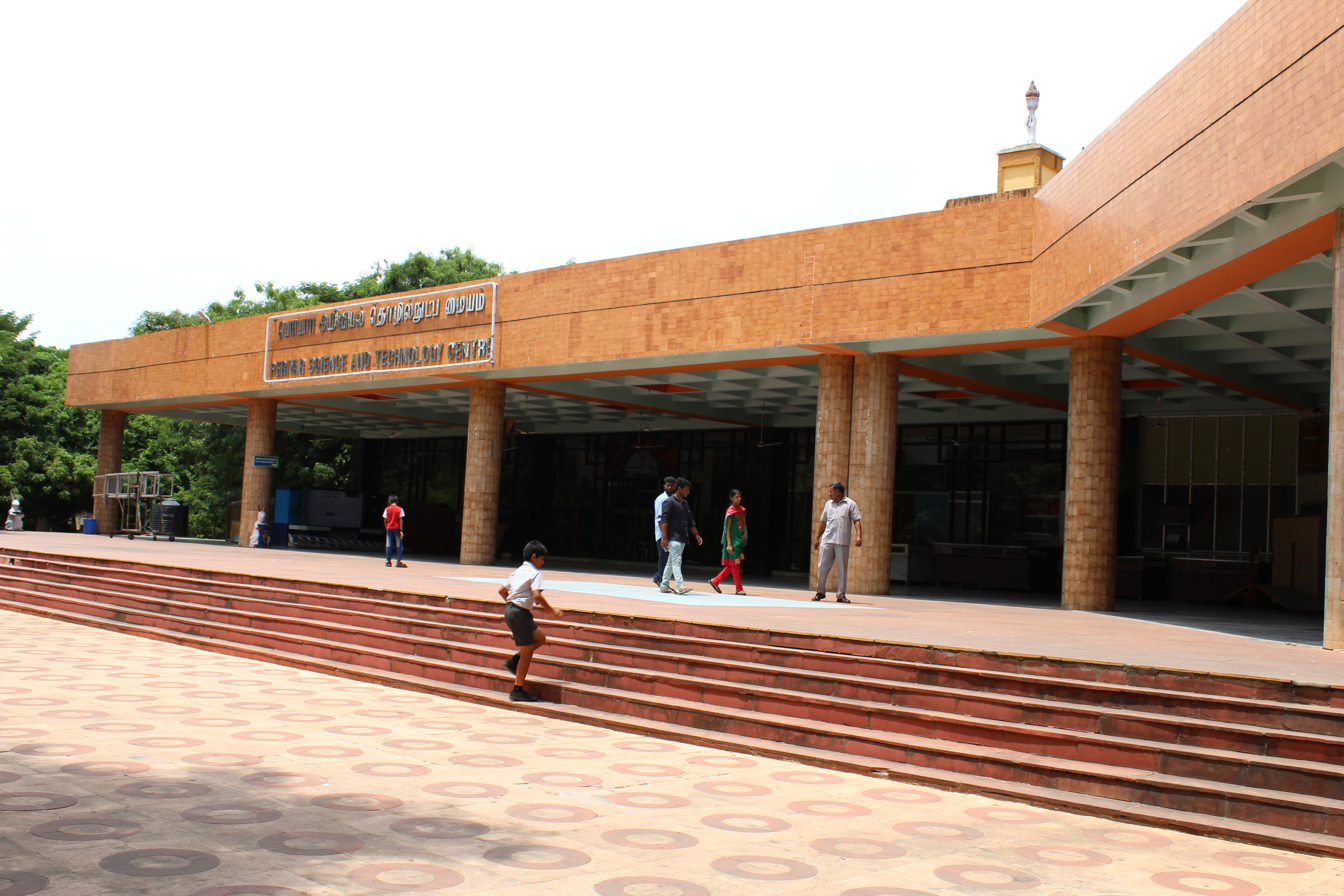
Periyar Science and Technology Centre and Birla Planetarium, Chennai

The planetarium is located in the Tamil Nadu Science and Technology Centre's (TNSTC) Periyar Science and Technology Centre campus on the Gandhi Mandapam Road in Kotturpuram abutting the Central Leather Research Institute campus. It lies close to the Guindy National Park in the predominantly wooded Adyar-Guindy region known as the Green Lungs of Chennai, enabling it to conduct night-sky observation comparatively easily which is otherwise difficult amidst the glaring city lights in the night. Other nearby landmarks include the IIT Madras, Adyar Cancer Institute, Anna University, University of Madras–Guindy campus and the Anna Centenary Library. The nearest railway stations are Kotturpuram MRTS in the northeast and Kasturba Nagar MRTS in the southeast, both located at a distance of 1 km from the planetarium. The Kotturpuram bus stop lies 2 km to the north.

== History ==
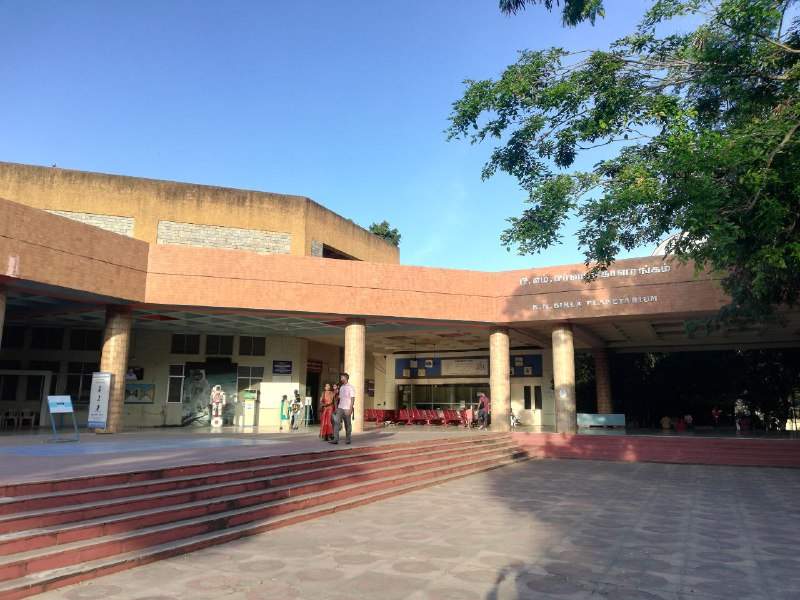
Portico of the main building

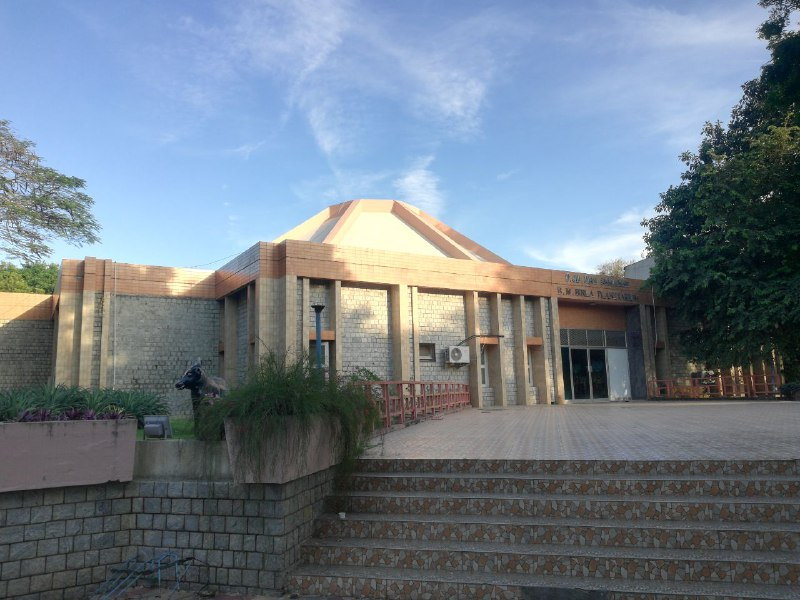
Planetarium theatre house

The Tamil Nadu Science and Technology Centre (TNSTC) was established in 1983 and is functioning with the financial assistance of the Government of Tamil Nadu. The centre started its operations in 1988 with the setting up of Periyar Science and Technology Centre and the functioning of the Birla Planetarium. The centre functions under the chairmanship of the minister of education. The planetarium was inaugurated on 11 May 1988 by the then President of India R. Venkataraman.

In April 2013, the state government upgraded the planetarium into a digital one at a cost of ₹ 100 million. The 3D theatre in the complex was also upgraded.

In April 2013, the Tamil Nadu Science and Technology Centre (TNSTC) announced its plan of setting up a 'Space Gallery' at a cost of ₹ 6 million in collaboration with the Indian Space Research Organisation (ISRO). The gallery showcases the development of space technology in India. There are plans to showcase models of satellite launch vehicle (SLV), polar satellite launch vehicle (PSLV), and geosynchronous satellite launch vehicle (GSLV) in the gallery, in addition to a 10-m long scale-down model of SLV 1.6, kept in a horizontal position, to explain the first, second and third stage of a rocket. A mock-up control room will also be established to explain about how a rocket is launched into the space and the ways to observe the trajectory of the rocket.

There are about 8 staff at the planetarium. The centre has branches in Coimbatore, Vellore and Trichy.

== Planetarium features ==
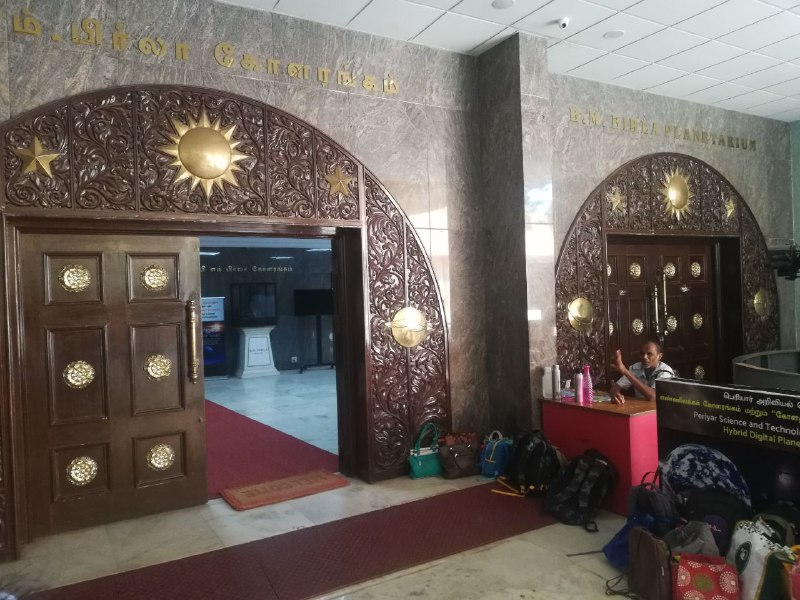
Entrance hall to the planetarium theatre

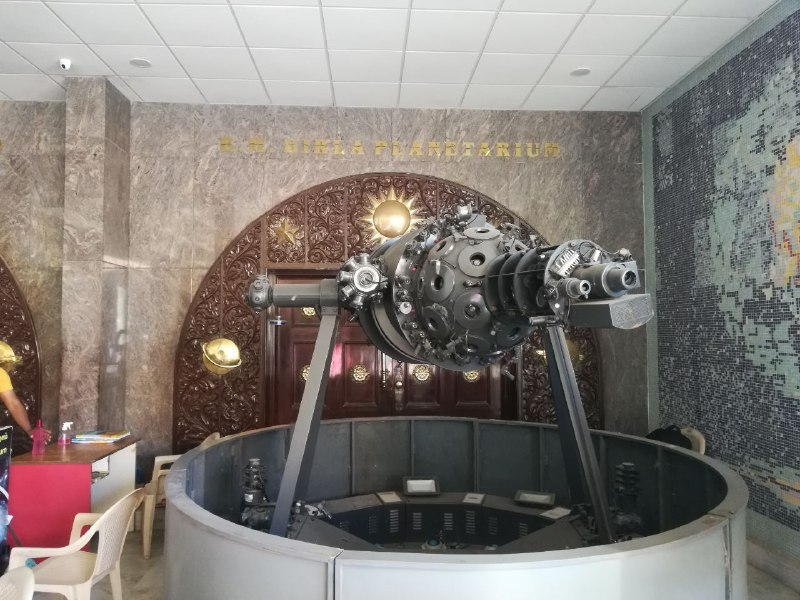
Projector on display at the planetarium

The planetarium is equipped with a versatile opto-mechanical GOTO GM II starfield projector, an accompanying special-effects projector and an X-Y table system for simulating various celestial phenomena. The GM II projector has the provision to execute the diurnal, annual, latitudinal, and precessional motions. The pierced hemispherical inner dome of the planetarium, made of aluminium, is 15 m in diameter. The air-conditioned theatre has a seating capacity of 236.

The total outlay proposed for the Tenth Five-Year Plan (2002–2007) for the Periyar Science and Technology Centre and B. M. Birla Planetarium was ₹ 6.4 million, including ₹ 2.6 million for the X-Y table system at the planetarium.

In 2009, the planetarium established the 360-degree sky theatre, the first in India, with the installation of a full-dome mirror projection system with a DLP projector. The 360-degree effect is created with the help of Wrap, a special software that takes care of curvature correction. The projector was installed at a cost of ₹ 2.1 million.

The planetarium building features a circumferential hall of fame around the main theatre with portraits and statues of scientists and photographs and models of various heavenly bodies, celestial phenomena and space missions. In 2009, the U.S. Consulate at Chennai donated portraits of Neil Armstrong, Sunita Williams and Kalpana Chawla for display in the hall of fame to commemorate increasing Indo-U.S. space ties.

The planetarium also offers courses in astronomy and night-sky observations. There is a seminar hall and a classroom studio at the planetarium, where discussions and workshops are conducted by eminent personalities in the field of astronomy. The planetarium organises a special show on every second Saturday of month to view the night sky from 7:00 pm to 9:00 pm.

Under Part II Scheme for the year 2011–2012, the state government has sanctioned an amount of ₹ 1.5 million for the modernisation of the planetarium by providing six-segment multimedia projection system.

== Shows ==
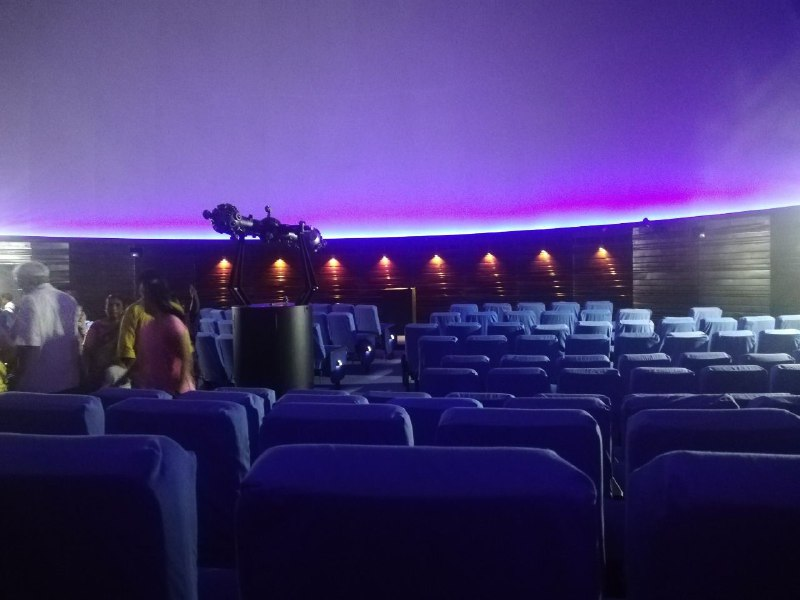
The main 236-seated planetarium theatre

The planetarium conducts sky shows every day at different times in different languages. The shows include the Solar System, sky and seasons, eclipses, Earth, Man on Moon, comets, shooting meteoroids, stellar cycle and the deep sky. As of 2007, since its inception, the planetarium has introduced 35 programmes on these topics. Audio-visual programs on various aspects of astronomy and different cosmic phenomena are also shown. Program themes are changed every 3 months. Shows are conducted in English and Tamil. The planetarium and the Science and Technology Centre is open on all days except on national holidays from 10:00 am to 5:45 pm.

The Science and Technology Centre, however, receives complaints on lack of maintenance of the scientific displays at the science park.

== Other exhibits ==
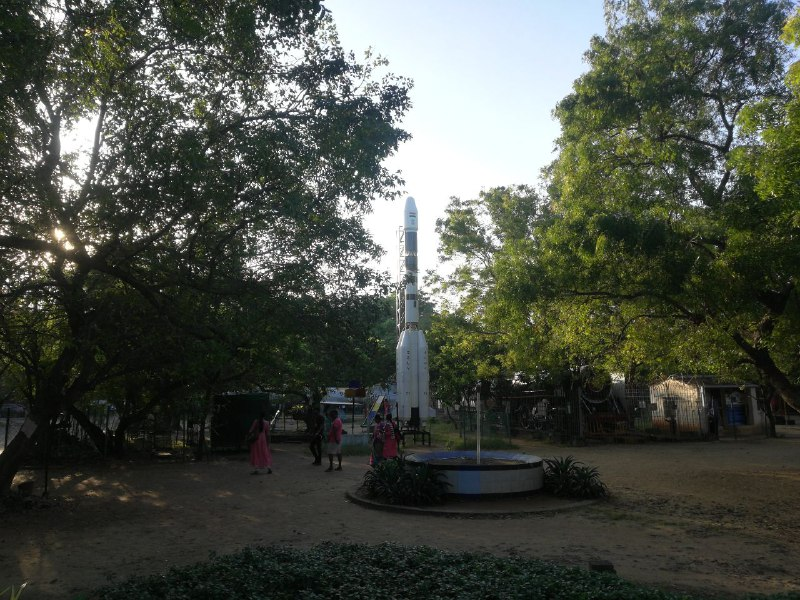
A rocket model at the Science Park

=== DRDO Pavilion ===
In 2013, the Defence Research and Development Organisation (DRDO) began setting up a DRDO pavilion on the planetarium campus in collaboration with Tamil Nadu Science and Technology Centre (TNSTC). The DRDO gallery will have a covered area of 5,000 sq ft built in the existing building, with additional open space made available for large life-size models and exhibits. The pavilion, being constructed at a cost of ₹ 8.5 million, is aimed to showcase the works undertaken by the DRDO in its 50 laboratories across the nation in the fields of aeronautics, electronics, armaments, engineering systems, instrumentation, missiles, combat vehicles, advanced computing and stimulation, naval systems, special materials, training, information systems, life sciences, and agriculture. The exhibit will showcase various models of gun, including the advanced machine guns and AK47s, historical developments of gun, construction of cut-section of gun, scale-down model of Brahmos 1.3, a supersonic cruise missile, Prithvi, a tactical surface-to-surface short-range ballistic missile, Agni, a family of medium to intercontinental range ballistic missiles, electronic equipments, electronic radars, electronic and communication systems, and life-supporting devices. It was also exhibit a model of a specialised clothing designed by DRDO, used by the Indian soldiers deployed at Siachen Glacier as protection against freezing temperatures.

== Renovation ==
The planetarium was renovated beginning around May 2018 and was reopened after 18 months in November 2019. The mechanical projector was replaced by hybrid digital opto-mechanical projector that offers a 360-degree immersive video effect creating high-definition images of the simulated night sky and celestial objects. The decommissioned mechanical projector is named “The Resting Giant” and has been kept on exhibit within the campus. The project which served the planetarium ever since its inception was a slide projector made in Japan that uses 35-mm film rolls. Its show has been viewed by an estimated 6 million visitors.

The hybrid projector is capable of projecting the Sun, Moon, more than 18 bright stars, 12 zodiacal constellations, 26 constellations, Jovian planets and satellites and the rings and two satellites of the Saturn. The renovation also includes an increase in the seating capacity from 236 to 250.

In 2019, a center established a new facility named “Science on a Sphere” (SOS), developed by the National Oceanographic and Atmospheric Administration (NOAA) of the United States, to serve as an educational tool to illustrate the Earth from various perspectives such as agriculture, forest, ocean temperature, and climate.

== See also ==
- Astrotourism in India
- M. P. Birla Institute of Fundamental Research
- List of astronomical societies
- List of Planetariums
- List of science centers#Asia
