= Madras Tramways =

Tramway organization

Trams in Madras
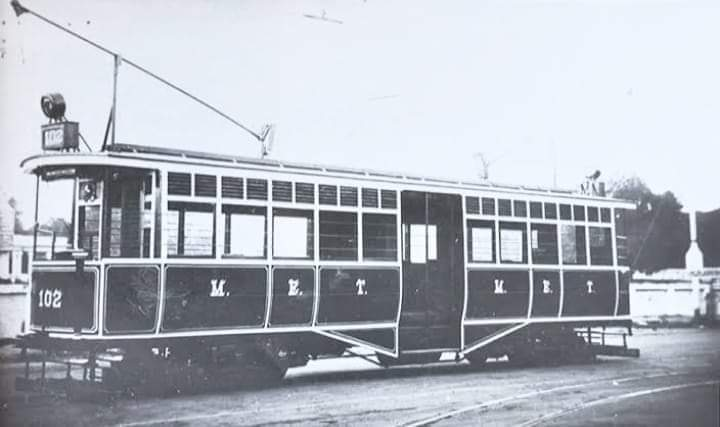
- An image of an electric tram operated by Madras Electric Tramways

Overview
- Owner: Madras Electric Tramways Co Ltd.
- Area served: Madras
- Locale: Madras, Madras Presidency, India
- Transit type: Tram
- Daily ridership: 1,00,000 daily

Operation
- Began operation: 1874
- Ended operation: 12 April 1953
- Operator: Madras Electric Tramways

Technical
- System length: 24km
- Track gauge: Metre gauge
- Electrification: 550 V DC Overhead line, Trolleypole
System map
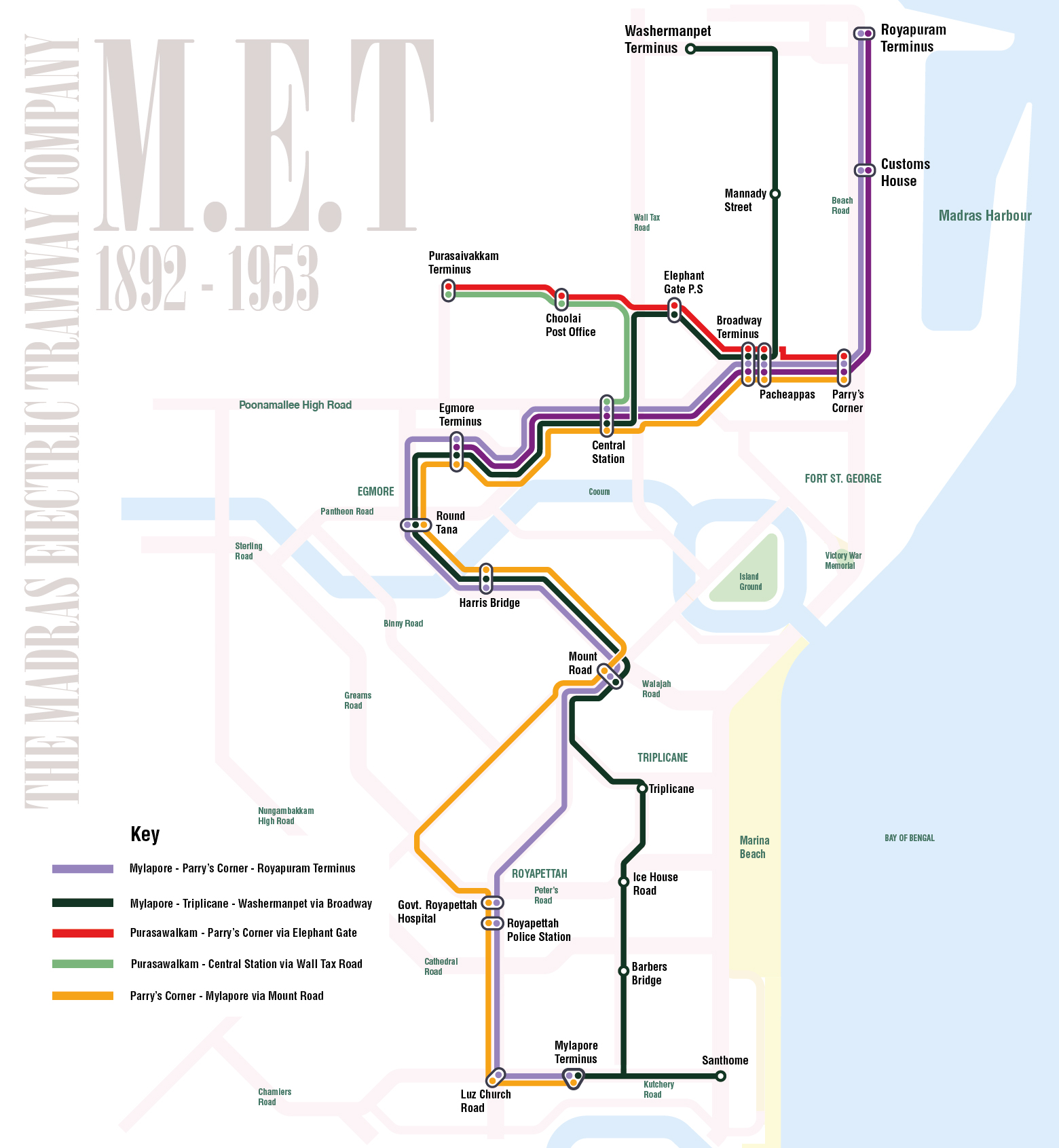

Madras Tramway was the former organization that was responsible for building the first tramways in India in the city of Madras. It was existent in the city for about 67 years starting from the end of the 19th century.

== Proposal for Madras Trams ==
The Madras Tramway Proposals were put forward by the Madras Government in 1857 for ‘experiments for using tramways instead of common roads were being carried out in the Madras Territories and may be used in the Punjab.

It would appear that Madras were experiencing problems in crossing unstable ground and river beds and were developing solutions using temporary tracks.

In 1936 a submission was made from the Government in Madras to the Directors of East India Company in London concerning two projects. One was the project to build a tramway for carrying road materials from St Thomas Mount. No costing was submitted and the Madras Gazette of 4 May 1836 had enquired why this project was taking place. The reply dated 19 September 1838 dismissed the proposal as a quotation was not attached and as there was no savings to be made. The scheme was discounted out of hand.

In 1842 a proposal was put forward to provide a stone tramway to connect south Madras to the outlying districts of Santhome and Mylapore. A bridge carrying over the Adyar River named the Elphinstone Bridge had been constructed about 1840 during the time of Lord Elphinstone, who was Governor of Madras from 1837 to 1842. The proposal was to construct a stone tramway on the existing bridge, presumably to convey carts pulled by bullock and extended over existing roads. A short length was constructed but in 1843 the experiment was abandoned.

== History ==
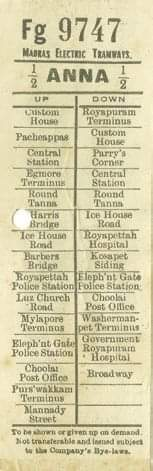
Madras Electric Tramways Ticket with Routes

By 1842 a letter to the Court of Directors of the East India Company requested payment of Rs1817.15 for the construction of the tramway.

In the reply the Directors requested a report from the Military Board on the feasibility of the experiment. In the engineer's report Lieutenant Robertson says the engineer escorted the Superintendent of Roads to review the tramway. A length of stone tramway 684ft (0.12Km) had been built "substantially with judgement. The track had been down 2 monsoons so was a fair trial. It was useful with the public facilitating the haulage across what was in some parts a heavy bed of sand". The cost quoted differed at Rs1539 for the length of track. This meant a calculated Rs11,880 per mile (1.6 km). There was evidence that the sets had moved and over a longer route would be costly to maintain. A suggestion that causeways would be cheaper and more easily maintained. These facts unfortunately put an end to the experiment and the Directors declined to continue.

First tramway in Madras which was many years later in 1892 with the formation of The Madras Electric Tramway Co Ltd. The construction of the first track commenced in 1894 and the first tramway section opened for use in May 1895.

In 1874 a horse-drawn tram entered service in Madras when 11 miles(17 km) of metre gauge track was opened for passenger service. The line of patent modular design was laid by J E & A Dawson.

By 1886 the line was assessed as a dismal failure and narrowly escaped being scrapped. In that year ‘The Indian Engineer’ reported moves to construct an electric tramway. Nothing happened until 1891 when Madras Municipality offered a concession to Messrs Hutchinson of London, who registered the ‘Madras Electrical Tramway Company’ in London on 2 April 1892. The prospectus proposed 18 miles of track to be laid.

== Madras Electric Tramways ==
The Madras Electric Tramway Co Ltd was formed in 1892. The construction of the first track commenced in 1894 and the first tramway section opened for use in May 1895. it was the first electric tram system in India. Its activities expanded in 1904.

The ‘Electrical Construction Company’ of Wolverhampton, England was awarded the contract for construction of the Madras Tramway in 1893, but several problems were encountered. Charles Herbert Gadsby took over the tramway in Dec 1894 and remained until Apr 1896. Trial runs began in Feb 1895 and public service started on 7 May 1895 with seven cars. On 31 May 1900 the ‘Electrical Construction Company’ as contactor-turned-operator bought out other shareholders and placed William Thom as Manager. He turned the business round and on 16 Mar 1904 a new company ‘Madras Electrical Tramway(1904)’ was formed. At this point there was 9¼ miles(15 km) of route, 3 acre depot site, 45 cars. By 1905 the route had risen to 13.25 miles(21 km) and rolling stock to 51 and by 1924 the system had grown to 26 miles(42 km).

Trams in Madras (Chennai) were operated between the docks and the inland areas, carrying goods and passengers. At its height in 1921, there were 97 cars running on 24 km of track. However, the tram company went bankrupt about 1950 and the system closed on 12 April 1953.

In the late 1940s, the company which ran the system claimed a loss of Rs 50,000 every month. The government took over the electricity company and raised the charges, nullifying a 50-year-old contract. On July 29, 1949, the company had submitted a petition to the Minister for Public Works, complaining about the increased charges, and pointing out how it had been carrying one lakh citizens of Madras daily at cheap rates for years.

The letter also pointed out how the company had begun to work at a loss, was unable to pay any dividend and how its financial condition had deteriorated progressively. The government disagreed. so due to uncontrollable losses on 12 April 1953, Madras Electric Tramways co. was closed and to cater one lakh public needs, additionally 50 Busses were operated by the government and finally the tram tracks were not dismantled, later they were being vanished by successful laying and replacement of roads.

== See also ==
- Transport in Chennai
