= Birla Planetarium =

Birla Planetarium may refer to:

- Birla Planetarium, Chennai
- Birla Planetarium, Hyderabad
- Birla Planetarium, Kolkata

== See also ==
- List of planetariums
