= Yelavarthy Nayudamma =

Indian chemical engineer

- Yelevarthy Nayudamma in an undated photograph
- Born: Yelevarthy Nayudamma; 10 September 1922; Yelavarru, Madras Presidency, British India (now in Andhra Pradesh, India)
- Died: 23 June 1985 (aged 62); Air India Flight 182, over Atlantic Ocean, off Waterville, Ireland
- Citizenship: Indian
- Education: Banaras Hindu University (B.S.); Lehigh University (Doctorate)
- Occupations: Chemical Engineer, Scientist
- Spouse: Yelavarthy Pavana
- Children: 3
- Honours: Padma Shri (1971)

Yelavarthy Nayudamma (10 September 1922 – 23 June 1985) was an Indian chemical engineer and a scientist who served as the Director General of Council of Scientific and Industrial Research, Vice Chancellor of Jawaharlal Nehru University, Delhi. He was killed on Air India Flight 182 (Emperor Kanishka bombing).

== Early life and education ==
Yelevarthy was born on 10 September 1922 into a Telugu-speaking family at Yelavarru village near Tenali in Guntur district of present day Andhra Pradesh state in India. He was the eldest of three brothers and a sister. His parents Raghavamma and Anjaih named him Nayudammma (‘amma’ is a short name used by parents while referring to sons as well as daughters, while ‘Nayudu’ in Telugu means a leader). Yelavarthy was over six feet tall.

He had his primary education in the village and studied Intermediate in AC College. Later, he did B.Sc., (Chemical Technology) at the famous Banaras Hindu University and a course in leather technology at Madras Institute of Leather Technology. He contributed to the initial development of the Central Leather Research Institute at Chennai, India. He was responsible for building the international image of the institute and for establishing close ties with the Indian leather industry. Yelevarthy went to UK for further education and he went on to pursue doctoral degree in Lehigh University in Pennsylvania, USA.

== Positions and honors ==
Yelevarthy served as the Director General of CSIR, New Delhi and also as the 4th Vice-Chancellor of the prestigious Jawaharlal Nehru University in New Delhi from 12 June 1981 to 27 October 1982. He also served on many prestigious national and international committees.

He was awarded many national and international awards and honours, including Padma Shri in 1971.

Yelevarthy was conferred with the prestigious Raja-Lakshmi Award in the year 1983 from Sri Raja-Lakshmi Foundation, Chennai.

== Death ==
Yelavarthy left India on 10 June 1985, to attend COSTED meeting in USSR and then the International Development Research Centre Governors meeting on 21 June in Ottawa, Canada. On 23 June he boarded Air India Flight 182 on a plane titled 'Emperor Kanishka', which was carrying 329 passengers. He died in the subsequent mid-air bombing over the waters of the Atlantic Ocean, South of Ireland. The terrorist attack was orchestrated by the Sikh extremist group, Babar Khalsa.

He was married to Y. Pavana. He had two sons, Rathiesh and Ramesh, and one daughter Shanti. After Yelevarthy's death, his wife committed suicide.

== Dr. Y. Nayudamma Memorial Award ==
Recipients of this prestigious award include T. Ramasami, A. Sivathanu Pillai, Nori Dattatreyudu, Sam Pitroda, G. Madhavan Nair, Kota Harinarayana, V. K. Aatre, R. Chidambaram, R.A. Mashelkar, Jasbir Singh Bajaj, K. Kasturirangan, Verghese Kurien, S.Z. Qasim, M. G. K. Menon, Vijay Kumar Saraswat, Prasanna Kumar Motupalli and M.S. Swaminathan among others.
