= Madhya Kailash =

Hindu temple in South Chennai, India

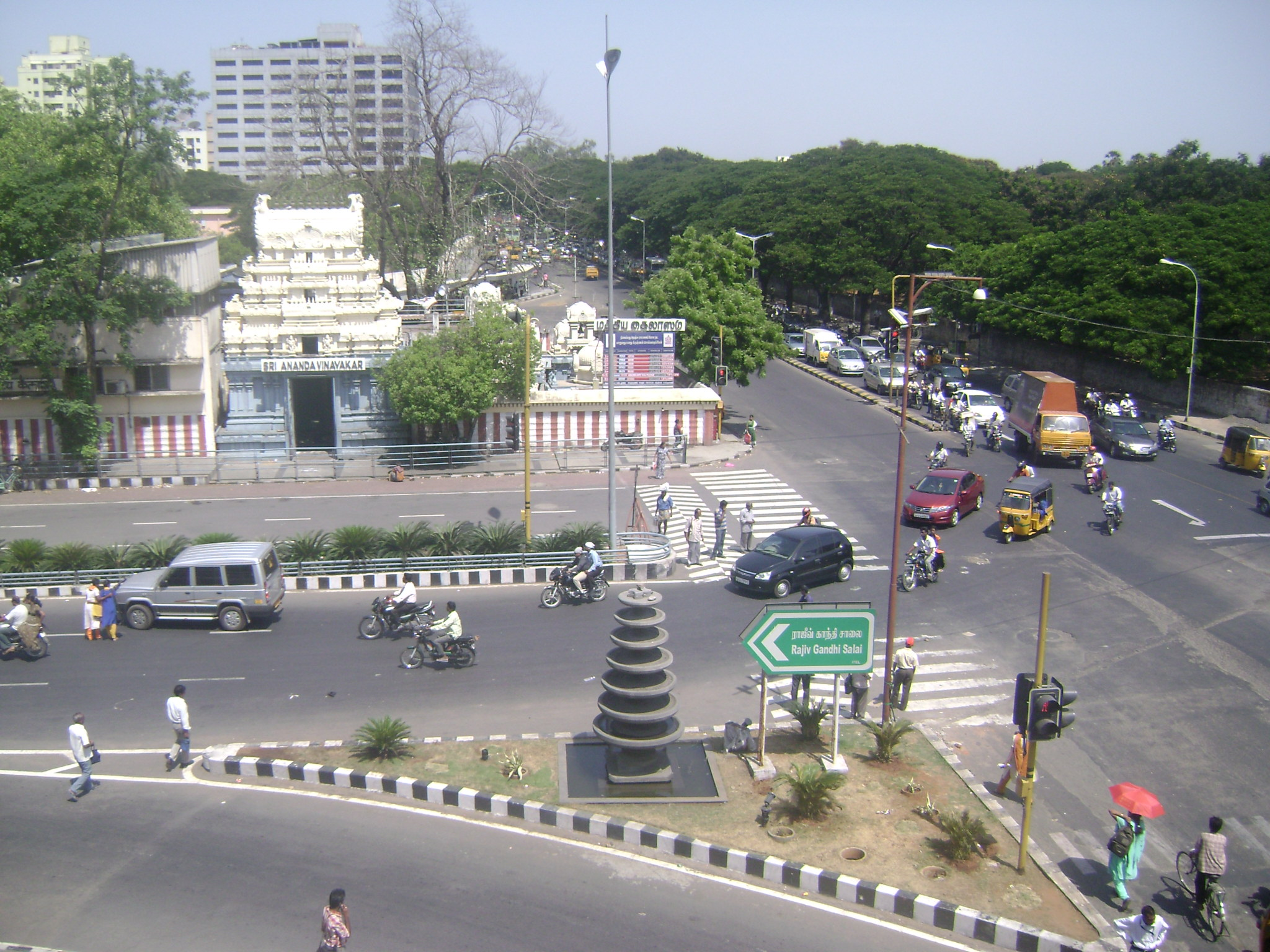
- Madhya Kailash Temple

- Madhya Kailash Temple (Chennai) Madhya Kailash (Tamil Nadu)

Religion
- Affiliation: Hinduism
- District: Chennai
- Deity: Vinayakar

Location
- Location: Adyar, Chennai
- State: Tamil Nadu
- Country: India
- Interactive map of Madhya Kailash
- Coordinates: 13°0′23″N 80°14′49″E

Architecture
- Elevation: 26.63 m (87 ft)

Madhya Kailash (Tamil: மத்திய கைலாசம்), also known as Nadukkayilai in Tamil, is a Hindu temple in South Chennai, located at the junction between Sardar Patel Road, Adyar and Rajiv Gandhi Salai. It is located opposite the Central Leather Research Institute and is close to the Indian Institute of Technology, Chennai.

== Temple ==
The "Moolavar" or main deity, Venkata Ananda Vinayakar, is surrounded by shrines to Lord Siva, Surya, Devi and Vishnu. In response to the wishes of the people, there are also "Sannidhis" to Anjaneya, Swarna Bhairavar and Onpanko, though these fall outside Ganapatyam practices.

Sage Suka Bramma Maharishi and Sage Markandeyan is on the koshtam of the Sri Venugopalaswamy Perumal and Sri Sengamala Thayar.

On Vinayaka Chaturthi day, the rays of the sun fall on the presiding deity, striking an auspicious note. Since Vinayaka is the form of the first sound "Om", eight bells have been installed. They represent the seven notes Sa, Ri, Ga, Ma, Pa, Da, Ni, with the eighth bell signifying the Sa that follows. In the "Mandapam" before the sanctum sanctorum is a shrine to Vinayaka's brother Muruga.

The temple has become famous for its unique idol of "Adhyantha Prabhu", which is part Ganapathy and part Anjaneya. The right side is Ganesh and the left Hanuman. The idol was crafted after a vision of such a form was seen by one of the temple officials. In Maharashtra style, one can light the camphor to this deity himself, giving a great sense of satisfaction. Lord Vinayaka himself takes on the onus of propitiating the ancestors. Every afternoon, the priest has a bath and in his wet clothes begins the rites. He takes the Darba garb, earlier placed at the Anandavinayaka idol's feet and goes to the shrine of Lord Vishnu. From there he takes the white rice offered to the Lord and comes to the Siva shrine. There the rice transforms into the "Pindam". The rice "Pindam" is taken from the Surya shrine and offered to the crows on a platform. All people can avail this service.
