= Palanisamy Thanikaivelan =

Indian leather and materials scientist

- Born: India
- Education: Anna University (BTech); Anna University (MTech); Anna University (PhD)
- Known for: Ground breaking research and commercialization of Do-Only cleaner leather processing methodologies
- Awards: Young Scientist in Engineering Sciences (2006)
- Scientific career
- Fields: Leather Technology, Advanced Materials
- Doctoral advisor: J. Raghava Rao

Palanisamy Thanikaivelan is a leather technologist and material scientist. He joined the Central Leather Research Institute in Chennai, India in 2002 and currently working as the Chief Scientist. In 2006, he won the Young Scientist and Young Engineer Awards from Council of Scientific and Industrial Research and Indian National Academy of Engineering for his work on innovative and cleaner zero discharge tanning methods. He is a Young Associate of the Indian Academy of Sciences and Indian National Academy of Engineering.

== Education and career ==
Palanisamy Thanikaivelan earned his PhD from the Anna University while working at the Central Leather Research Institute in 2003. He founded the Advanced Materials lab at the institution in 2016.

== Research ==
Palanisamy Thanikaivelan conducts research in the area of cleaner leather processing and emerged as a significant contributor in the interdisciplinary area of advanced materials science.

His technological contributions to the leather industry by way of Do-Ecology solutions developed on first principles are widely appreciated. He found that complete transformation of chemical to biocatalytic processing is feasible thereby allowing the integration of narrow pH chrome tanning methodologies. He designed new synthetic protocols for self-doped carbon nanostructures from collagen wastes with potential applications in energy engineering. He aims to develop high value products from raw hide trimmings and shaving dust which are posing problems as solid wastes in leather sector.

He was part of the team of scientists who patented the process for game-changing waterless chrome tanning technology. This process was patented in 2016 in India and other leather making nations. The waterless chrome tanning technology is a paradigm shift adopted in at least 180 tanneries in the country as an industrial practice and also in a tannery in Egypt.

His important contribution in recent years was the development of path-breaking technologies on “Leather-like materials from agro-wastes”, which are transferred to two start-up companies.

== Awards and honors ==
- INAE Best PhD Thesis Award (2004)
- CSIR Young Scientist Award (2006)
- INAE Young Engineer Award (2006)
- Young Associate of the Indian Academy of Sciences (2007)
- Young Associate of the Indian National Academy of Engineering (2013)
- CSIR Diamond Jubilee Technology Award (CDJTA) (2016)
- VASVIK Industrial Research Award (2021)
- Editorial board member of the J. Amer. Leather Chem. Assoc.

== Selected publications ==
- P. Thanikaivelan, J. Raghava Rao, Balachandran Unni Nair and T Ramasami. "Zero discharge tanning: A shift from chemical to biocatalytic leather processing." Environ. Sci. Technol. 36 (2002): 4187–4194.
- P. Thanikaivelan, J. Raghava Rao, Balachandran Unni Nair and T Ramasami. "Progress and recent trends in biotechnological methods for leather processing." Trends Biotechnol. 22 (2004): 181–188.
- B.K. Gupta, P. Thanikaivelan, et al. "Optical bifunctionality of europium-complexed luminescent graphene nanosheets." Nano Lett. 11 (2011): 5227–5233.
- M. Ashokkumar, et al. "Transforming collagen wastes into doped nanocarbons for sustainable energy applications." Green Chem. 14 (2012): 1689–1695.
- K. Cheirmadurai and P. Thanikaivelan. "Bioengineered hybrid collagen scaffold tethered with silver-catechin nanocomposite modulates angiogenesis and TGF-β towards scar-less healing in chronic deep second degree infected burns." Adv. Healthcare Mater. 9 (2020): 2000247.
