= Thirumalachari Ramasami =

Indian civil servant

Dr. Thirumalachari Ramasami
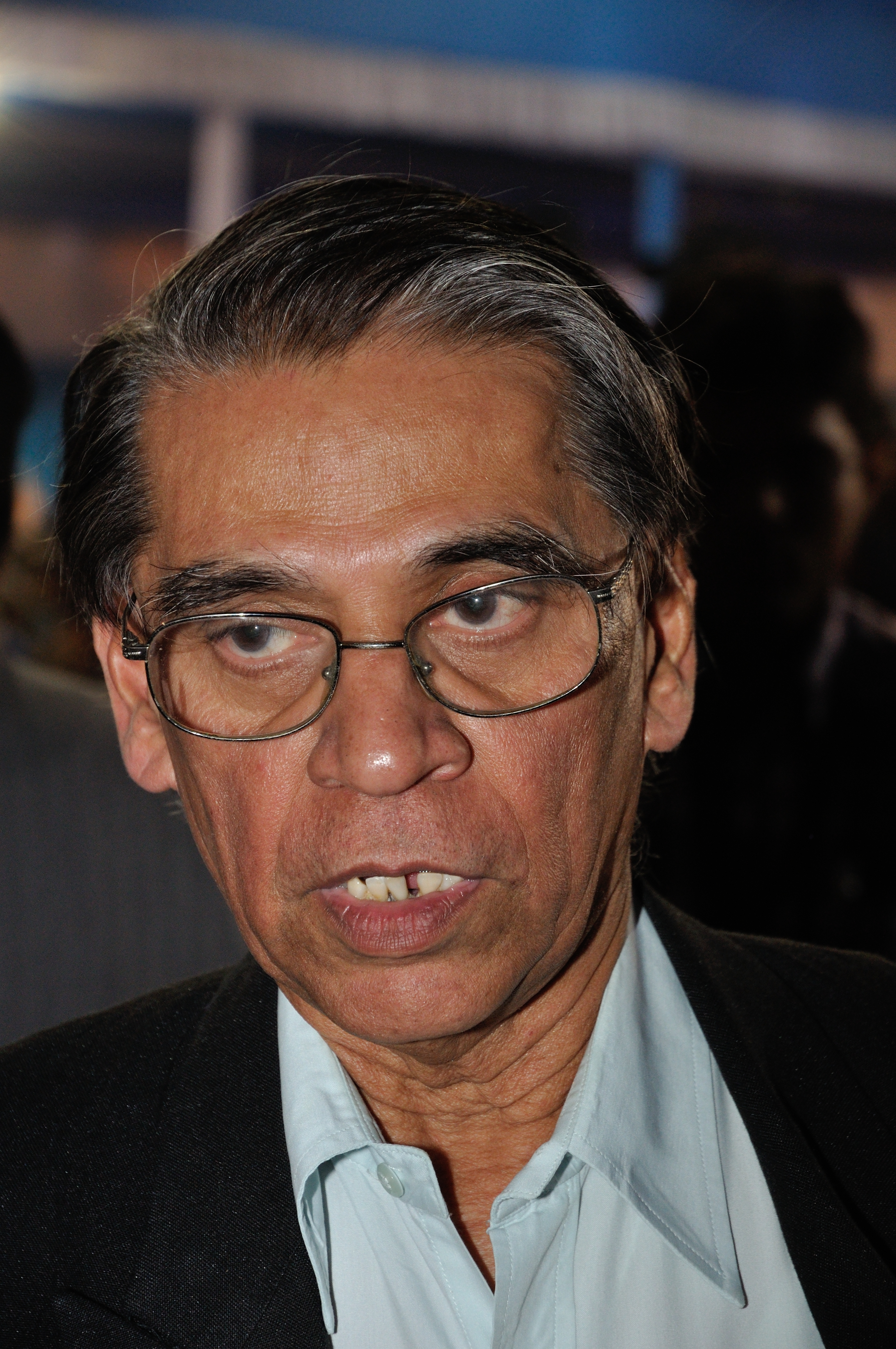
- Dr. Ramasami at the 100th Indian Science Congress, Kolkata.

Indian Science & Technology Secretary
- In office May 2006 – 5 May 2014

Personal details
- Born: 15 April 1948 (age 78)
- Occupation: Scientist
- Awards: Padma Shri 2001; Padma Bhushan 2014

Thirumalachari Ramasami is a former Indian science and technology secretary. He assumed charge in May 2006. Prior to this assignment, he served as the director of the Central Leather Research Institute, Chennai, India. He is a distinguished researcher and leather scientist. He was awarded India's National Civilian Honour the Padma Shri for excellence in Science and Engineering in 2001 and the Padma Bhushan in 2014. He was awarded the Shanti Swarup Bhatnagar Award, the highest award for science in India, for notable and outstanding research in Chemical Sciences in 1993.

== Education ==
He graduated in Secondary School Leaving Certificate (SSLC) from G.S. Hindu High School, Srivilliputtur in 1963, Pre-University from St.Joseph's College, Trichy in 1964, Bachelor and Master of Technology in Leather Technology from the University of Madras in 1969 and 1972, respectively with first rank and Doctor of Philosophy in Chemistry from the University of Leeds, England in January 1976.

== Career ==
=== Research ===
He carried out postdoctoral research in energy at the Ames Laboratory, Iowa State University USA during 1978–80 and on electron transport phenomena at Wayne State University, Detroit, USA during 1981–83. He was a visiting Fellow at University of Newcastle upon Tyne during 1983–84.

He holds 37 patents of which 12 have been commercialised. He has authored more than 220 research publications, eight chapters in books, and numerous general articles.

=== Director of CLRI ===
He came back to India in 1984 and joined as an assistant director of the Central Leather Research Institute, the world's largest leather research institute.(He said in an interview to RSTV (programme name is "Eureka") that one's achievements should be socially recognised and this can be well achieved on your motherland.) As Director of CLRI, he prepared a vision document for CLRI – CLRI Vision 2005, directed the Leather Technology Mission with 170 projects in 17 states of India, reengineering CLRI, new models for development and measures for collective decision making. Led CLRI in providing cleaner tanning technology options for a group of 764 tanneries in a record time of 12 months. Led the Indian initiative in forecasting colours for Modeurop Congress gaining India, a niche status in the fashion world. India is now preparing the shade card for the world. Galvanized and led CLRI in a growth path since 1996 in the capacity as director. Prepared a vision, mission and action document for leading the growth of CLRI and gaining for India global leadership in leather by way of original publications, IPR generation and technologies delivered. He helped CLRI register a meaningful outcome on Indian Leather Sector during 1996–2004. Dramatic increases in outputs of CLRI have been registered during the Directorship since 1996.

=== Department of Science and Technology ===
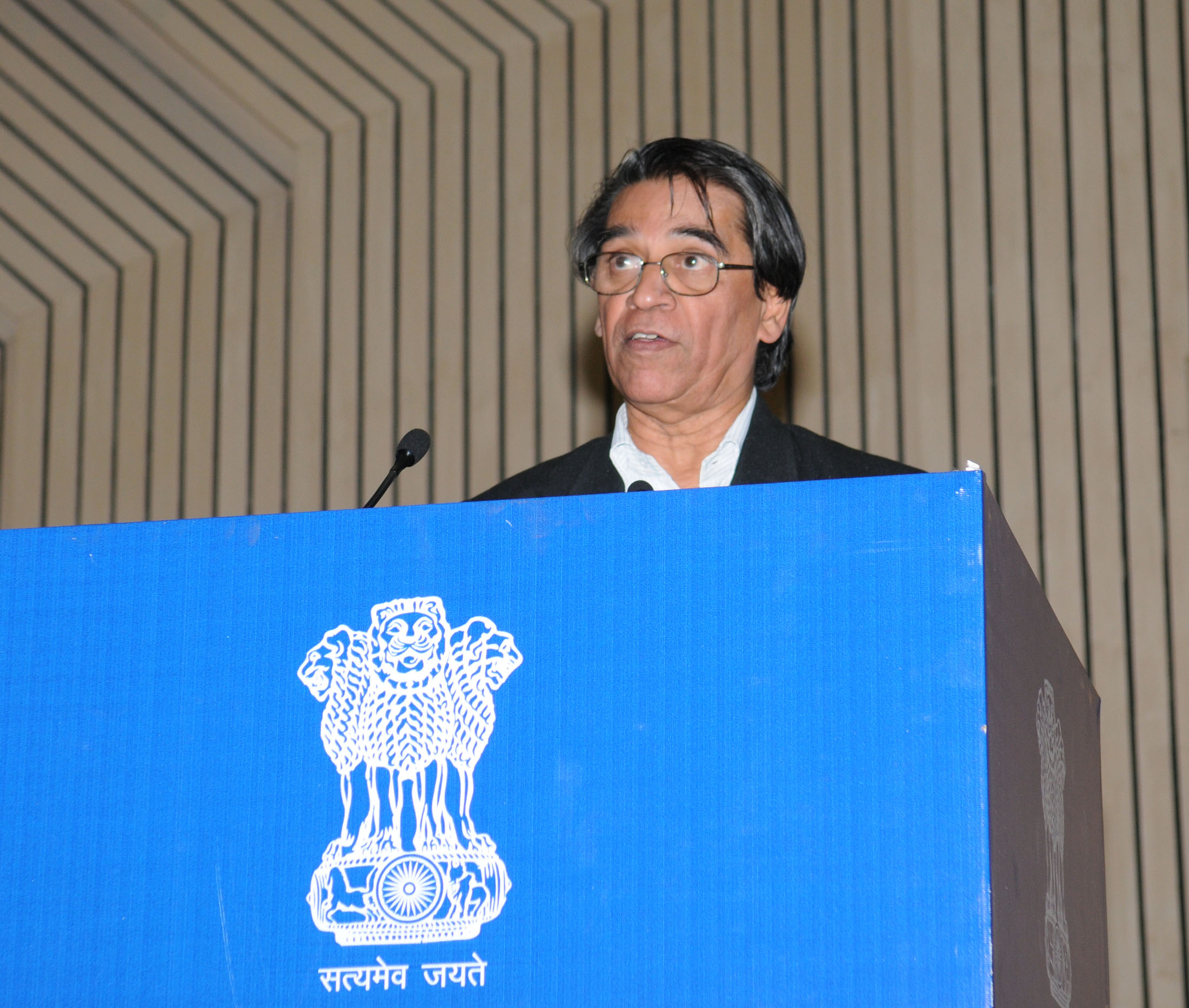
The Secretary, Department of Science & Technology, Dr. T. Ramasami addressing a Symposium on “Changing India” on the occasion of Technology Day Function 2011, in New Delhi on 11 May 2011

Ramasami assumed the role of Secretary, Science & Technology in the Government of India since May 2006. The department has sought a fifth extension for him which something that is considered rare at his level in the central government. The department of science and technology bid farewell to its secretary, Dr T Ramasami on 5 May 2014 after he superannuated at the age of 66 years. During his eight years stint at the DST, Dr Ramasami was instrumental in its budget increase that jumped several-fold and launch of many new programs. He was also holding the additional charges as the director general, Council for Scientific and Industrial Research (CSIR).

== Honours and awards ==
Some of the Honors, awards and recognitions that have come his way include:

=== Major awards ===
- Padma Bhushan Award in 2014
- National Civilian Honour Padma Shri (Science and Engineering), Govt. of India, 2001
- Shanti Swarup Bhatnagar Award for Chemical Sciences, 1993. (Highest award for science in India, awarded annually by the Council of Scientific and Industrial Research for notable and outstanding research)
- Coleman Research Prize, 1976 (for the Best Doctoral Thesis from the UK).
- Material Research Society of India (MRSI) Medal, 2001
- Vasvik Prize for Environmental Technologies, 2004(for Development of Pollution Control system in leather industry.
- Vasvik Prize for Chemical Sciences, 1997(for Development of chromium aluminium synthetic tanning agent, Alcrotan.
- Great son of the soil award from All India conference of intellectuals, 2003.
- Dr. Y. Nayudamma Memorial Award, 2008

=== Other awards ===
- Platinum Jubilee Award of the Indian Chemical Society, 2001.
- Chemito Award for excellence in Chemistry and Life sciences.
- Silver Medal of the Chemical Research Society of India, 2003.
- Om Prakash Bhasin Award for Engineering and Technology, 2000.
- For the sake of honour award (Rotary Club).
- Vocational Services Award from Rotary Club.
- Honorary Professorship of JN Centre for Advanced Research.
- Distinguished Alumnus Award, Anna University, Chennai.

=== Fellowships ===
- Fellow, Indian National Science Academy.
- Fellow, Indian Institute of Chemical Engineers.
- Fellow, Third World Academy of Sciences.
- Fellow, Indian Academy of Sciences
- Fellow, Indian National Academy of Engineers
- Fellow. National Academy of Science of India
- Fellow, Indian Leather technologists Association

=== Endowment Lecture awards ===
- 42nd John Arthur Wilson Memorial Lecture Orator Award, 2001 by American Leather Chemists Association.
- Indian Institute of Chemical Technology (IICT)-Darshan Endowment Lecture award, 2004.
- Acharya P C Ray Memorial Oration Award.
- ALFA Orator Award, 2003.* Elizabath Mathai Endowment Oration.
- Prof. G S Laddha Endowment Lecture award.

== Personal life ==
A lifelong bachelor committed to science, he came in news in December 2025 when he became a victim of a digital arrest scam where he lost Rs. 57 lakh.
