= Thiru. Vi. Ka. Bridge =

Bridge in Chennai, India

- Coordinates: 13°0′45.8″N 80°15′33.3″E
- Carries: 6 lanes of traffic
- Crosses: Adyar River
- Locale: Chennai, Tamil Nadu, India

Characteristics
- Material: Concrete

Location
- Interactive map of Thiru. Vi. Ka. Bridge

Thiru Vi. Ka. Bridge is a road bridge across the Adyar River in Chennai, India. It is connects Mylapore to the north of the river with Adyar to the south. Named after Indian independence activist Thiru. V. Kalyanasundaram, the bridge was constructed in 1973 to replace the Elphinstone Bridge, constructed in 1840.
