= Pranav Sharma =

Indian astronomer and science historian

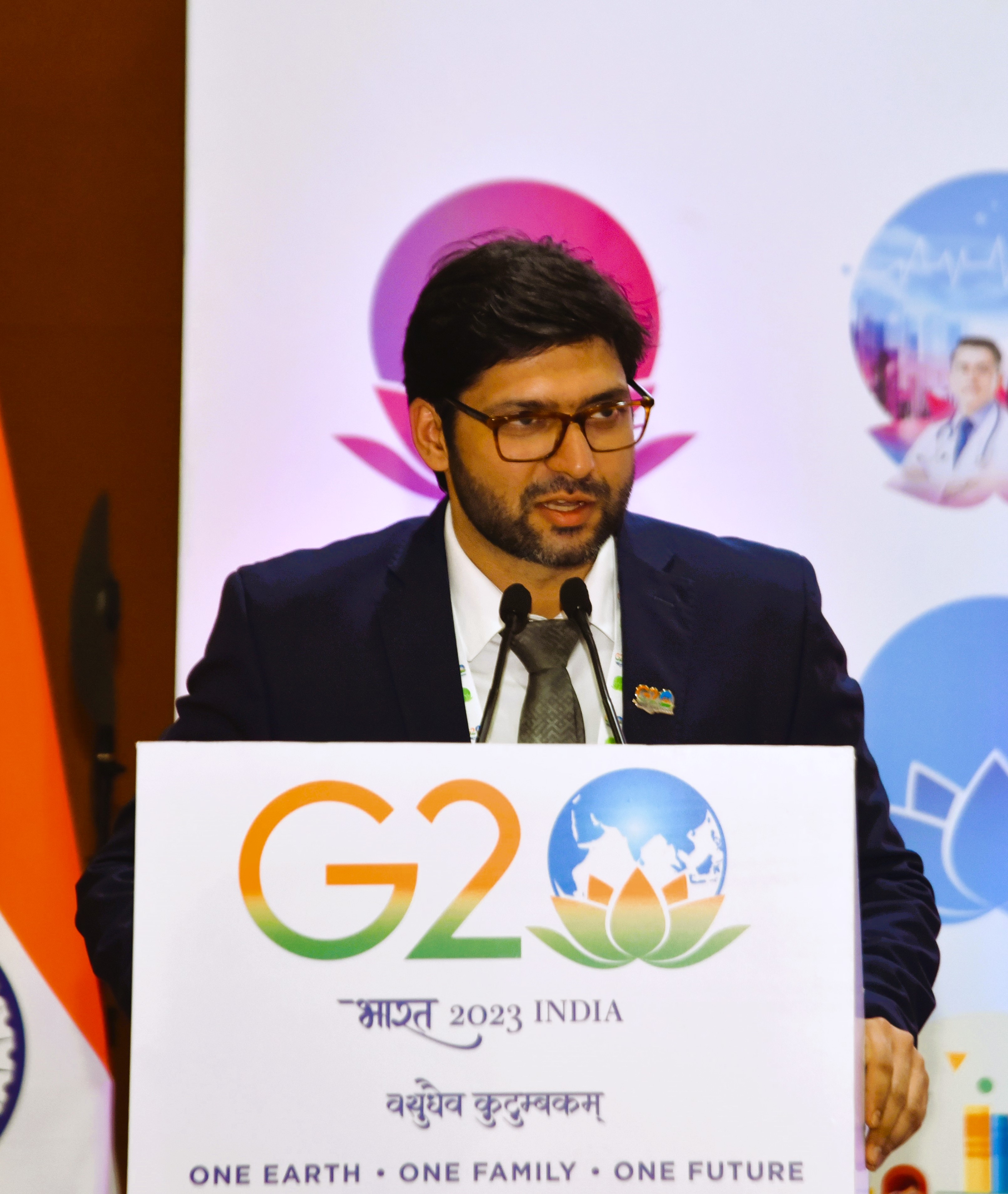
- Pranav Sharma at G20-Science20 Conference in Agartala, 2023

Pranav Sharma (Hindi: प्रणव शर्मा) is an astronomer and science historian known for his work on the history of the Indian Space Program. He has curated the Space Museum at the B. M. Birla Science Centre (Hyderabad, India). Sharma was in charge of the history of the Indo-French scientific partnership project supported by the Embassy of France in India. He is a national award-winning science communicator and has extensively worked on the popularization of astronomy education in India.

He also served as the Policy and Diplomacy Advisor to United Nations International Computation Centre and Member Secretary (Policy, Transdisciplinary Disruptive Science, and Communications) for G20-Science20.

Sharma is the Co-Lead on the History of Data-Driven Astronomy Project, Adjunct Researcher at Raman Research Institute, Scientific Advisor to Arc Ventures, Science Diplomacy Consultant to Indian National Science Academy, and Visiting Faculty at The Druk Gyalpo's Institute, Bhutan. He is an Associate Member of Astronomical Society of India.

He has co-authored the book Essential Astrophysics: Interstellar Medium to Stellar Remnants, CRC Press, 2019.
