= Elphinstone Bridge, Chennai =

Bridge in Chennai, India

Coordinates: 13.014703°N 80.259226°E

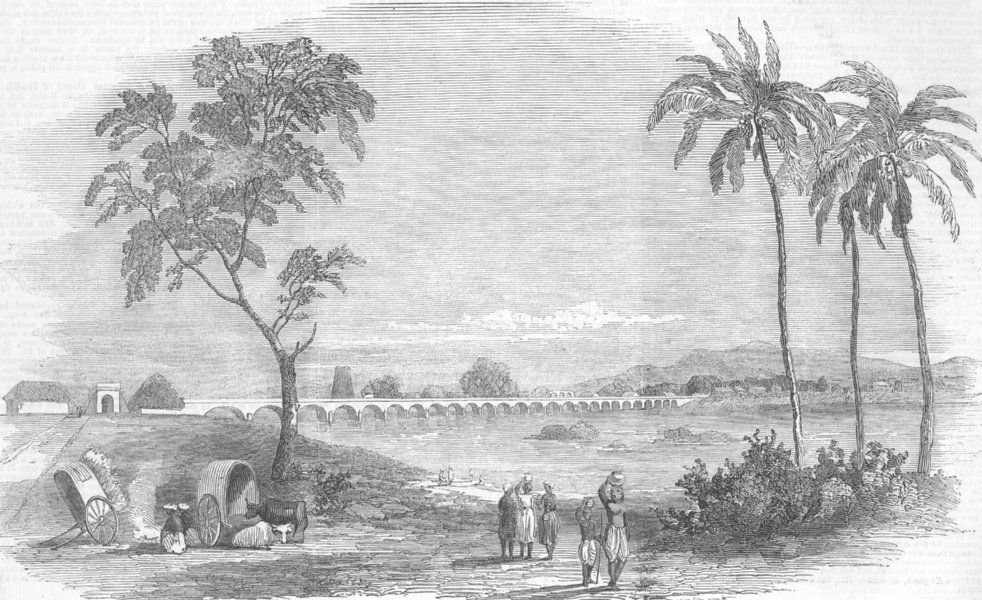
Bridge recently erected over the River Corvery near Bhowanee, Madras, from The Illustrated London News, 1851

Elphinstone Bridge is a bridge across the Adyar River in Chennai, India. Constructed in 1840 and named after the then Governor-General of India, the bridge is currently not in use and has been substituted with the newly built Thiru Vi. Ka. Bridge nearby.
