= Anna Centenary Library =

Public Library in India

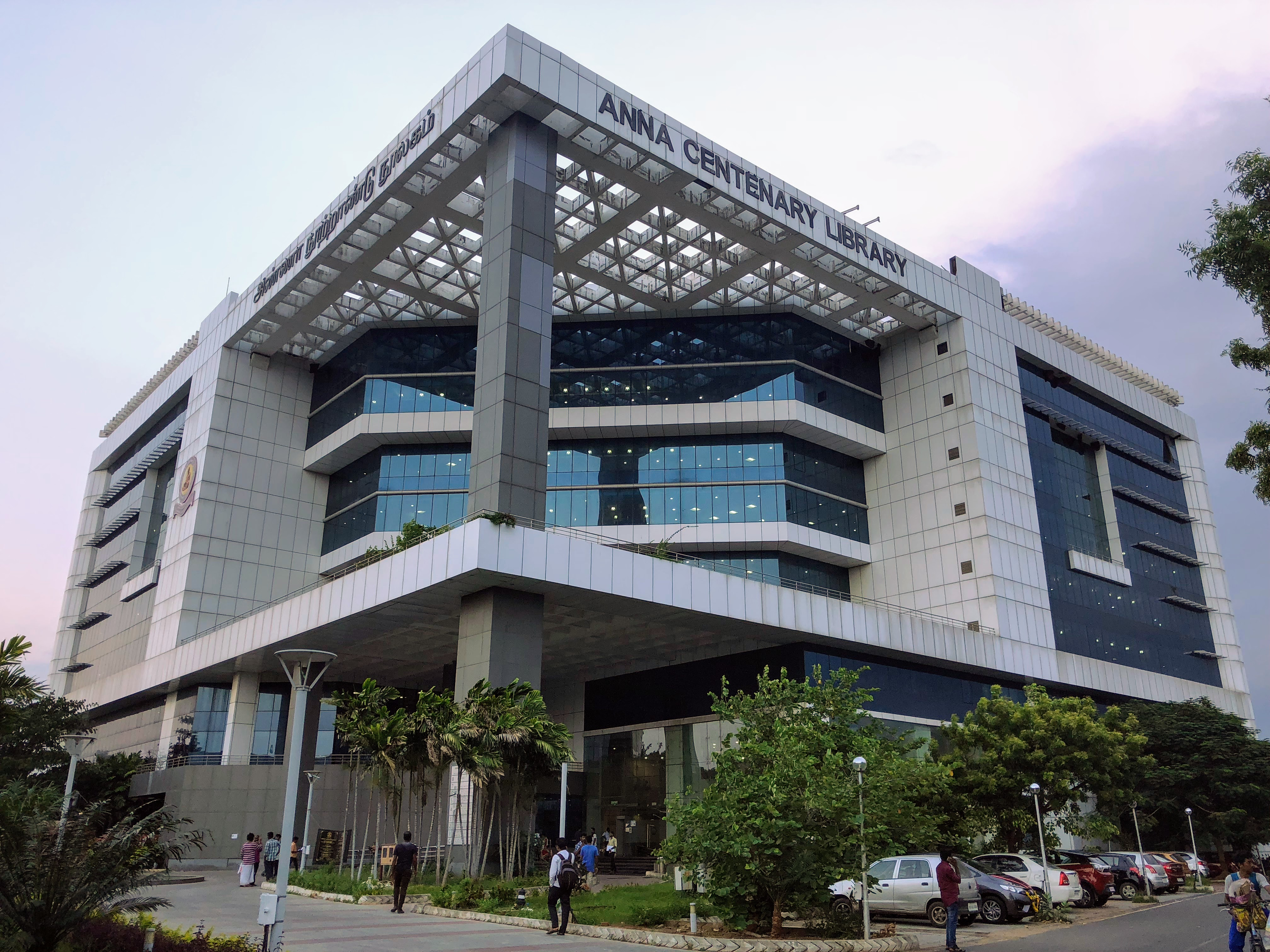
- Anna Centenary Library Entrance
- 13.0175°N 80.2391°E
- Location: Kotturpuram, Chennai, Tamil Nadu, India
- Type: Public Library
- Established: 15 September 2010

Collection
- Items collected: Books, Journals, Magazines, Braille Books, Manuscripts
- Size: 1.2 million
- Criteria for collection: Books from leading publishers throughout the world

Other information
- Employees: 150
- Website: www.annacentenarylibrary.org

The Anna Centenary Library (ACL) is an established state library of the Government of Tamil Nadu. It is located at Kotturpuram, Chennai. It is built at a cost of ₹172 crores (₹1,720 million). It is named after a former chief minister of Tamil Nadu, C. N. Annadurai. It was opened by the then Chief Minister of Tamil Nadu M. Karunanidhi. The average number of persons who visited the library between January and October 2011 is around 26,500, compared to the monthly average of 20,000 in 2010.

== Infrastructure ==
Built on 8 acres of land, the 9-floor library houses a total area of 333,140 sq. ft and has a capacity to accommodate 1.2 million books. ACL has planned to adopt an integrated library management system that includes automated issue and return of books, user smartcards, access controls, Radio Frequency Identification (RFID) technology and self-check counters. The library is designed to accommodate a total of 1,250 persons. An auditorium of 50,000 sq. ft. with a seating capacity of 1,280, and an amphitheatre on the terrace that can accommodate more than 800 persons and two conference halls with capacities of 151 and 30 persons respectively, are some of the facilities available. A dedicated children's section, spread over 15,000 sq. ft. has a theme-based reading area with multimedia kits and storybooks. The library also has a section for the visually impaired, with talking books and Braille displays. Parking space exists for about 420 cars and 1,030 two-wheelers. A separate power substation with a capacity of 32 kV has been built on the premises. CCTV cameras have been installed in 493 locations in the building. A food court in the building is capable of serving 180 persons at any given point in time. The library was designed by C. N. Raghavendran.

The entrance to the building showcases a 5 ft bronze statue of C.N. Annadurai. The library employs 200 staff, including 96 permanent and 40 contract employees, and has a collection of 550,000 books. It is visited by about 2701 persons every day.

The library has a special section for Braille, children's books and manuscripts etc. The building is designed in such a way that the reading area receives good daylight. The western end is flanked by the service areas to prevent solar radiation. The seven-storey atrium allows in abundant natural light.

In July 2010, the library building received the LEED NC Gold rating from IGBC becoming the first library building in Asia to reach this. This project has achieved 43 LEED points, highest amongst any government buildings in Tamil Nadu thus far.

== Controversy ==
A few months after Ms. J.Jayalalitha from the AIADMK took over as the Chief Minister of Tamil Nadu in the 2011 Elections, she announced her decision to convert the Library building in Kotturpuram, Chennai to accommodate a Super speciality Pediatric hospital. She declared that the library would be shifted to the proposed Integrated Knowledge Park on the DPI (Directorate of Public Instruction) campus in Nungambakkam, Chennai. The decision sparked great outrage from educationists, writers and students. Facebook pages and blogs were opened and worked on 'saving the library'. While no association or individual was opposed to the idea of a fully equipped super speciality hospital coming up for children, writers and others who frequent the library urged the government to revoke its decision of shifting a fully functional library that has gone on to become a storehouse of knowledge and a key landmark in the city. A senior professor at the University of Madras said: "The library is excellent, offering very good facilities. In fact, there was a proposal to shift the oriental manuscripts in our University to the new library, so that they can be preserved better. Even that was prevented after the AIADMK came to power. The old manuscripts are lying in very poor condition." The then former chief minister Mr. Karunanidhi who built the Library even threatened that he would immolate himself to prevent the alteration. The Madras high court then stayed the Tamil Nadu government's controversial proposal to shift the Anna Centenary Library to DPI campus in Nungambakkam.

== Operations ==
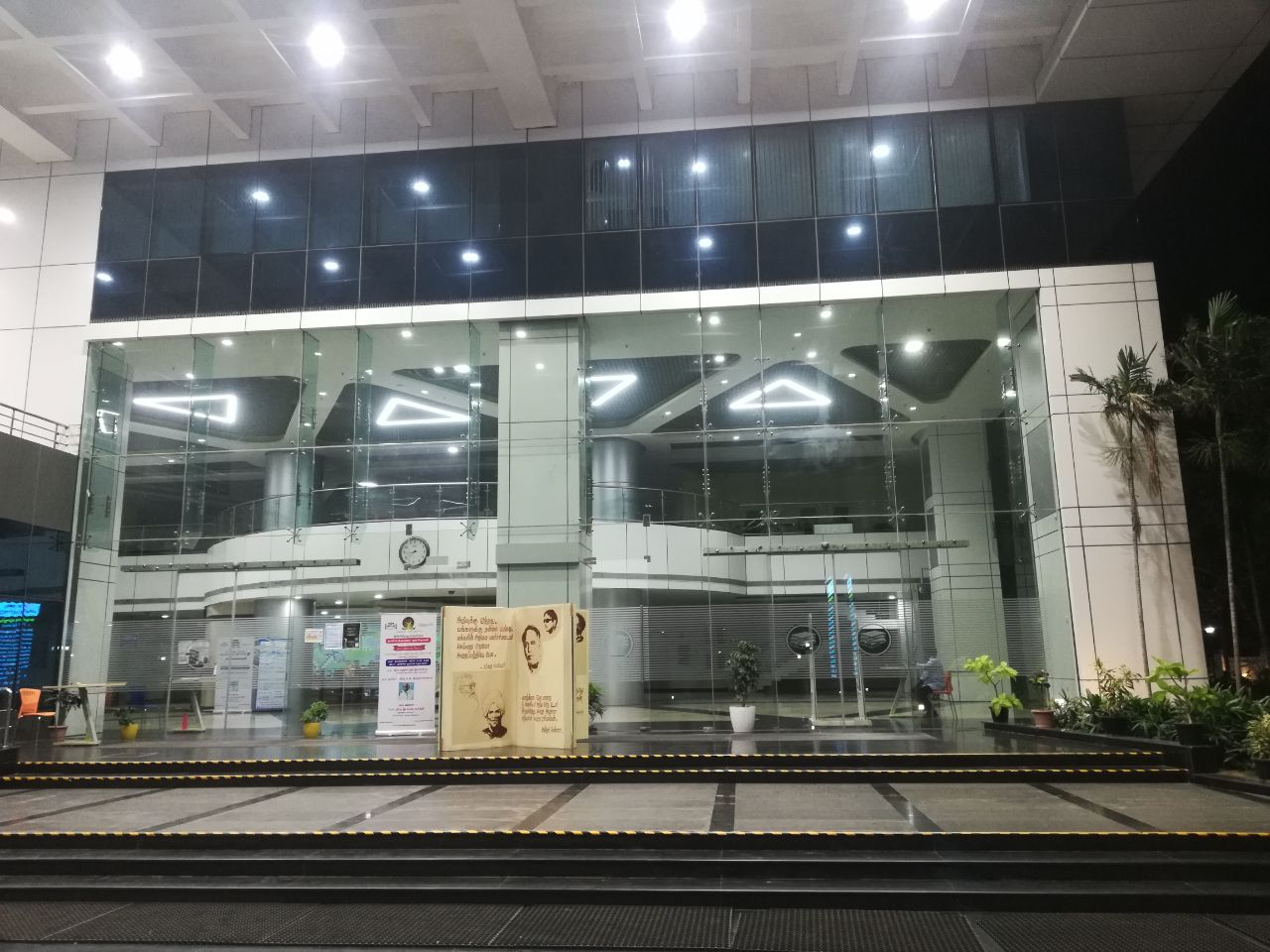
Lobby at the main entrance of the library

After the inauguration of the library, consulates in the city expressed interest in visiting the library and donating books to it.

In October 2010, soon after the inauguration, the library placed an order involving 35,174 books worth £1.275 million with the Cambridge University Press (CUP), resulting in the biggest sale in CUP's history to an academic library in India and the biggest invoice CUP has ever issued – at 2,794 pages long.

A single order worth a million euros was placed with the world's largest publisher of books, Springer, which publishes in the fields of science, technology and medicine. Hillary Clinton, U.S. Secretary of State had lauded the library during her visit to Chennai on 20 July 2011.

== Sections ==
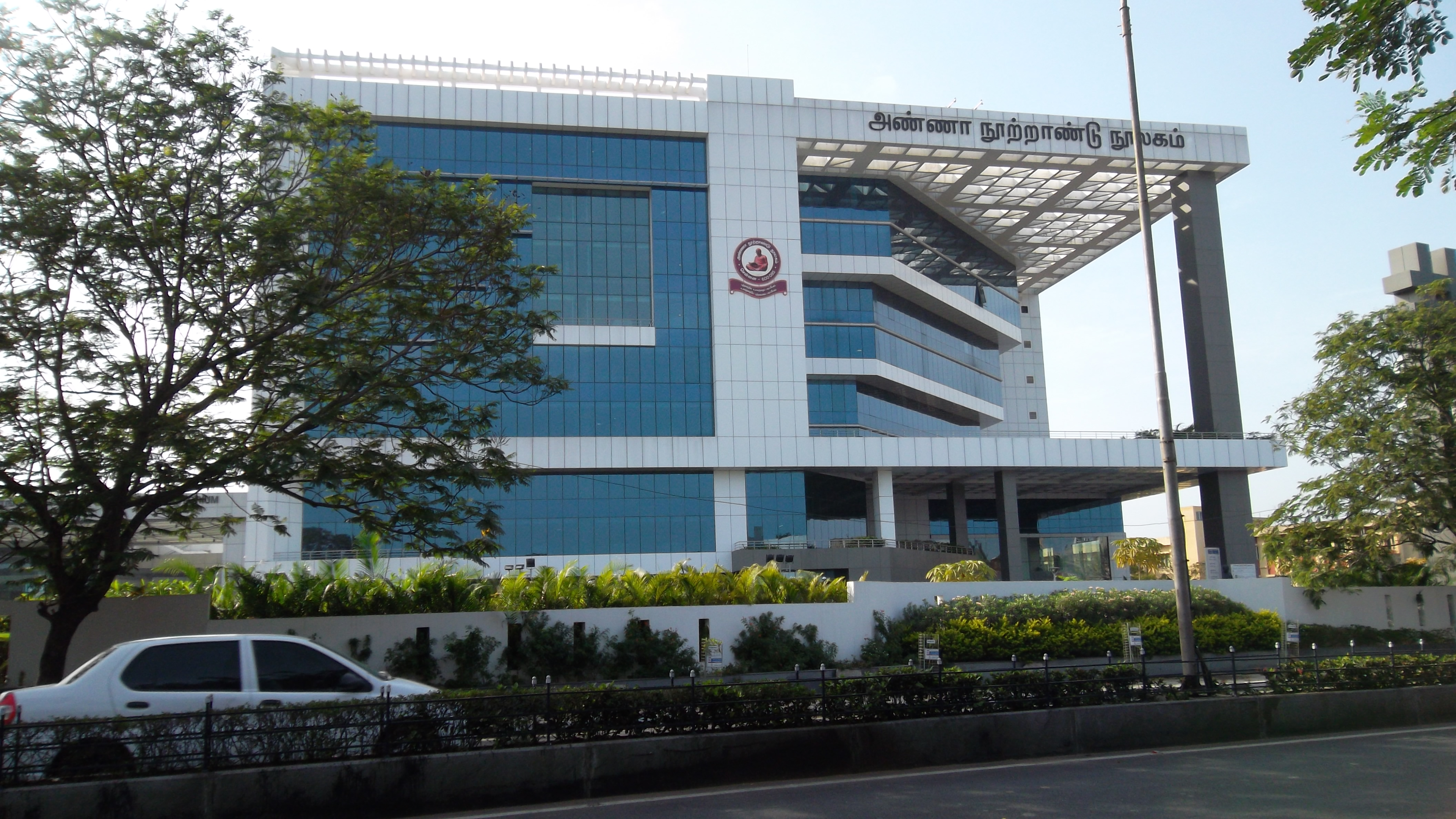
Library's Exterior

- Braille Section: Braille Section is located at Ground Floor, special care is taken to facilitate Braille readers in this section. This section has 1500 printed Braille books, 145 e-books and 1080 Audio Books
- Own Book Reading Section: This section is located at the ground floor. It is a boon to the users who are searching for spacious, cool and calm reading environment in the city. The readers’ have the liberty to carry their personal notebooks, textbooks, learning materials and, laptops. It has comfortable furniture for readers. This section opens at 8.00am. Students are allowed inside according to their token number. Tokens have to be gotten from security personnel much earlier than 8.00am because after token no 90 is allowed inside, the remaining token no's students have to wait till 9.00am for opening of another own book reading section on first floor, which is not as comfortable as the section on the ground floor.
- Children's Section: Children Section is located in the first floor ' B wing ' it spreads over 15,000 sq. ft. It has over 60,000 books which cover all subject areas. This section has a very good collection of books ranges from Alphabets, Numerals to Children Encyclopedias. Majority of books are in English and it has books in different Indian and foreign languages (Tamil, Telugu, Malayalam, Kannada and Hindi, German, French, Spanish and Italian). Over 2000 Multimedia CDs, DVDs in different categories and subjects are available for the users. Any children who are at the age between 4 years and 14 years can access this section.
- Periodicals Section: Periodicals section is located in the ‘A’ Wing of first floor. Newspapers and Magazines and Journals are kept in this section. All leading newspapers and magazines are available in this section for readers. Currently 37 leading dailies in different languages are being subscribed. The library is subscribing over 500 Indian and Foreign Magazines in all categories to serve user needs. There is an exclusive section for women readers which comprises magazines focused on women.
- Tamil Books Section: Second Floor of this library is dedicated to "Classical Language (Semmozhi)" Tamil. In this section we have almost all the books published in Tamil available in print. Readers who are fond of reading Tamil books can see the huge collections Tamil books from all leading publishers. Over 100,000 books in the form of Novels, Poems, Short Stories, Drama, Essays, Humor, letters.
- English Book Section: This library has over 450,000 books in all subjects areas published by leading publishers across the world. English Books occupy majority of the library space from third floor to seventh floor.
  - Third Floor: General, Computer Science, Library & Information Science, Philosophy, Psychology, Ethics, Religion, Sociology, Statistics, Political science.
  - Fourth Floor: Economics, Law, Public Administration, Education, Languages & Linguistics, Literature, Folklore.
  - Fifth Floor: General Science, Mathematics, Astronomy, Physics, Chemistry, Earth science & Geology, Fossils & prehistoric life, Life science (Biology), Plants (Botany), Animals (Zoology), Applied Science - Basic, Medicine & Health
  - Sixth Floor: Engineering, Agriculture, Home & Family management, Veterinary Science, Management & Public Relation, Accounting, Fine Arts, Architecture, Photography & Computer Arts, Music, Sports, Games & Entertainment.
  - Seventh Floor: History, Geography, Travel, Biography, e-library, Government Oriental Manuscript Library.
- Administrative Office: Eighth Floor.

== Events ==
- A literary event named "Ponmalai Pozhudhu" is organized every Saturday. Leading personalities from various subjects deliver special talks on this event.
- A special orientation program for competitive exam aspirants is arranged at Anna Centenary Library on Sundays. Bureaucrats and subject experts share their experience, interact and motivate the aspirants.
- Children's section of the library organizes programmes like Art and Craft, Chess, Memory technique, Music, Painting, Science Experiments, Story Telling etc. for children on every Sundays morning.

== See also ==
- Connemara Public Library
