= M.P. Birla Planetarium, Kolkata =

M. P. Birla Planetarium
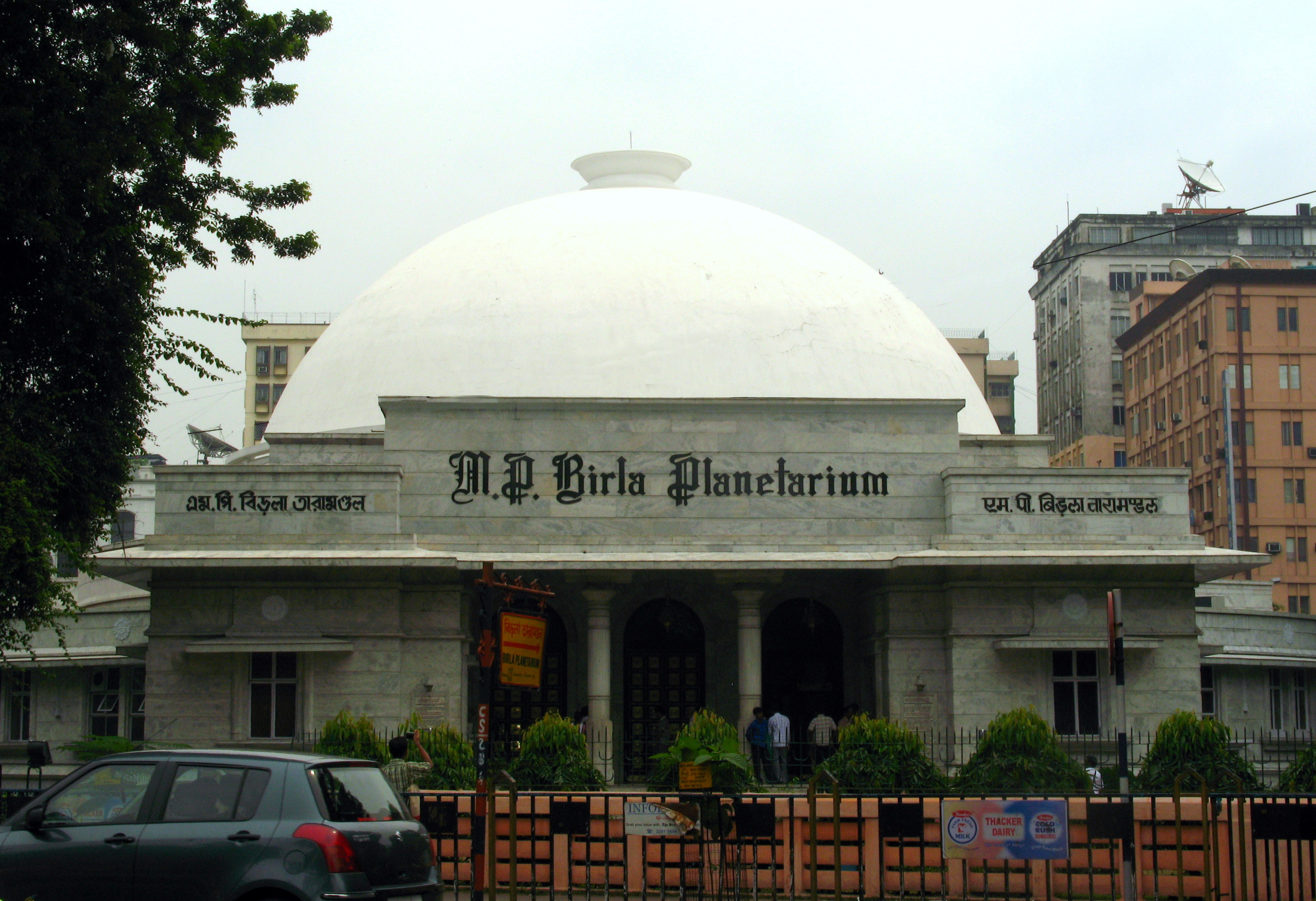
- M. P. Birla Planetarium, Kolkata
- Established: 1963; 63 years ago
- Location: No. 96, Jawaharlal Nehru Road, Kolkata, India
- Coordinates: 22°32′43.92″N 88°20′42.70″E
- Type: Planetarium museum
- Website: mpbirlaplanetarium.org

The Birla Planetarium (officially M. P. Birla Planetarium) in Kolkata, West Bengal, India, is a single-storeyed circular structure designed in the typical Indian style, whose architecture is loosely styled on the Buddhist Stupa at Sanchi. Situated at Chowringhee Road adjacent to the Victoria Memorial, St. Paul's Cathedral and the Maidan in Central Kolkata, it is the largest planetarium in Asia and the second largest planetarium in the world. There are two other Birla Planetariums in India: B.M. Birla Planetarium in Chennai and the Birla Planetarium in Hyderabad.

Popularly known as taramandal, the planetarium was inaugurated on 2 July 1963 by the then Prime Minister of India, Jawaharlal Nehru. It has an electronics laboratory for design and fabrication of science equipment. It has an astronomy gallery that maintains a huge collection of fine paintings and celestial models of renowned astronomers. The Planetarium also has an astronomical observatory equipped with a Celestron C-14 Telescope with accessories such as ST6 CCD camera and solar filter. It offers to the public and students more than 100 astronomical projects dealing with various facts of astronomy, astro-physics, Space Science as well as myths concerning stars and planets. It has a capacity of 570.

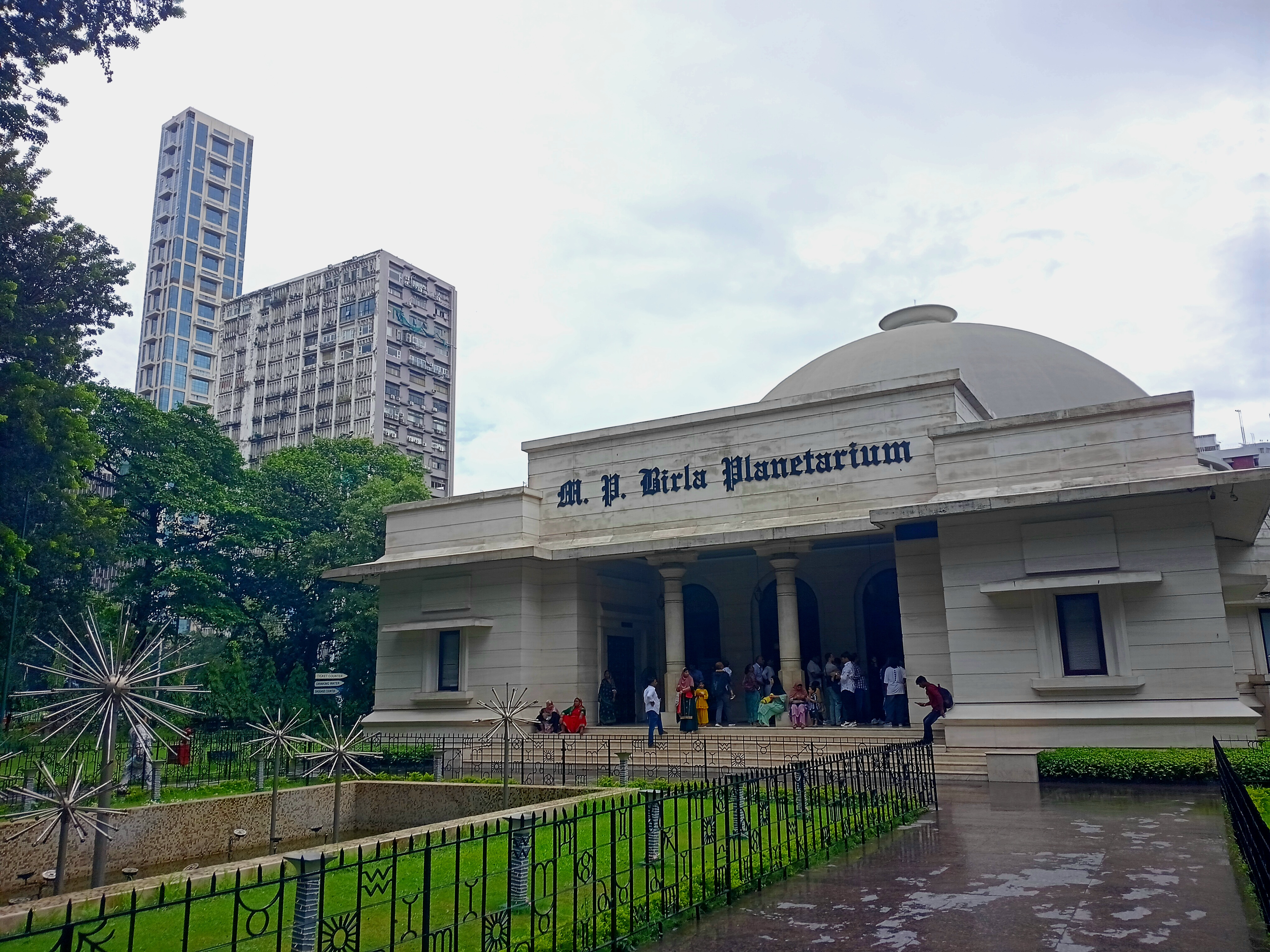
M.P. Birla Planetarium, Kolkata

Daily programs are conducted in English, Bengali and Hindi. The show timings are as follows: 12:00 PM Hindi, 1:00 PM English, 2:00 PM Hindi, 3:00 PM Bengali, 4:00 PM Hindi, 5:00 PM Bengali, 6:00 PM English. Programs are occasionally conducted in Odiya, Tamil and Gujarati, as well. Extra shows are arranged on holidays. The Planetarium was constructed by ML Dalmiya & Co. which is owned by Board of Control for Cricket in India former president late Jagmohan Dalmiya.

It reopened to public on 18 July 2017, after closing down for 28 months of renovations work. The new planetarium system for the Birla Planetarium is a so-called ZEISS Hybrid Planetarium, with the STARMASTER, an optical-mechanical planetarium projector (also called "Starball") working in sync with a dome video display system. The Starball presents the most realistic starfield in the dome with superimposed images of constellation outlines, space objects like nebula and galaxies, planets and moons by the VELVET digital video system, called fulldome projection. The technical upgrade was delivered and installed by the German company Carl Zeiss AG.

== See also ==
- Astrotourism in India
- M. P. Birla Institute of Fundamental Research
- List of astronomical societies
- List of planetariums
