= M. P. Birla Institute of Fundamental Research =

Indian astronomical and applied science research institute

Coordinates: 12.9842°N 77.5867°E

- Type: Research institute
- Legal status: Registered under the West Bengal Societies Act of 1961
- Purpose: Research for astronomy astrobiology and astrophysics
- Headquarters: Kolkata, West Bengal, India
- Director: Dr. G. S. D. Babu

M. P. Birla Institute of Fundamental Research (Bangalore branch)
- Legal status: Registered under the West Bengal Societies Act of 1961
- Location: Bangalore, India
- Director: Dr. G. S. D. Babu (Bangalore)
- Scientific Officer: Dr. Sujatha S. (Bangalore)
- Research Scholar: Ms. Urmi Doshi (Bangalore)
- Research Scholar: Mr. Krishna Kumar Kaushik (Bangalore)
- Website: www.mpbifr-blr.in (Bangalore location)

The M. P. Birla Institute of Fundamental Research, is a natural and applied sciences research institute and society headquartered in Kolkata, West Bengal, India. Its director is astrophysicist Dr. G. S. D. Babu.

The institute is involved in research in conjunction with the Birla Planetarium, also located in Kolkata, which is one of the world's largest planetariums.

The institute has conducted courses in astrobiology for undergraduate students, in which certificates of completion are awarded after course completion.

== Bangalore branch ==
The institute has a branch in Bangalore, India devoted to astronomy and astrophysics. The Bangalore location is recognized by Bangalore University as a research center to conduct research programs for Ph.D. degrees in physics specializing in astrophysics under Bangalore University's jurisdiction.
