= Kotturpuram =

Kottakuppam
- Neighbourhood
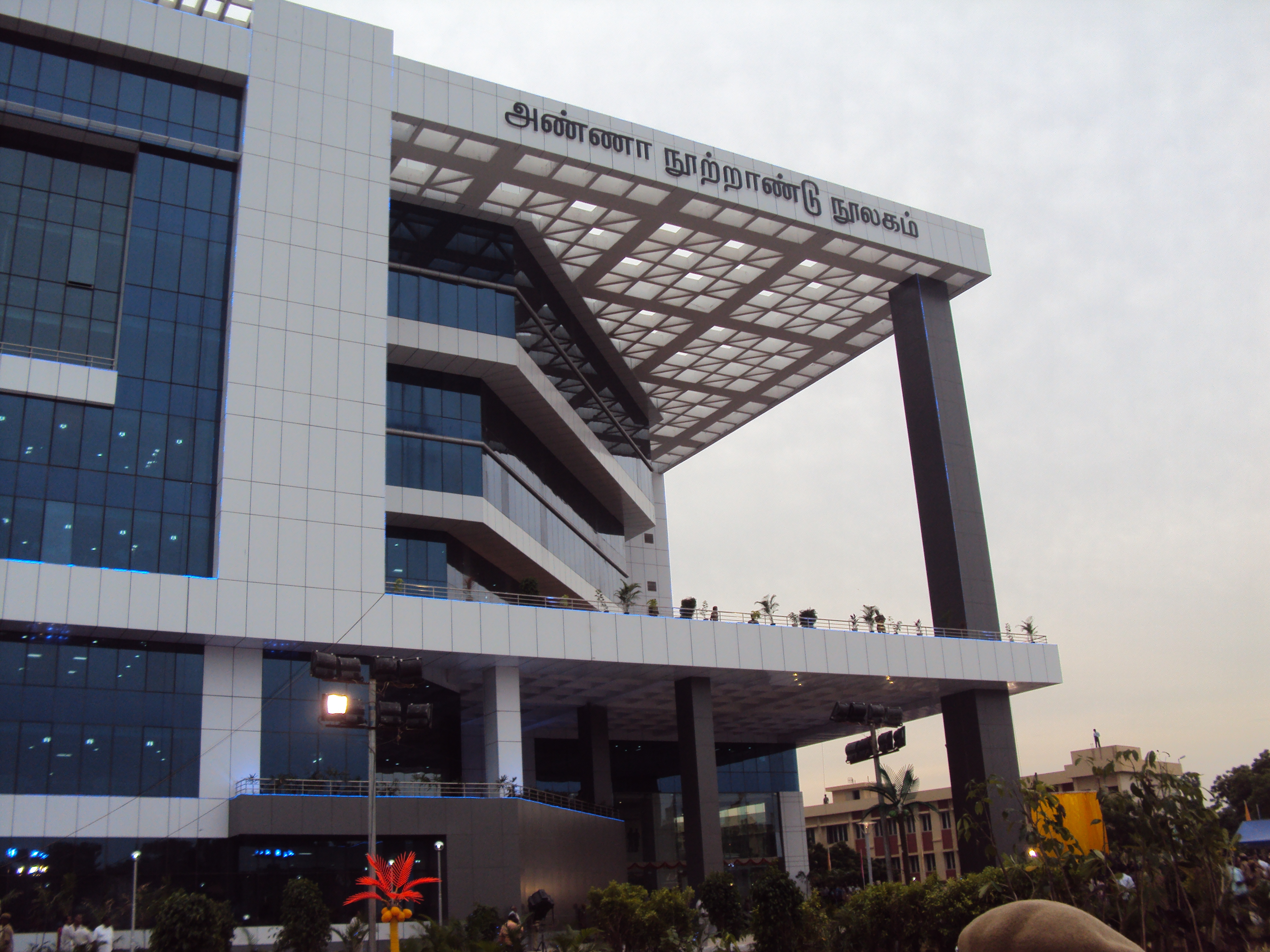
- A view of the Anna Centenary Library in Kotturpuram

- Location within Chennai Location within Tamil Nadu Location within India
- Coordinates: 13.0196°N 80.2458°E
- Country: India
- State: Tamil Nadu
- District: Chennai
- Metro: Chennai
- Zone: Saidapet
- Ward: 138

Languages
  - Official: Tamil
- Time zone: UTC+5:30 (IST)
- PIN: 600085
- Vehicle registration: TN-07
- Lok Sabha constituency: Chennai South
- Vidhan Sabha constituency: Saidapet

Kotturpuram, also known as Kottur, is a neighbourhood in Chennai (Madras), Tamil Nadu, India and is situated in the Southern banks of the Adyar River. It is surrounded by Nandanam in the North and North-West, Adyar in the South-East, IIT Chennai and Guindy in the South and Little Mount (a part of Greater Saidapet) in the South-West. The neighbourhood is served by Kotturpuram MRTS railway station. Centuries old Hindu temples, such as Perumal Koil (around 1000 years) and Ponniamman Koil (around 400 years) are situated in Kottur.

== Anna Centenary Library ==
Anna Centenary Library, one of South East Asia's largest libraries is located here. It was inaugurated by former Chief minister of Tamil Nadu M. Karunanidhi.

== Administration details ==
This area has part of revenue village Kottur, which comes under Mylapore-Triplicane Taluk and part of revenue village (Zamin) Adyar, which comes under Mambalam-Guindy Taluk.

This whole area comes under Adyar Sub-Register office for any registrations and under Saidapet corporation for getting voter ID etc.

== History ==
Kotturpuram consist of three areas:

=== Kottur ===
(Zamin) Adyar and Kottur Village settlements form this part.

=== Kottur Gardens ===
The area was originally Nawab's Garden (Nawabs of Arcot), which was later purchased by M. A. Chidambaram from whom the Government of Tamil Nadu purchased it for development.

This area was developed by Tamil Nadu Housing Board under a Housing Board scheme in 1975. The scheme included Individual houses and Flats under HIG and MIG category in a planned layout with 5 main roads, crescent road, circular road and loop streets. The scheme also demarcated shopping complexes and parks. The area was initially called TNHB colony and was handed over to the residents after completion of the scheme. It was subsequently renamed to "Kottur Gardens". The residents of Kottur Gardens are part of a voluntary residents welfare association called "Kottur Gardens Residents Association".

=== Kotturpuram ===
The TNSC constructed flats in the river bed since it was on the dead-end (No Bridge on the River in 1960-70) outside the main area i.e. Kottur hence Puram (meaning Exterior in Tamil) was added. This area lies west of Gandhi Mandapam Salai.

The MRTS Station at Kottur was named Kotturpuram MRTS Station to avoid confusion with Korattur Station and Kotturu Station.
