= Central Leather Research Institute =

Leather research institute

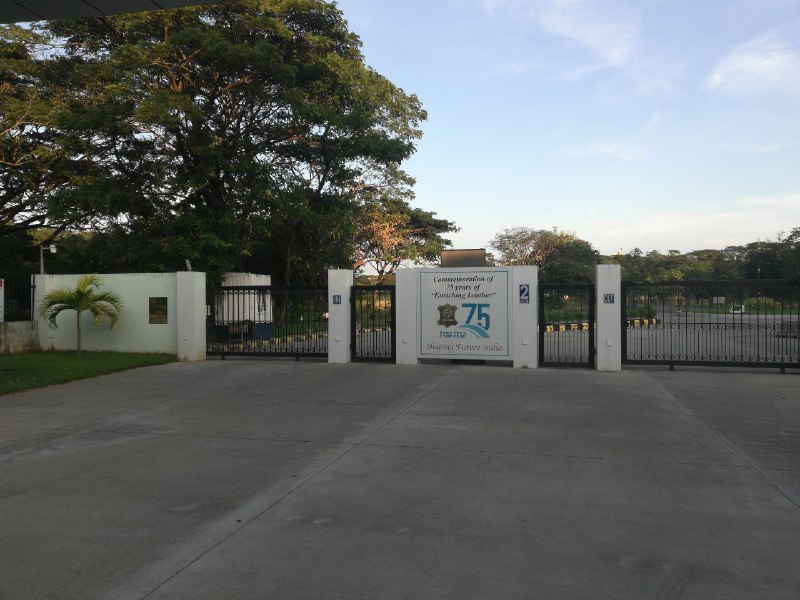
Entrance of the CLRI in Chennai

Central Leather Research Institute or CLRI is the world's largest leather research institute in terms of research papers and patents. The institute located in Chennai, Tamil Nadu was founded on 24 April 1948 as a constituent laboratory under the Council of Scientific and Industrial Research.

== History ==
Soon after India attained independence in 1947, the first government of the country led by Jawaharlal Nehru focused on industrialisation. As a part of that, several research laboratories and institutes, such as National Physical Laboratory in New Delhi, National Chemical Laboratory in Pune, National Metallurgical Laboratory in Jamshedpur, Fuel Research Institute in Dhanbad, Central Glass and Ceramic Research Institute in Kolkata, were set up across the country. On 24 April 1948, the then Central Minister of Industry and Supply Syama Prasad Mookerjee laid the foundation stone in the Guindy region of Chennai. Madras State awarded 75 acres (30 ha; 0.117 sq mi) to the Council of Scientific and Industrial Research and ₹4,000 (equivalent to ₹450,000 or US$4,700 in 2023) towards expenses for levelling the land and making it suitable for building construction.

== Activities ==
The objective of the institute was to deal with all aspects of the leather industry. It carries out research and development in areas such as adapted preservation methods for new hides and skins, improvement of existing leather with respect to shrinkage and color fastness, tanning and finishing techniques, control of environmental pollution, and product design and development of garments, shoes and other articles. The institute also offers technical assistance through training courses on design development, sample making and fabrication, consultancy, preparation of feasibility reports, quality control, among various other activities.

The institute houses departments such as Chemical and Physical Sciences, Biological Sciences, Engineering Sciences and Information Sciences. Besides this, the institute has four regional extension centers in Ahmedabad, Jalandhar, Kanpur and Kolkata.

== Milestones ==
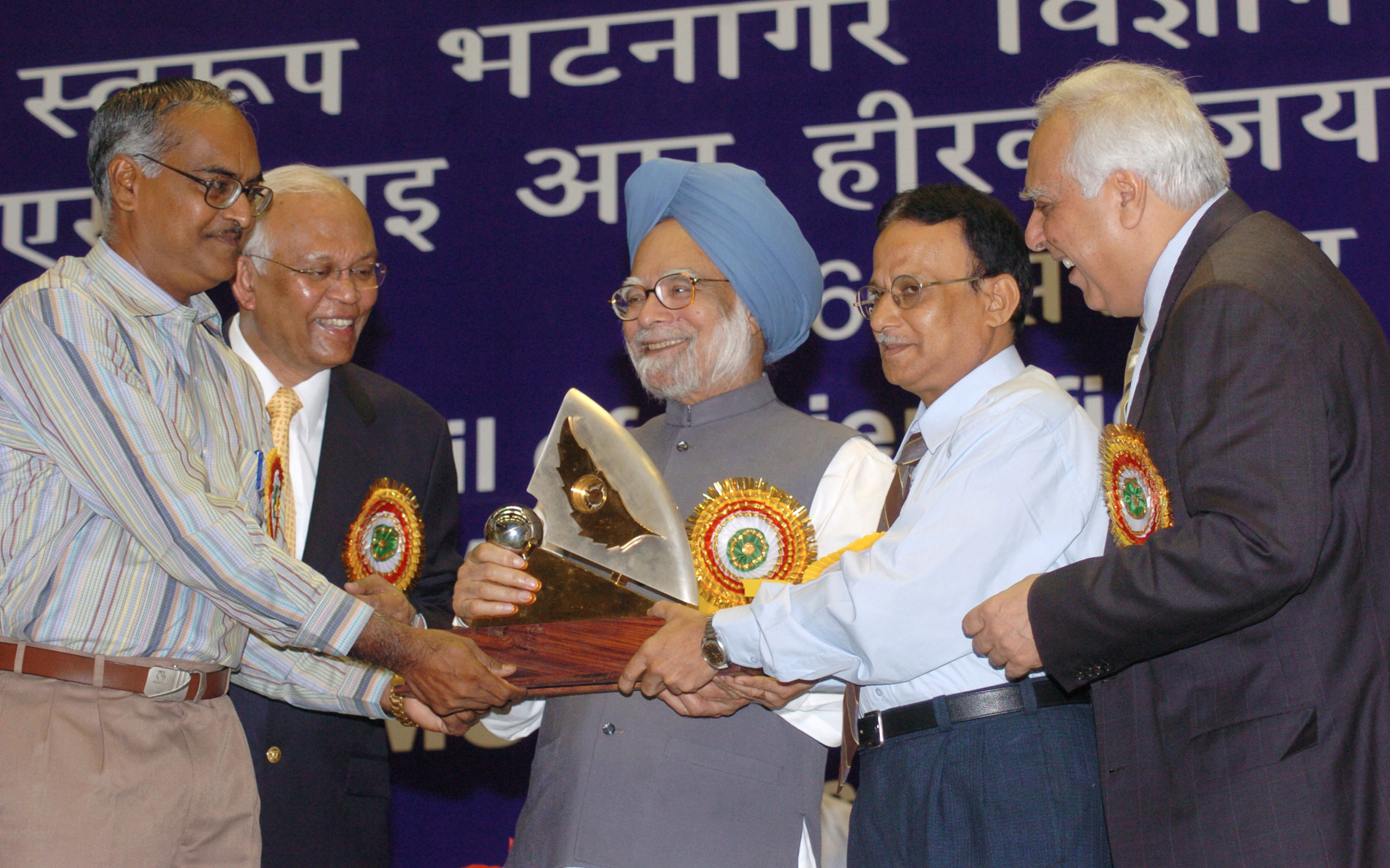
The Prime Minister, Manmohan Singh giving away the CSIR Award for S&T Innovations for Rural Development–2006 to the Central Leather Research Institute (Chennai), in 2006

In 2003, the institute came up with a biological dressing for burn patients that helps in healing second and third degree burns faster and more effectively. In 2004, the institute tied up with National Institute of Fashion Technology to offer professional educational programmes specifically for designing footwear and leather products. In the same year, the institute took up a pilot activity to produce biodiesel from rice bran oil. In 2014, CLRI Scientists launched website to conveniently share real research problems and solutions in research. In 2023, the institute came out with an Indian Footwear Sizing System (BHA), after analysing over 1 lakh feet spanning 70 plus districts in the country.

== Notable people from the institute ==
- G. N. Ramachandran developed a triple-helical model of collagen using samples provided by the institute during his research in 1954. He was later awarded the 1999 Ewald Prize for his contributions.
- Thirumalachari Ramasami, a former director of the institute, was a renowned chemist. For his contributions, he was awarded the Shanti Swarup Bhatnagar Award and the Padma Shri. He is awarded Padma Bhushan in 2014
- Narayanan Chandrakumar, chemical physicist, Shanti Swarup Bhatnagar laureate
- Kalarical Janardhanan Sreeram, a CSIR Young Scientist Awardee, is the current Director of CSIR-CLRI since November 2019.
