= List of schools in Chennai =

The school system in Chennai consists of an array of structured systems. Children typically start school (junior or lower kindergarten) at the age of three, progressing to senior or upper kindergarten followed by twelve years of study. Class 10 and class 12 involve taking public examinations conducted by various accreditation boards. Most of the schools are accredited to Tamil Nadu State Board.

== Administrative categories ==
Chennai schools fall into two administrative categories - government schools called corporation schools, and privately run schools. Private schools fall under the following categories: schools with central board syllabus, schools with state board syllabus, schools with matriculation syllabus, schools with Anglo-Indian syllabus and schools with Oriental syllabus. In privately managed state board syllabus schools there are two categories: self-financing and government-aided schools. In some government-aided schools a few sections may also be self-financing. From the academic year of 2011, the Government of Tamil Nadu has brought in the "Samachiyar Kalvi" syllabus to replace Anglo-Indian, state, Oriental and matriculation modes of education. Now only the following syllabi are available in Tamil Nadu: Samachyar Kalvi, CBSE, ICSE and IGCSE.

== Medium of instruction ==
Most private schools are English medium (medium of instruction is English) while the government-run schools are primarily Tamil medium. The schools run by the central government have a dual medium of instruction - English and Hindi.

== Accreditation ==
All recognized schools belong to one of the following accreditation systems:

- Central Board of Secondary Education - for all years of study
- International General Certificate of Secondary Education - for all years of study
- National Institute of Open Schooling (NIOS)-for all years of study
- Tamil Nadu State Board - for all years of study
- Council for the Indian School Certificate Examinations - for all years of study
- Matriculation System for classes K-10 and automatically rolled over to Tamil Nadu State Board for classes 11 and 12
- Tamil Nadu Anglo-Indian System for classes K-10 and automatically rolled over to Tamil Nadu State Board for classes 11 and 12

Exceptions to the above rule include a few schools that follow the Montessori method, International Baccalaureate or the American system.

== Schools ==
Name	Neighbourhood	Administration	Accreditation or Affiliation
AVM Rajeswari School	AVM Nagar, Virugambakkam	Private	CBSE
Aachi Global School	Anna Nagar and Ayanambakkam	Private	Cambridge and CBSE
Adyar Public School	Adyar	Private	CBSE
Akshar Árbol International School	West Mambalam, T.Nagar	Private	International Education
AMM Matriculation Higher Secondary School	Kotturpuram	Private	Matriculation
American International School Chennai	Tharamani	Private	International Baccalaureate
Asan Memorial Senior Secondary School	Thousand Lights	Private	CBSE
Babaji Vidhyashram	Sholinganallur, OMR IT Highway	Private	CBSE
Bentinck School	Vepery	Private	Matriculation
Bharath Senior Secondary School	Adyar	Private	CBSE
Chennai Public School	Thirumazhisai and Anna Nagar	Private	IB, IGCSE, CBSE, Tamil Nadu State Board, Matriculation
Chettinad Vidyashram	R.A. Puram	Private	CBSE
Chintadripet Boys Higher Secondary School	Chintadripet	Government, aided	Tamil Nadu State Board
Chinmaya Vidyalaya	Anna Nagar, Virugambakkam, Taylor's Road	Private	CBSE
Christ Church Anglo-Indian Higher Secondary School	Anna Salai	Private	AISLC
C.S.I. Bain Matriculation Higher Secondary School	Kilpauk	Private	Matriculation
C.S.I. Ewart Matriculation Higher Secondary School	Purasawalkam	Private	Matriculation
D.A.V. Boys Senior Secondary School	Gopalapuram	Private	CBSE
D.A.V. Public School	Teynampet	Private	CBSE
Daniel Matriculation Higher Secondary School	Korukkupet	Private	Matriculation
Dawn School	Nolambur	Private	CBSE
Don Bosco Matriculation Higher Secondary School	Egmore	Catholic	Matriculation
Doveton Corrie Boys' Higher Secondary School	Vepery	Private	Anglo-Indian
École Franco-Indienne Sishya	Adyar	Private, French	ICSE and ISC
German International School, Chennai	Palavakkam	Private, German	ICSE and ISC
Gill Adarsh Matriculation Higher Secondary School	Royapettah	Private	Tamil Nadu State Board
G. K. Shetty Vivekananda Vidyalaya	Ambattur	Private	CBSE
Good Earth School	Manimangalam	Private	ICSE
Good Shepherd Convent	Nungambakkam	Private	ICSE
Government Madrasa-i-Azam Higher Secondary School	Anna Salai	Government	Tamil Nadu State Board
GT Vidhya Mandir	Thiruvallur District	Private	CBSE
GTA Vidhya Mandir	Neelankarai	Private	CBSE
Guru Nanak Mat.Hr.Sec School	Velachery	Government, aided	Tamil Nadu State Board
HLC International	Old Mahabalipuram Road	Private	IGCSE
Hiranandani Upscale School	Navalur	Private	International Baccalaureate
Hindu Higher Secondary School	Triplicane	Government, aided	Tamil Nadu State Board
Hindu Senior Secondary School	Indira Nagar	Private	CBSE
Holy Angels Anglo Indian Higher Secondary School	T Nagar	Private, Christian	Anglo-Indian
Holy Cross Matriculation School Chennai	Thiruvottiyur	Private	Matriculation
Jawahar Vidyalaya	Ashok Nagar	Private	CBSE
KC High School	Kotturpuram	Private	Cambridge, IB Candidate School
K. C. Sankaralinga Nadar Higher Secondary School	Old Washermanpet	Government, aided	Tamil Nadu State Board
Kerala Vidhyalayam Higher Secondary School	Kilpauk	Private	
Kendriya Vidyalaya IIT Chennai	IIT Madras	Government	CBSE
Kendriya Vidyalaya Senior Sec. School	CLRI Campus	Government	CBSE
Khivraj Olympia School	Thiruneermalai	Private	CBSE
La Chatelaine Junior College	Alwarthirunagar	Private	CBSE
Lady Andal Venkatasubba Rao Matriculation Higher Secondary School	Chetpet	Private	CBSE
Lalaji Memorial Omega International School	Kolapakkam	Private	CBSE
Loyola Matriculation Higher Secondary School	Kodambakkam	Catholic	Matriculation
Mahesh Education Institute	Alandur	Private	Matriculation
Maharishi Vidya Mandir	Chetput	Private	Matriculation and CBSE
M. C. C. Higher Secondary School	Chetput	Private	Tamil Nadu State Board
M. C. C. Public School	Chetput	Private	CBSE
MCTM International School	Chennai	Private	IB and IGCSE
Model Matriculation Higher Secondary School	Royapettah	Private, semi-residential	Matriculation
Muslim Higher Secondary School	Triplicane	State Government	Tamil Nadu State Board
N.S.N Memorial Senior Secondary School	Chromepet	Private	CBSE
National Public School	Gopalapuram	Private	CBSE
New Prince Matriculation Higher Secondary School	Madipakkam	Private	Matriculation
Olcott Memorial High School	Besant Nagar	Government	Tamil Nadu State Board
Our Lady's Matriculation Higher Secondary School	Thiruvottiyur	Private	Matriculation
P.S. Higher Secondary School	Mylapore	Government, aided	Tamil Nadu State Board
P.S. Senior Secondary School	Mylapore	Private	CBSE
Padma Seshadri Bala Bhavan Schools	Nungambakkam, K.K. Nagar, Siruseri	Private	CBSE
Pon Vidyashram	Valasaravakkam	Private	CBSE
Prince Matriculation Higher Secondary School	Madipakkam	Private	Matriculation
PSBB Millennium School	GST Road, Gerugambakkam	Private	CBSE
Railway Mixed Higher Secondary School	Perambur	Government	Tamil Nadu State Board
Rosary Matriculation Higher Secondary School	Santhome	Private	Matriculation
Rosily Matriculation Higher Secondary School	Chromepet	Private	Matriculation
RPC Matriculation Higher Secondary School	Thiruvottiyur	Private	Matriculation
San Academy CBSE School	Pallikaranai	Private	CBSE
Sethu Bhaskara Matriculation Higher Secondary School	Ambattur	Private	Matriculation
Sharanalaya Montessori School	Nungambakkam	Private	Montessori, CBSE
SBOA School & Junior College	Anna Nagar	Private, Semi-Residential	CBSE
Sir Sivaswami Kalalaya	Mylapore	Government	ICSE
Siragu Montessori School	Avadi	Private	Montessori
Sishya School	Adyar	Private	ICSE and ISC
Smart Minds Academy	West Mambalam	Private	NIOS
Sri Chaithanya Techno School	Manapakkam	Private	CBSE+TECHNO
Sri Sankara Senior Secondary School	Adyar	Private	CBSE
Sri Sankara Global Cambridge International School	Pammal	Private	Cambridge IGCSE
Sundravalli Memorial School	Chromepet	Private	CBSE
St. Bede's Anglo Indian Higher Secondary School	Santhome	Private	Anglo-Indian
St. Colomba's Girls Anglo-Indian Higher Secondary School	Parry's Corner	Private	Anglo-Indian
St Ebba's School	Mylapore	Private	CBSE
St. George's Anglo-Indian Higher Secondary School	Shenoy Nagar	Private	Anglo-Indian
St. John's English School & Junior College	Besant Nagar	Private	CBSE
St. John's Matriculation Higher Secondary School	Alwarthirunagar	Private	Matriculation
St. Joseph's Anglo-Indian Higher Secondary School	Perambur	Private, Catholic	Tamil Nadu State Board
St. Kevin's Anglo Indian Higher Secondary School	Royapuram	Private, Catholic	Anglo-Indian
St. Mary's Anglo-Indian Higher Secondary School	Parry's Corner	Private	Anglo-Indian
St. Matthias Anglo Indian Higher Secondary School	Vepery	Private	Matriculation
St. Patrick's Anglo Indian Higher Secondary School	Adyar	Private, Christian	Anglo-Indian
St. Paul's Higher Secondary School	Vepery	Private, Christian	CBSE
St. Theresa's Girls' Higher Secondary School	Pallavaram	Private, Catholic	Matriculation
The School KFI	Thazhambur	Private	ICSE
The PSBB Millennium School	GST Road, Gerugambakkam	Private	CBSE
Unity Public School	Kotturpuram	Private	CBSE
Valliammal Matriculation Higher Secondary School	Chennai	Private	Matriculation
Vanavani Matriculation Higher Secondary School	IIT Madras	Aided by IIT-Madras	Matriculation
V. Ramakrishna Polytechnic	Thiruvottiyur	Private	
Vani Vidyalaya Senior Secondary & Junior College	West K.K. Nagar	Private	CBSE
Vellalan Vidyalaya	Nungambakkam	Private	CBSE
Vellayan Chettiyar Higher Secondary School	Tiruvottiyur	Government, aided	Tamil Nadu State Board
Vedanta Academy	Vanagaram	Private	CBSE
Vidya Mandir Senior Secondary School	Mylapore	Private	CBSE
Vruksha International School of Montessori	Neelankarai	Private	Montessori
Vyasa Vidyalaya Matriculation Higher Secondary School	Adambakkam	Private	Matriculation
Wesley Higher Secondary School	Royapettah	Government, aided	Tamil Nadu State Board

== See also ==
- Chennai Corporation Schools
