= Education in Chennai =

Chennai is home to many educational and research institutions. IIT Madras, located in South Chennai is considered as the premier centre of engineering education in India. Anna University and the University of Madras are the oldest state owned universities which are ranked among the best universities in India. The College of Engineering, Guindy and Madras Institute of Technology, which are the constituent college of Anna University along with Alagappa College of Technology are the pioneer institutes of engineering education in India. Some of the oldest medical colleges India, the Madras Medical College (1835) and Stanley Medical College (1938) are located in the city. Notable, liberal arts colleges in the city include Loyola College, Madras Christian College, Presidency College, Stella Maris College, Women's Christian College and Ethiraj College for Women.

== Schools ==
Schools in Chennai are run publicly by the Tamil Nadu government, or run privately, some with financial aid from the government. The medium of education in private schools is English. Government run schools offer both English and Tamil medium education. Private schools are usually affiliated to the Tamil Nadu State Board or the Tamil Nadu Matriculation board. A few schools are affiliated to the national CBSE board, ICSE board, NIOS board, Anglo-Indian board and the Montessori system. A few schools also offer the International Baccalaureate and the American systems. Schooling begins at the age of three with two years of kindergarten, followed by ten years of primary and secondary education. Students then need to complete two years of higher secondary education in one of two streams: science or commerce, before being eligible for college education in a general or professional field of study. The sex education programme was made as a mandatory in Chennai schools and colleges for the first time in nearly two decades. This announcement was done by the city Mayor at a function to commemorate World AIDS Day. School Education Department of Government of Tamil Nadu announced that, from 2012 educational year onwards, the books for students are merged to reduce carrying loads of books. T.S Sridhar, Additional Chief Secretary to Government told that the number of books reduced as two for 7th and 8th std students and only one book up to 6th std. The state board system is often criticised due to the lack of quality it provides to the students comparing to world class education systems.

== Universities and Colleges ==
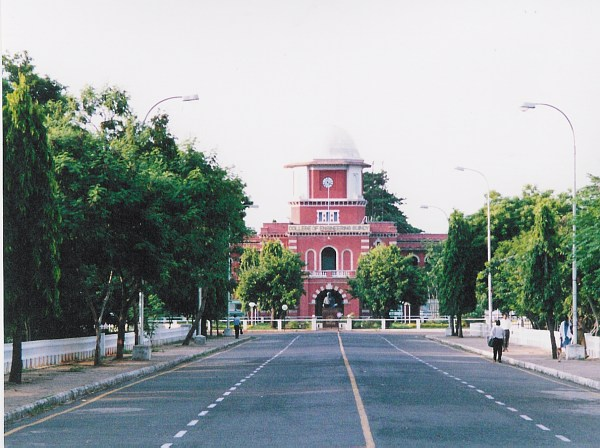
The main building of College of Engineering, Guindy

The Indian Institute of Technology Madras (1959), is one of the first 5 IIT's established in India. IIT Madras campus was carved out of a natural forest within the Guindy National Park. Located nearby, is the main campus of Anna University (1978), which formed from a merger of the College of Engineering, Guindy (1794), the Madras Institute of Technology (1949), the Alagappa College of Technology (1944), and the University of Madras School of Architecture and Planning (1957). Almost all colleges in Tamil Nadu that offer programs in engineering, technology and architecture are affiliated to Anna University. The remaining colleges are autonomous deemed universities.

The state-owned Madras University (1857), which has six campuses in the city, offers more than 230 courses under 87 academic departments of post-graduate teaching and research grouped under 18 schools, covering diverse areas such as sciences, social sciences, humanities, management and medicine along with 121 affiliated colleges and 53 approved research institutions. Some of the earliest affiliated colleges are the Madras Christian College (1837), Presidency College (1840), Pachaiyappa's College (1842), Madras Sanskrit College (1906), Queen Mary's College (1914), Women's Christian College (1915), Loyola College, Chennai (1925), Vivekananda College (1946), Stella Maris College (1947), The New College (1951), JBAS College for Women (1951) and the Madras School of Social Work (1953).

Other prominent self-financed educational establishments include Amrita Vishwa Vidyapeetham (1994), Vellore Institute of Technology (1984), SSN College of Engineering(1996), SRM Institute of Science and Technology (1985), Hindustan Institute of Maritime Training (HIMT) (1998), Hindustan Institute of Technology and Science (1985), Bharath Institute of Higher Education and Research (1984), Sathyabama Institute of Science and Technology (1987), B.S. Abdur Rahman Crescent Institute of Science and Technology (1984), Academy of Maritime Education and Training (1992), Asian College of Journalism (2000).

The Dr. Ambedkar Government Law College, Chennai, a prominent law college in the state was founded in 1891 under the Madras University, is now affiliated with Tamil Nadu Dr. Ambedkar Law University (TNDALU). Madras Medical College, established in 1835, is one of the oldest educational institutions to offer medical education in the Indian subcontinent. Stanley Medical College, Kilpauk Medical College and Sri Ramachandra Medical College and Research Institute are other well known medical colleges in the city affiliated with Tamil Nadu Dr. M.G.R. Medical University.

Madras School of Art (1850) and Madras Veterinary College (1903) are the first institutions of their kind in India. These, institutions formed the nucleus of recently constituted Tamil Nadu Music and Fine Arts University (TNMFAU) and Tamil Nadu Veterinary and Animal Sciences University (TANUVAS) respectively. Other recently established state universities in Chennai include, Tamil Nadu Teachers Education University (TNTEU), Tamil Nadu Open University (TNOU) and the Tamil Nadu Physical Education and Sports University (TNPESU), which primarily operates as the affiliating universities.

== Research Institutions ==
Chennai is home to many research institutions. The world's largest organization for leather research, the Central Leather Research Institute, is located in Adyar. It is one of 39 constituent laboratory of the Council of Scientific and Industrial Research, India and is the premier institution of education and research in the leather sector in India. Second, CSIR laboratory Structural Engineering Research Centre, which is an important centre for design and construction research in India, is located in Taramani. Centres for research in pure mathematics and computer sciences include the Institute of Mathematical Sciences (IMSc), Ramanujan Institute for Advanced Study in Mathematics (RIASM) and the Chennai Mathematical Institute (CMI). The National Institute for Research in Tuberculosis (ICMR-NIRT) and National Institute of Epidemiology (ICMR-NIE) are the two ICMR institutes in Chennai. Prominent economics and financial research institutes in the city are the Institute for Financial Management and Research and the Madras School of Economics.

The centrally funded institutions are National Institute of Ocean Technology (NIOT), Indian Institute of Information Technology Design & Manufacturing (IIIT-DM), National Institute of Fashion Technology (NIFT), National Institute of Technical Teachers' Training and Research (NITTTR), National Institute of Siddha, Kalakshetra Foundation, Madras Institute of Development Studies (MIDS), Central Institute of Classical Tamil (CCICT), Dakshina Bharat Hindi Prachar Sabha, Indian Maritime University, Central Institute of Plastics Engineering and Technology (CIPET) Rajiv Gandhi National Institute of Youth Development (RGNIYD), Regional Meteorological Centre (RMC), National Centre for Sustainable Coastal Management (NCSCM), Central Institute of Brackishwater Aquaculture (ICAR-CIBA) and the Officers Training Academy is also headquartered in Chennai.

The campuses of the Academy of Scientific and Innovative Research (AcSIR), Central Scientific Instruments Organisation (CSIO), Central Electro Chemical Research Institute (CECRI), Central Electronics Engineering Research Institute, National Metallurgical Laboratory (NML), National Environmental Engineering Research Institute (NEERI) and Indian Statistical Institute (ISI) are also located in Chennai. Some other research institutes located in Chennai are the Adyar Cancer Institute, King Institute of Preventive Medicine and Research (KIPM), National Institute of Wind Energy (NIWE), Combat Vehicles Research and Development Establishment (CVRDE), MS Swaminathan Research Foundation (MSSRF), Madras Diabetes Research Foundation (MDRF), Siddha Central Research Institute (SCRI), Schizophrenia Research Foundation (SCARF), and International Institute of Tamil Studies (IITS) among others.

== Libraries ==
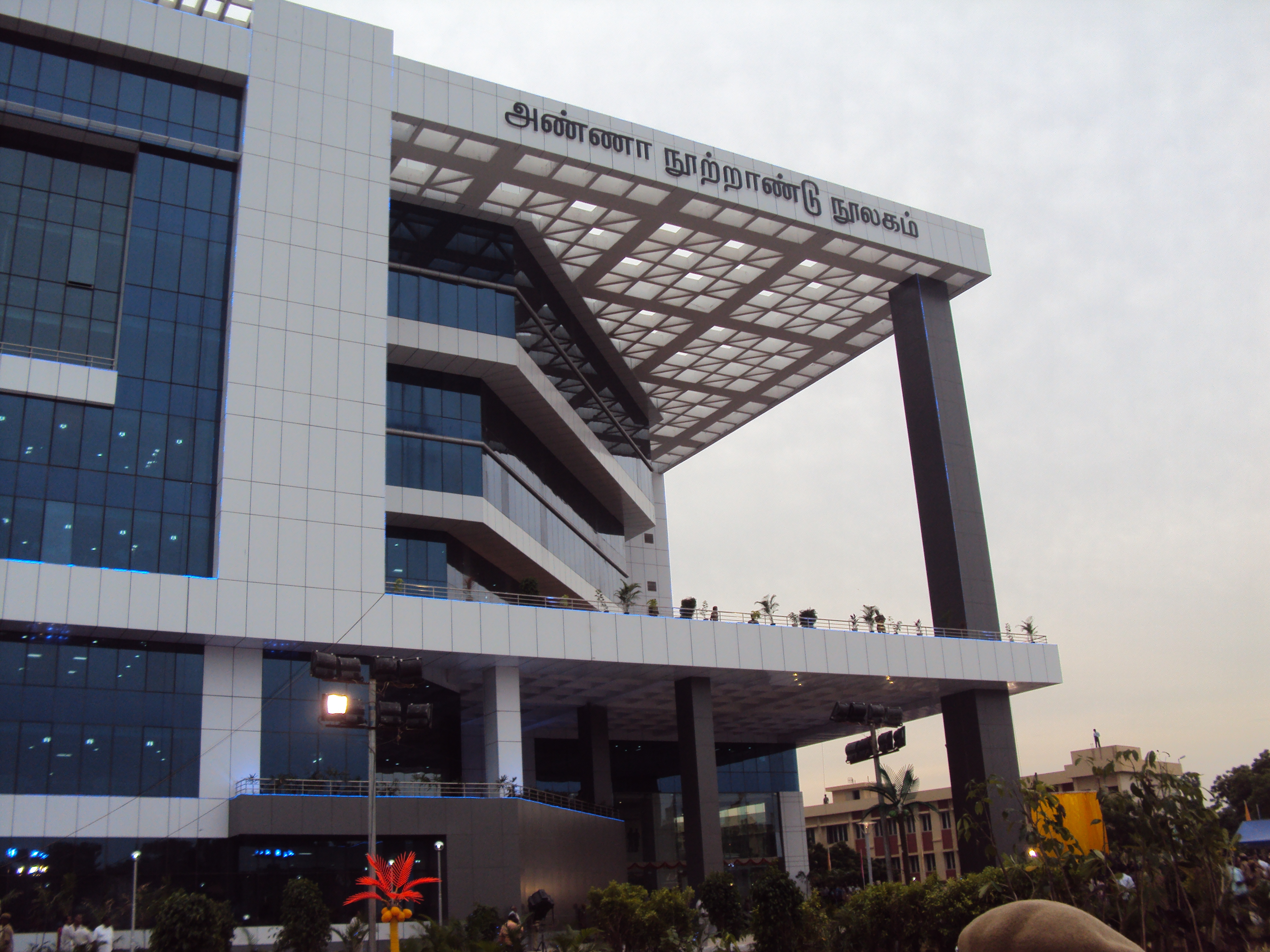
Anna Centenary Library

The Connemara Public Library built in 1890 is one of the four National Depository Centres in India. These centres receive a copy of all newspapers and books published in India. It has been declared as a UNESCO information centre. The Anna Centenary Library (ACL) is a newly established library, located at Kotturpuram in Chennai. Built at a cost of 1,720 million, it is one of the largest library in Asia. Large academic libraries accessible to the general public include the central libraries at IIT Madras and the Madras University. Other important libraries include Roja Muthiah Research Library, Mohammedan Public Library in Triplicane, the Archaeological Survey of India Library at the Fort St. George, the Adyar Library under the Theosophical Society Adyar, the Ramakrishna Math Library and the Krishnamurti Foundation Library in the premises of the Krishnamurti Foundation world headquarters.

== Weekend education ==
Japanese School Educational Trust of Chennai (チェンナイ補習授業校 Chennai Hoshū Jugyō Kō), a Japanese weekend education programme, serves Japanese nationals living in Chennai. It is located at American International School Chennai, Taramani. Established by the Japanese Association in Chennai (チェンナイ日本人会 Chennai Nihonjin Kai), it opened in June 1975 as The Japanese Class of Madras (マドラス日本語補習教室 Madorasu Nihongo Hoshū Kyōshitsu). In 1998 the school adopted the name Japanese Language School of Chennai (チェンナイ日本語補習校 Chennai Nihongo Hoshū Jugyō Kō) since Madras took the name Chennai.
