= Education in Tamil Nadu =

Education system in Tamilnadu, India

Government of Tamil Nadu
- Department of School Education (Tamil Nadu), Department of Higher Education (Tamil Nadu),: Department of Employment and Training (Commissionerate of Employment and Training)

General details
- Primary languages: Tamil, English
- System type: state

Enrollment (2010)
- Total: 12855485
- Primary: 9797264
- Secondary: 1873989
- Post secondary: 1184232

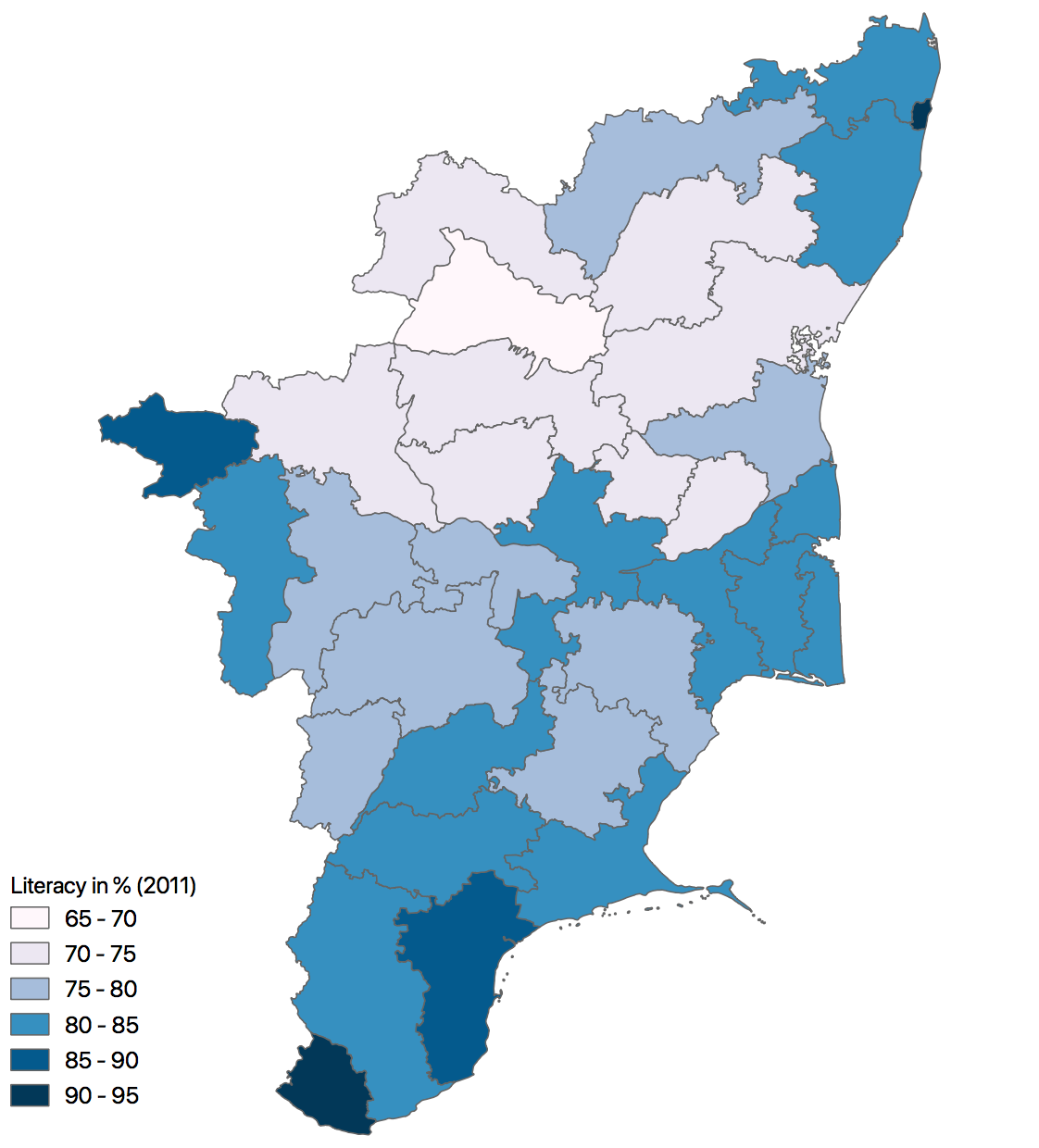
District level literacy (2011 data)

Tamil Nadu is one of the most literate states in India. The state's literacy rate is 80.33% in 2011, which is above the national average. A survey conducted by the Industry body Assocham ranks Tamil Nadu top among Indian states with about 100% Gross Enrollment Ratio (GER) in primary and upper primary education.

== Education Administration or Authority ==
- Tamil Nadu Government
  - Tamil Nadu Higher Education Department
  - Tamil Nadu School Education Department
- Union Government
  - University Grants Commission (India)
  - All India Council for Technical Education

== School education ==
The structure of education in the state is based on the national level pattern with 12 years of schooling (10+2+3), consisting of eight years of elementary education, that is, five years of primary and three years of middle school education for the age groups of 6-11 and 11–14 years, respectively, followed by secondary and higher Secondary education of two years each besides two years of pre-primary education. The entry age in class 1 is 5+. Pre-primary classes form age group 3 to 4. The higher secondary school certificate enables pupils to pursue studies either in universities or in colleges for higher education in general academic streams and in technical and professional courses.

Education in Tamil Nadu has been a challenge of access and relevancy. The state ranks 12th for literacy for men and 13th in literacy for women. These statistics appear satisfactory, the dropout rate of 21% is still of concern, although less than the national average. The dropout rates for children aged 5–18 are higher for girls (35.3%) than boys (26.7%). Rural students endure hardship in accessing education. For instance, in the towns of Dharmapuriand Arco, students often may need to walk anywhere from "3-6 km to reach a middle or highschool". The disparaging statistics also cut along religion and caste. Notably, Christian children are less likely to drop out of school from ages 5–18, than Hindu children that are backwards and scheduled castes. In order to understand the cause for these disparities, one must explore the history of education in the state.

In pre-colonial times, Brahmin children (of both genders) were taught "elementary education" by a tutor at home inside the agraharam. A watercolor painting called "Hindu school at Poona" depicts children studying. As seen in the picture, the school is confined within the agraharam and there are children of both genders. Children of other castes, sometimes, went to "government elementary schools in nearby villages". People who were not Brahmin weren't allowed inside the agraharam. This level of caste separation continued into colonial times. Educated people like scholar, teachers, and bureaucrats were Brahmins. Specifically, men who were Brahmin were more likely to be "literate in vernacular languages and sometimes Sanskrit". Eventually the shift from wanting an eastern education to an English education happened in the Maratha Kingdom of Tanjore. At the turn of the 19th century, the Maratha Deshastha and Telugu Niyogis were far more prominent than the Tamil Brahmins. The Deshatha's were a "strong, tight knit group" and had "long experience with administration". This group would eventually decline and in their space the Tamil Brahmin's would take over. The first sign of this change was when the Maratha's added English to their education. Another sign was the grand opening of Madras High School in 1841. This school was one of "the first attempts to disseminate Western education in South India". Schools like these allowed the Tamil Brahmins to rise from "lowly positions" to "Madras government service" and "deputy collector" and eventually become "the core of a new administrative elite". The Tamil Brahmins mostly went into sectors of medicine and engineering. Although, engineering prospects were low because the Public Works Department was hesitant about employing Indians.

After independence, there were efforts made to make education access more available to people of lower classes. The Madras state government created a 25% quota for "college places and government jobs". This allowed people of Other Backwards Classes (OBC) to get more seats. In 1980, the quota increased to 50% which had a special note about 18% of that 50% should be for Scheduled Castes and Scheduled Tribes. Although, this system of quotas was not perfect as it resulted in "lower-middle-class Brahmins…without good education qualifications" from getting secure government jobs. In private colleges, these brahmins usually have to pay "high capitation fees'" in order to get a seat. The gender gap in education however was not as easy of a solution. Women's marriage prospects were regarded as more important than their education until "the end of the twentieth century". In the 20th century, even "Brahmin girlswere rarely educated beyond primary school". The push for women's education coincided with marriage prospects as more educated men wanted wives who were educated. This allowed for women to start going to secondary school, college, and higher education.

One of the biggest populations that suffered and are still suffering from accessibility of education is the rural population in Tamil Nadu. Most of Tamil Nadu's population (60%) survives on "low-productivity agriculture". The wages from this type of work can be "very low", which affects the quality of education that children who belong to agricultural families can acquire. One solution to this problem was the Noon Meal Programme. This program was implemented in "rural areas of Tamil Nadu" in June 1982. This allowed students to get a "daily freenutritious meal of 400-odd calories". The program was first given to children ages 2–10 years. It was extended to all "pre-primary and elementary schools in Tamil Nadu". Not only did this program give an incentive for rural families to send their children to school, it reduced the dropout rates by 90% in July 1982. It also "increased enrollment in primary schools" by 70%.

=== Enrollment ===
There were a total of 12,855,485 children enrolled across the state as of 2010, with 9,797,264 students in primary, 1,873,989 in secondary and 1,184,232 in higher secondary classrooms.

=== Tamil Nadu Board of Secondary Education ===
Tamil Nadu Board of Secondary Education, established in 1910, is under the purview of the Department of Education, Government of Tamil Nadu, India. The State Board of School Examinations (Sec.) & Board of Higher Secondary Examinations, Tamil Nadu (SBSEBHSE) also known as State Common Board School Education evaluates students' progress by conducting three board examinations-one at the end of class 10 and the others at the end of class 11 & 12. The scores from the class 12 (combined with the class 11)board examinations are used by universities to determine eligibility and as a cut-off for admissions into their programmes.

=== Medium of instruction ===
Common:

- Tamil & English are common medium languages. Most private schools' medium of instruction is English, while the schools run by the Government are primarily Tamil medium.

Peculiar Cases:

- The Kendriya Vidyalaya's run by the Union Government of India have a dual medium of instruction: English and Hindi.

=== Accreditation ===
All recognized schools belong to one of the following accreditation systems:

- Central Board of Secondary Education - for all years of study
- Council for the Indian School Certificate Examinations - for all years of study
- Tamil Nadu State Board - for all years of study
- Matriculation System for classes K - 10 and automatically rolled over to Tamil Nadu State Board for classes 11 and 12.
- Tamil Nadu Anglo-Indian School Leaving Certificate for classes K - 10 and automatically rolled over to Tamil Nadu State Board for classes 11 and 12.

Exceptions to the above rule include a few schools that follow the Montessori method, International Baccalaureate, IGCSE or the American system.

=== Directorates ===
The Minister of Education, who is a member of the state legislature, is in overall charge of education in the state. The following Directorates implement those education aspects which are under the control of the School Education Department.

- Directorate of Elementary Education
- Directorate of Government Examinations
- Directorate of Matriculation Schools
- Directorate of Non-formal and Adult Education
- Directorate of Public Libraries
- Directorate of School Education
- Directorate of Teacher Education, Research and Training
- State Project Directorate, District Primary Education Programme and SSA
- Teachers Recruitment Board
- Tamil Nadu Text-book Corporation
- State Project Directorate, Rashtriya Madhyamik Shiksha Abhiyan (RMSA)

=== Government of Tamil Nadu's scheme ===
Some of the schemes introduced by the Tamil Nadu government in school education are

- Computer education
- Early Childhood Care and Education (ECCE)
- Girls education
- Integrated Education for the Disabled (IED)
- Kasturba Gandhi Ballka Vidyalaya (KGBV)
- Mid-day Meal Scheme
- National Programme of Education for Girls at Elementary Level (NPEGEL)
- Educational satellite (EDUSAT)
- Distribution of free textbooks
- Distribution of free uniforms
- Distribution of free bus pass

== ITI Education ==
- ITI Certificate (Industrial Training Institute) - Regulated by Department of Employment and Training (Commissionerate of Employment and Training) and National Council for Vocational Training

== Higher education ==
Tamil Nadu has 37 universities, 552 (in 2014) engineering colleges. and 1150 arts college, 2550 schools and 5000 hospitals. Tamil Nadu Directorate Of Technical Education (TNDTE) under the control of the Tamil Nadu Higher Education Department deals with Diploma, Post Diploma, Degree, Post Graduate courses and Research programmes. It also regulates the establishment of technical institutions including commerce institutions such as Typewriting, Shorthand and Accountancy.

=== Universities ===
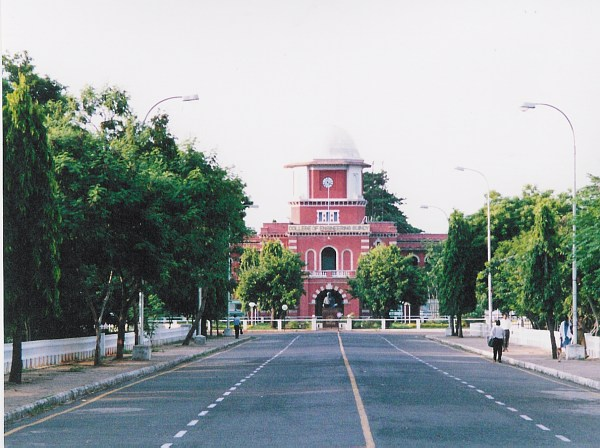
College of Engineering, Guindy, the oldest engineering school of India

Two types of universities in Tamil Nadu are,

- Public University or Government University. It is run by State Governments of Union of India or Government of Union of India
- Private University or Deemed University

== See also ==
- Tamil Nadu
- Education in Chennai
- Education in India
- State Board Of School Examinations (Sec.) & Board Of Higher Secondary Examinations, Tamil Nadu (SBSEBHSE)
- Education in Kerala
- List of Tamil Nadu Government's Educational Institutions
- Tamilnadu government colleges
- Tamil Nadu Higher Education Department
