= Smart Cookie (film series) =

- DVD cover
- Production company: Gyanni Inc.
- Running time: 38 minutes (volume 1); 52 minutes (volume 2); 60 minutes (volume 3)
- Country: India
- Language: English

Smart Cookie is an Indian English-language VCD series made by Shemaroo Entertainment. The films are educational and targeted for kids ages one to seven. The first volume Pyjama Party (2002) won bronze at ‘The American Telly Awards 2006’ and was recognized at ‘Kids First USA’. The series was successful in educating preschools. The Indian preschool franchise Podar Jumbo Kids used the Smart Cookie video series as a part of their programme.

== Plot ==
=== Vol 1: Pyjama Party ===
Aavni and Jasu joins their friends in the park for a party. Liyashree says that she is thirsty and one of the friends tries to scare her with a fake spider. Chinnu then gives his friends lollipops. Their hands get sticky from the lollipops. Jasu asks Mansi to help him was his hands. One of the friends finds an innovative way to wash his hands using the outdoor sprinkler. All the other kids follow suit and get themselves wet. All the friends go inside Kavya and Siya's house and get themselves dried. Kavya's mother ask wat fruit they each want in their fruit salad. Kavya's mother makes the fruit salad and tops it off with ice cream and a cherry. The kids then learn about the alphabet before having a pyjama party. They then clean up after themselves and go to bed. The next day, the kids then learn about colors, actions and body parts.

=== Vol 2: Yay! Yay! It's Picnic Day ===
Jasu wakes up Aavni and tells her to get up because it's picnic day. Their mother tells them to go back to sleep. They meets their friends in the park and learn about numbers before going to play. The friends start popping bubbles when one of the friends jumps into Jasu knocking him down, injuring his hand. The kids start playing and when they ask what game do they want to play next, Kavya suggests London Bridge. The kids then tell Jasu and Aavni's mother wat they want to eat and they analyze the shapes of their foods. The kids eat watermelon but flies come in their way. One of the friends is playing with Siya's ball and Siya complains to Aavni and Jasu's mother. Aavni tells Siya that is okay to share. The kids then see a bunny before they have to pack up and go home. A clown hand puppet appears on screen and teaches the audience about vegetables and shapes.

=== Vol 3: Birthday Fun ===
Siya and Kavya made a cake for Kavya's birthday. Their mother tells Kavya to go run some errands with their father. Kavya and Siya's friends come over and help decorate the house for Kavya's birthday. Kavya comes back to the house with her father and is surprised by her friends. The kids finish eating the birthday cake and then eat pav bhaji. One of the friends talks while eating pav bhaji and the other kids sing about how you should not talk while you are eating. Kiko, a clown comes and gives all the kids Jell-O. Jasu drops his Jell-O and Siya offers part of her Jell-O to him. Kiko wants to play Simon Says and Kavya chooses her father to be Simon. Kavya then opens her gifts. A clown hand puppet then teaches the audience about days of the week, emotions, clothes, about using the words please and thank you, and eating habits.

== Cast and characters ==
List indicator

This section includes characters who will appear or have appeared in the franchise.

- An empty grey cell indicates the character was not in the film, or that the character's official presence has not yet been confirmed.

Characters	Films		
Characters	Vol 1: Pyjama Party	Vol 2: Yay! Yay! It's Picnic Day	Vol 3: Birthday Fun
Aavni "Aavu"	Aavni Piparsania	Aavni Piparsania	Aavni Piparsania
Siya	Siya Piparsania	Siya Piparsania	Siya Piparsania
Layashree	Layashree Joshi	Layashree Joshi	Layashree Joshi
Pranay	Pranay Kejriwal	Pranay Kejriwal	Pranay Kejriwal
Ved	Ved Mathai	Ved Mathai	Ved Mathai
Chinnapa "Chinnu"	P. P. Chinnapa	P. P. Chinnapa	P. P. Chinnapa
Mansi	Mansi Bhatia	Mansi Bhatia	Mansi Bhatia
Jasu	Jasraj Bhatia	Jasraj Bhatia	Jasraj Bhatia
Kavya	Kavya Sivan	Kavya Sivan	Kavya Sivan
Aavni and Jasu's mother	Hansa Piparsania	Hansa Piparsania	Hansa Piparsania
Kavya and Siya's mother	Deepa Rajagopal		Deepa Rajagopal
Kavya and Siya's father	Godwin Bernard		Rohit
Aavni and Jasu's father		Venkatesh	
Teacher		Rukmani Sivan	
Kiko			Magudi

== Crew ==
Occupation	Film		
Occupation	Vol 1: Pyjama Party (2002)	Vol 2: Yay! Yay! It's Picnic Day (2004)	Vol 3: Birthday Fun (2004)
Director	K. P. Sathyan	Deepa Rajagopal; Padma Nagarajan	Deepa Rajagopal; Padma Nagarajan
Producer(s)	Murthy Sivan	Murthy Sivan	Murthy Sivan
Screenplay	K. P. Sathyan	Deepa Rajagopal; Padma Nagarajan	Deepa Rajagopal; Padma Nagarajan
Scriptwriter	Deepa Rajagopal	Deepa Rajagopal	Deepa Rajagopal
Cinematography	Daniel Xavier	Daniel Xavier	Daniel Xavier
Editor	Franklin	Franklin	Franklin
Composer(s)	Godwin Bernard	Godwin Bernard	Godwin Bernard

== Production ==
Deepa Rajagopal went on a trip to India and noticed the lack of content relating to teaching young kids manners in English. She decided to make a series of films, which featured her daughter Kavya and herself.

== Soundtrack ==
The music was composed by Godwin Bernard.

Vol 1: Pyjama Party
No.	Title	Singer(s)	Length
1.	"Title Song"	Christina

Vol 3: Birthday Fun
No.	Title	Length
1.	"Sunday Monday Tuesday"	0:58
2.	"Pat a Cake Pat a Cake"	1:39
3.	"Say Say My Playmate"	1:13
4.	"Please And Thank You"	0:58
5.	"Hickory Dickory Dock"	1:21
6.	"Happy Birthday Song"	0:42
7.	"Two Little Dicky Birds"	1:14

== Reception ==
Anuradha Kishore Ganapati of India Currents wrote that "Rajagopal's simple and unpretentious approach makes it easy for preschoolers to relate to her videos". The film series was well received by Indian parents of toddlers living in India and other places such as Singapore and the United States.

=== Vol 1: Pyjama Party ===
"After the excitement of the show settled I was shocked to see the rapt attention. Children were soaking up the program, smiles and brightening of eyes spread through the room. Even before we knew it, the children were singing along and waving their hands to the actions shown on screen"

— Meenakshi Viswanathan, LKG and UKG teacher at Sishya School, Chennai

A critic from The Hindu wrote that "Weaving together fun filled activities that children would love to part of into a story of eight friends at a sleepover, the video offers, popular nursery rhymes, introduction to the alphabet, numbers, colours and fruits, everyday actions, parts of the body, and good habit and manners". A critic from The New Indian Express wrote that "This 65-minute video is filled with popular nursery rhymes like Itsy Bitsy Spider, Here we Go Around the Mulberry Bush and Are You Sleeping Brother John….The video also introduces letters, number, colours and fruits to children. What's more, the video shows several instances emphasizing good habits and manners. That way your kid turns into a polite smart cookie". Omana Thomas, the principal of Sishya School, Chennai, said that "'children were soaking it up;smiling and brightening up. Even before we knew it, they were singing along and waving their hands to the actions on the screen…What caught my attention was the flow of subjects, and familiarity of the surroundings'".

=== Vol 2: Yay! Yay! It's Picnic Day ===
A critic from The Indian Express wrote that "In this installment of Smart Cookies, the kids go for a picnic in the park. Their title song Yay! Yay! It's picnic day is contagious, they will have you singing in no time".

=== Vol 3: Birthday Fun ===
A critic from The Indian Express wrote that "There is the classic happy birthday song that should bring back memories of your favorite day and all the presents".
