= Don Bosco Matriculation Higher Secondary School, Chennai =

Coordinates: 13.069678°N 80.254312°E

Don Bosco Matric Hr Sec School
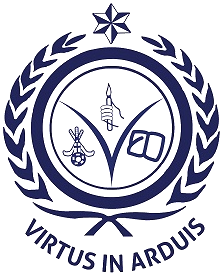

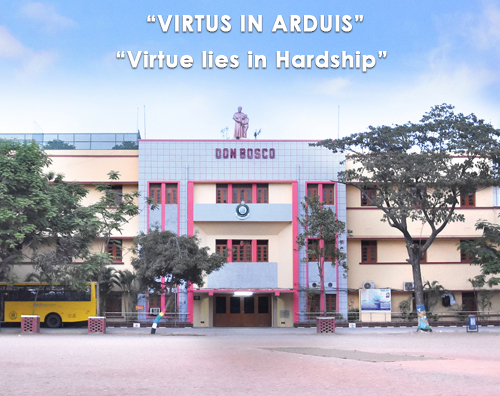

Location
- 13, Casa Major Road; Egmore; Chennai, Tamil Nadu, 600008; India

Information
- School type: Boys Matriculation School
- Motto: Virtus in Arduis (Virtue lies in Hardship)
- Religious affiliation: Salesians of Don Bosco (SDB)
- Patron saint: St. John Bosco
- Established: 1958
- Founder: Rev. Fr. Mallon
- School board: Tamil Nadu State Board
- School district: Chennai
- Rector: Rev.Fr.Philip Maria Alphonse Raj SDB
- Principal: Rev.Fr.Suresh Kumar Lourdusamy SDB
- Headmaster: Mr. L. Selvaraj (AHM)
- Teaching staff: 80
- Language: English
- Song: DB Egmore School Anthem
- Nickname: DB Egmore
- Affiliation: State Board School Examinations (Sec.) & Board of Higher Secondary Examinations
- Website: www.dbegmore.com

Don Bosco Matriculation Higher Secondary School is located in Egmore, Chennai. The school was established in July 1958 with 140 students and Fr. Mallon as the principal and has since grown to over 5000 students. This School was founded in 1959 as a Matriculation School affiliated with the University of Madras and it obtained its recognition vide letter p.A983 dated 19 March 1959. From 13 November 1978, it came under the jurisdiction and recognition of a separate Board of Matriculation Schools. On 1 July 1978, it was upgraded as a Higher Secondary School and recognition was granted to the Higher Secondary Section by the Director of School Education in his proceedings, D.Dis.No.75466/W5/78 dt. 2.4.1979. The school is affiliated to matriculation system of Tamil Nadu until class 10 and the Tamil Nadu State Board for classes 11 and 12.

== Notable alumni ==
- Silambarasan, actor
- Prabhas, actor
- Viswanathan Anand, chess grandmaster and world champion
- Vijay Amritraj, Tennis Professional
- Y. Gee. Mahendra, actor
- Dinesh Karthik, Indian cricketer
- Arjan Kripal Singh, Indian cricketer
- Arvind Swamy, actor
- Daggubati Venkatesh, actor
- D. Imman, music composer
- Sibiraj, actor
- Vikram Prabhu, actor
- Vishal, actor
- Krish J Sathaar, actor
- Daggubati Suresh Babu, film producer
- Kuthethurshri Vasudevadas, cricketer
- Vijay Kumar, spiritual guru
- Keshav R Murugesh, business leader
- Dayanidhi Maran, politician
- Udhayanidhi Stalin, politician
- Sanjay Pinto, business leader
- Sashi Kumar, media personality
- Kalanithi Maran, business man
- Venu Srinivasan, businessman

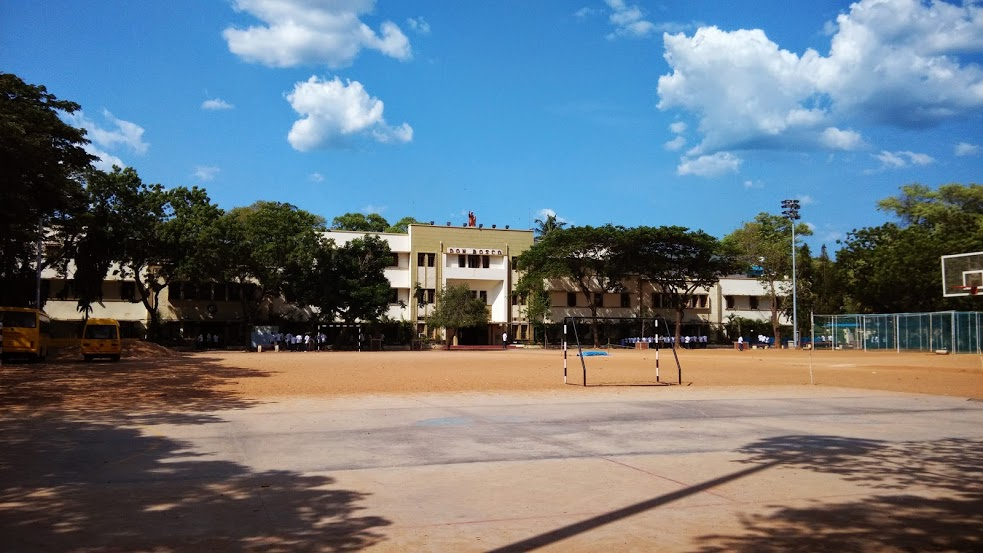
Picture of Don Bosco Matriculation Higher Secondary School, Egmore
