= Adyar, Chennai =

Neighborhood of Chennai, India

Adyar Adayar
- neighbourhood
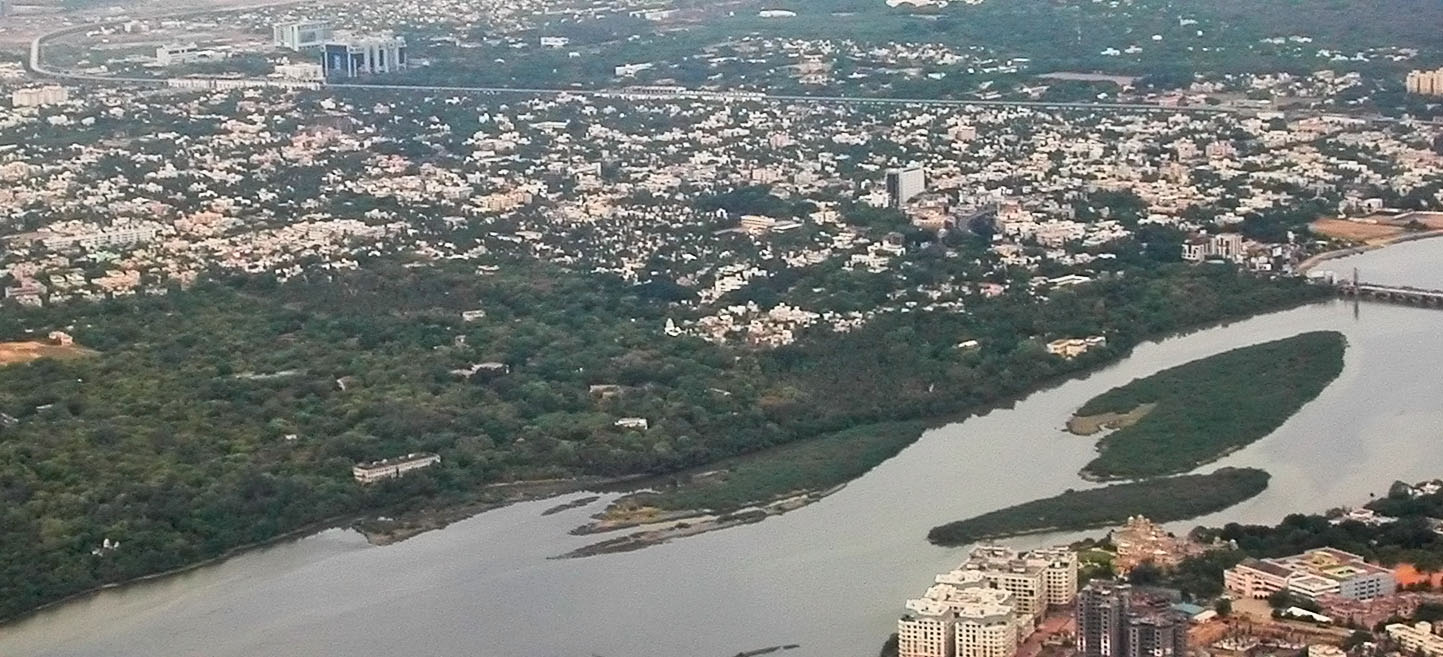
- A view of Adyar and Adyar Creek

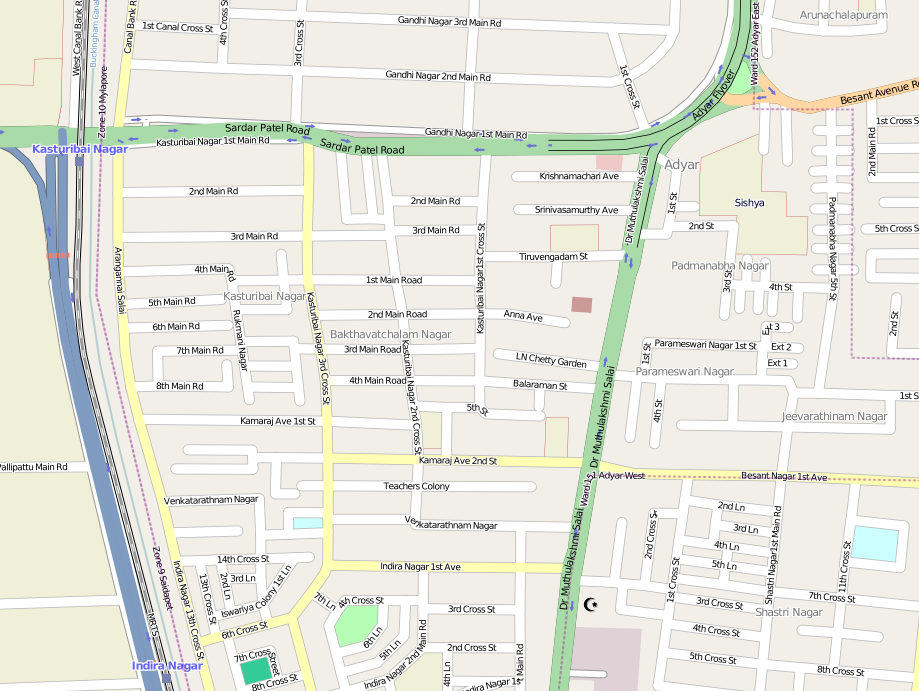
- Locality map of Adyar

- Location within Chennai
- Coordinates: 13.0063°N 80.2574°E
- Country: India
- State: Tamil Nadu
- District: Chennai
- Metro: Chennai

Government
  - Body: CMDA

Languages
  - Official: Tamil, English
- Time zone: UTC+5:30 (IST)
- PIN: 600020
- Vehicle registration: TN-07
- Parliamentary constituency: Chennai South
- Assembly constituency: Mylapore
- Planning agency: CMDA

Adyar is a large neighbourhood in south Chennai, Tamil Nadu, India. It is among the most upscale neighborhoods of the city.

It is located on the southern banks of the Adyar River. It is surrounded by the Tharamani to the West, Thiruvanmiyur to the South, Besant Nagar to the East, Kotturpuram to the North-West and Raja Annamalai puram to the North across the Adyar River. Property values in Adyar are four times that of similar sized properties in the northern part of Chennai. The Gandhi Nagar region of Adyar is one of the poshest localities in Chennai.

== History ==
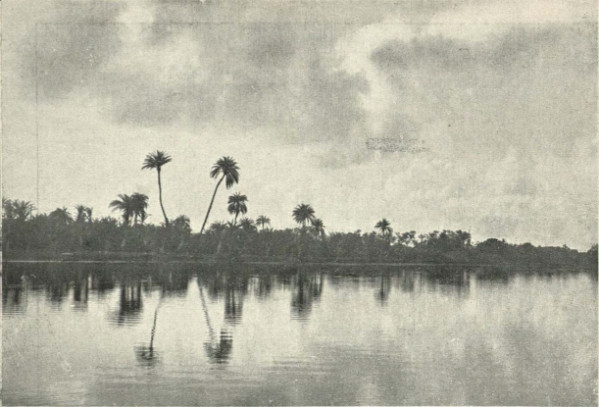
The Adyar River, c. 1905

=== Etymology ===
The neighbourhood gets its name from the Adyar River, which flows through its northern limits. The term Adyar is the anglicized form of the Tamil word aḍai-ārŭ (lit. clogged-river), which is colloquially just pronounced as aḍayār.

=== British India ===
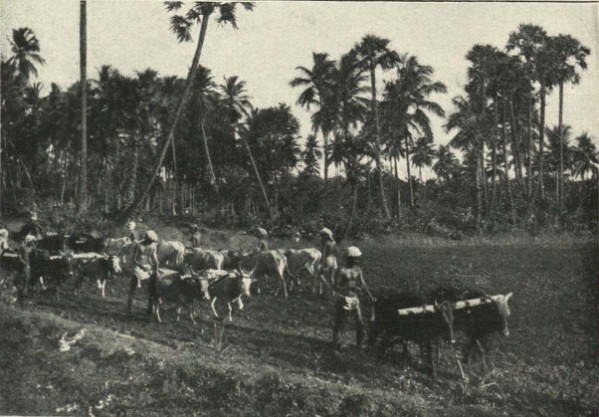
Teams of Bullocks Ploughing at Adyar village, c. 1905

Adyar and the neighbouring Guindy had been used as hunting grounds by British officials of Fort St. George from the 1680s onwards though Adyar is first mentioned as a suburb of Madras only in a map from the year 1740 when the British purchased the village and integrated it with the Madras Presidency.

Adyar started to grow rapidly at the turn of the 20th century following the founding of the headquarters of the Theosophical Society by Mrs. Helena Blavatsky here in 1883. Following the establishment of the Theosophical Society headquarters, the Kalakshetra, a cultural organisation to promote traditional arts and culture was established by Rukmini Devi Arundale at Adyar in 1936. The 1931 census records Adyar as a zamindari village in Kancheepuram district. Adyar was included within the Chennai Corporation limits in 1948.

== Geography ==
As of 2018, Adyar zone had a green cover of 30.1 percent, as against the city's 14.9 percent average. This was the highest green cover recorded in the city. The Adyar River divides Raja Annamalaipuram and Adyar in the North and the Buckingham Canal divides Kotturpuram and Tharamani in the northwest and west, respectively.

== Transport ==
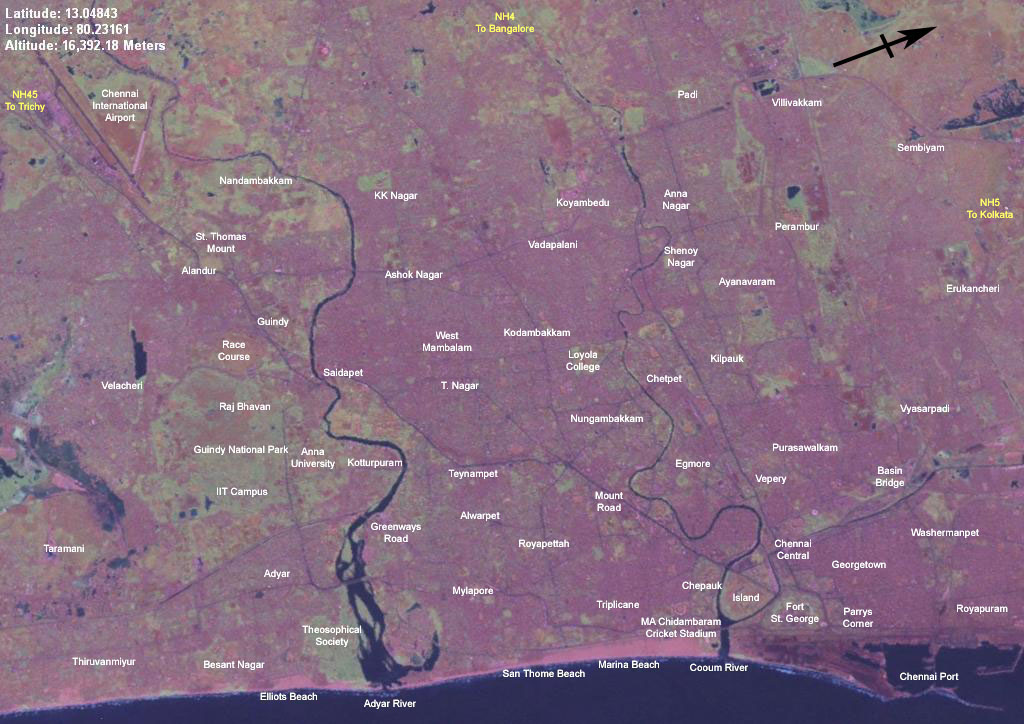
Adyar is situated on a flat coastal plain, near Adyar river

The Mass Rapid Transit System (Chennai) runs through Adyar and has three stations within the neighbourhood – Kasturbai Nagar, Indira Nagar and Thiruvanmiyur. Adyar has a bus depot operating both intra-city and inter-city buses.

=== Roads ===
- The Sardar Patel Road also called the Durgabai Deshmukh Road in its eastern end runs in an East–West fashion and connects Guindy and Raja Annamalaipuram respectively.
- The Lattice Bridge Road (LB Road) that runs in a North–South fashion, starting from Adyar signal at Sardar Patel road up to East Coast Road junction (Thiruvanmiyur Signal) at Thiruvanmiyur is an important arterial road of Adyar.

== Landmarks ==
- The Theosophical Society, is headquartered in Adyar. The campus, located on the south bank of the Adyar river provides a calm environment for quiet contemplation on comparative religion.
- The Adyar estuary has been home to over a hundred species of birds but has been affected by urbanization. The Adyar Eco Park was set up by the Government of Tamil Nadu in January 2011 to restore this fragile eco-system to its natural state.

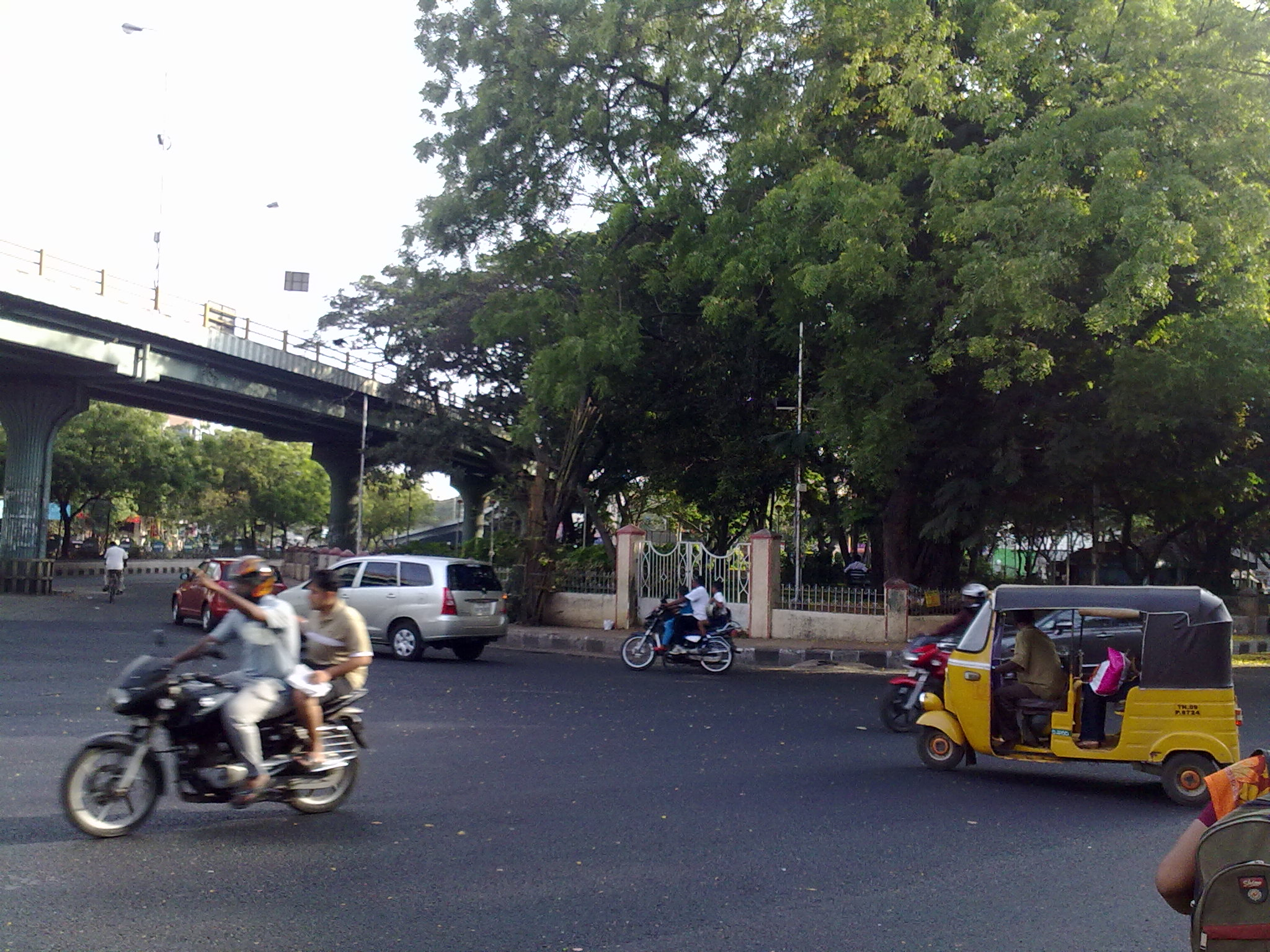
Intersection near Malar Hospital

- Elliot's beach in nearby Besant Nagar is the nearest point to the sea, and a popular recreation spot.

=== Educational and research institutions ===
Adyar is also home to Adyar Cancer Institute and Central Leather Research Institute, the world's largest leather research institute. Fortis Malar, one of the best speciality hospitals in Chennai, is also located in Adyar. IIT Madras, Anna University, National Institute of Fashion Technology, Kumar Rani Meena Muthiah Arts and Science College, Asian College of Journalism and the Technical Teachers Training Institute are all located in adjacent neighbourhoods. The Environmentalist Foundation of India is headquartered in the Besant Nagar neighborhood of Adyar. The lake/pond restoration efforts across the country are managed from this set up.

=== Schools ===
Schools in the neighbourhood include the oldest and a very big campus school in Adyar St. Patrick's Anglo Indian Higher Secondary School, which was started in 1875, St. Michael's Academy, Kendriya Vidyalaya, Bala Vidya Mandir, The Hindu Senior Secondary School, Bharath Senior Secondary School, Sri Sankara Senior Secondary School, Sishya, St Johns English School & Junior College, Maple Bear Canadian Preschool, and Indus Early Learning Centre, Vidya Ratna PTS Matric Higher Secondary School, The Chennai School (International Baccalaureate).

École Franco-Indienne Sishya is co-located with Sishya.

=== Localities ===
Sub-localities of Adyar include Gandhi Nagar, Kasturibai Nagar, Nehru Nagar, Indira Nagar, Venkatarathnam Nagar, Padmanabha Nagar, Bhaktavatsalam Nagar, Parameshwari Nagar, Jeevaratnam Nagar, Shastri Nagar, Karpagam Gardens, and Arunachalapuram.
