= Parameshwari Nagar =

Parameshwari Nagar is a small neighbourhood located in Adyar, Tamil Nadu, India. Parameshwari Nagar comprises four streets, namely Parameshwari Nagar 1st Street, Parameshwari Nagar 2nd Street, Parameshwari Nagar 3rd Street, and Parameshwari Nagar 4th street. It is located off LB Road and is primarily known to be a residential locality. It is very silent area with very few commercial establishments.

== Water ==
The quality of ground water in Parameshwari Nagar is very poor. The water is red in colour and requires a water purification unit to make it usable for homes. Several houses in Parameshwari Nagar use a carbon filter based purification unit to make the water clear. Local residents claim that the ground water problems arrived after the tsunami of December 2004. Commercially produced water is, however, available for most houses.

== Locality and security ==
A few pockets of Parameshwari Nagar are attached to a small slums, major part of Parameshwari Nagar has residential properties. Petty thefts are reported on and off by Residents at the nearby Police station, this makes the need for a security guard mandatory.

== Key advantages ==
Centrally located with all amenities within walking distance and peaceful environment.
