= École Franco-Indienne Sishya =

Location
- Sishya School in Adyar; India

École Franco-Indienne Sishya (EFIS) is a French international school co-located with the Sishya School in Adyar, Chennai, India.

It serves levels from primary school to the second-to-last year of lycée (senior high school). Elementary grades are directly taught while junior and senior high school/sixth-form grades are served by the National Centre for Distance Education (CNED) distance education programme.
