= National Public School, Chennai =

Location
- Chennai, Tamil Nadu; India; 13.050139°N 80.258171°E

Information
- Type: Private School
- Motto: Reach out, Reach high, Reach beyond and Knowledge is Power
- Established: 1970
- Principal: B Sujatha
- Enrollment: 1300
- Website: www.npschennai.com

National Public School (NPS), in Gopalapuram, Chennai, India, is run by the Citizens Education Society. It was founded in 1970 by KP Gopalkrishna and is run by National Education Trust. It is affiliated to the CBSE.

== The School ==
National Public School began as the National English School in a rented building on Avvai Shanmugam road in Gopalapuram. Now it is located in a sprawling campus on the same road. It was affiliated to the CBSE in 1972 and has 1300 students and 70 teachers. The school has an auditorium, play grounds, library, air-conditioned classrooms, science lab and a computer lab with over 40 laptops.

== Academics ==
The school has classes from KG-1 to 12. Each standard comprises three sections and each section has approximately 35 students. Students are given grades based on their scores in individual subjects.

Students can choose between Tamil, Hindi, Sanskrit and to study as Second Language and Third Language in classes 5 to 8. The school offers Science, Biology, Computer Science, Humanities and Commerce stream to students in classes 11 and 12.

== Fee structure ==
The school has a varying fee structure unlike other CBSE schools which follow a uniform fee for all students of a particular grade and it is revised YoY for all students. Instead they fix a fee for an academic year and every year there is a 7.5%-10% hike in fee. The fees is on the higher side. Because of this, a situation may arise where a student studying in grade 8 (enrolled in 1st grade 7 years back in the school) ends up paying less fee compared to a newly enrolled grade 2 student. Approximate fee for grade 3 for the academic year 2027-2028 is 2 Lakhs + Books and Uniform fees.

== Houses ==
Students are placed into four houses upon admission:

- Brilliance - Orange flag
- Eminence - Maroon flag
- Excellence - Light Blue flag
- Radiance - Purple flag

The houses are identified by the colour of the flag. The houses are awarded points based on their performance in extra-curricular activities - especially Running (track).

== Extra-curricular activities ==
Students have won awards in fields such as elocution, music (Carnatic, devotional and folk), dance and sports. The school has won the rolling trophy many times in the Students Book Fair.

The school has won prizes in Quizzes including ESPN Quiz and Young World Quiz.

NPS has a cultural event called Impressionz which is organised by the school students for other students in the city. It was started in 2000 as Blossom 2K and has attracted students from many schools of Chennai. In 2009 the event's name was changed to Impressionz by students.

The school encourages students to participate in sports activities. S. Shrikrishna of the school won the sub-junior Billiards Nationals titles in 2017.
