= St. Johns Educational Trust =

St John's educational trust is a registered Trust for educational and charitable purposes. Saint John's Educational Trust is funding and running seven educational institutions of which three are affiliated to the Central Board of Secondary Education, New Delhi and four are affiliated to the State Education Department, Government of Tamil Nadu.

== Institutions managed by St John's educational trust ==
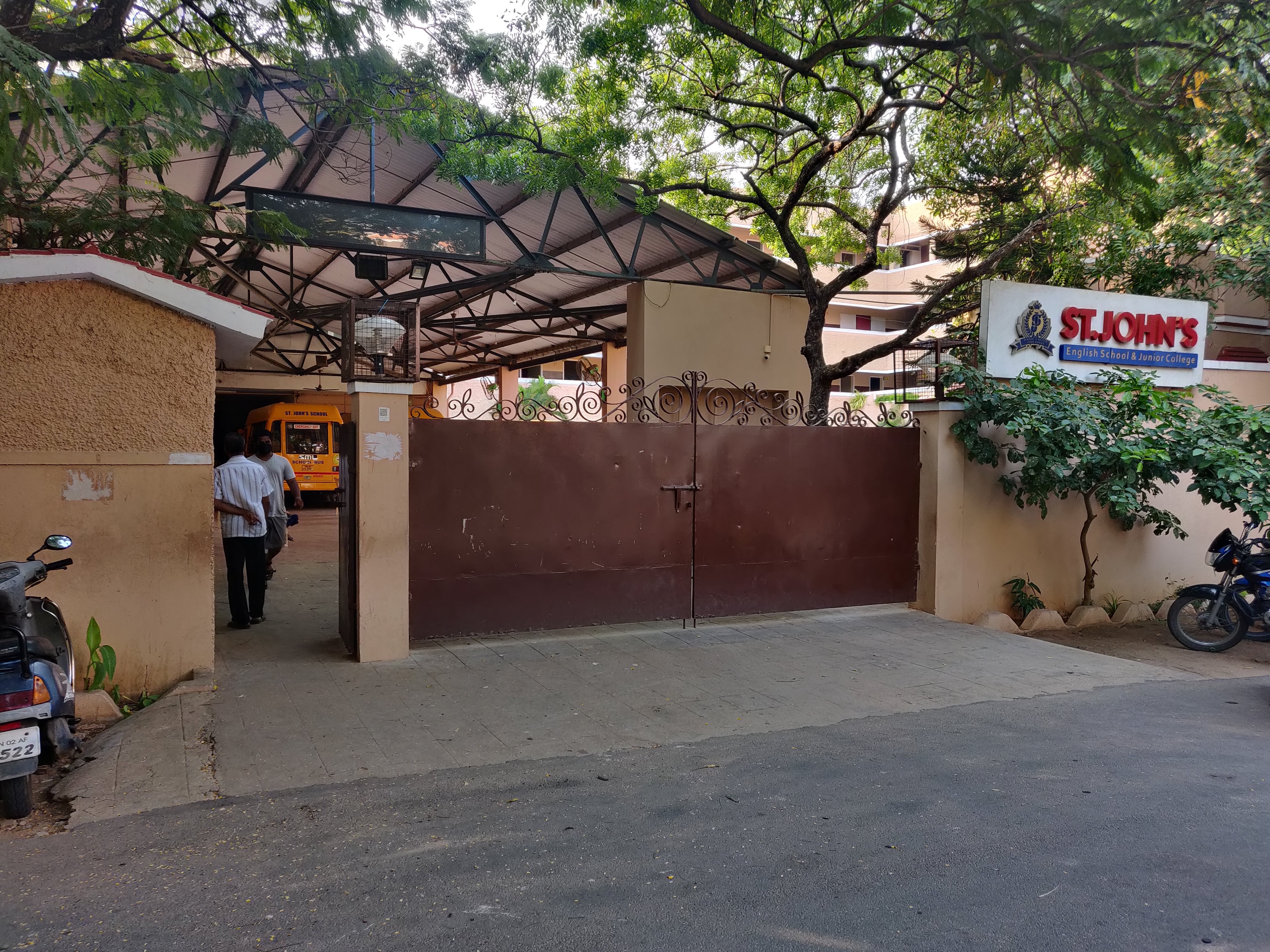
St. John's English School & Junior College

- St. John's Senior Secondary School, CBSE since 1968 Mandaveli, Chennai - 600 028
- St. John's Matriculation Higher Secondary School Alwarthirunagar, Chennai, since 1974 - 600087.
- St. John's English School & Junior College, CBSE since 1981 Besant Nagar, Chennai - 600 090
- St. John's Matriculation Higher Secondary School, since 1983 Baba Nagar, Chennai - 600 049
- St. John's International Residential School, CBSE since 1993 Poonamallee, Chennai - 602 103
- St. John's Matriculation Higher Secondary School, since 1997 Mandaveli, Chennai - 600 028
- St. John's Village School, since 2000 Poonamallee, Chennai - 602 103
- St. John's Academy Matriculation Higher Secondary School, since 2002 Poonamallee, Chennai - 602 103

=== St. John's Matriculation Higher Secondary School Alwarthirunagar ===
St. John's Matriculation Higher Secondary School, Alwarthirunagar
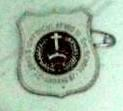

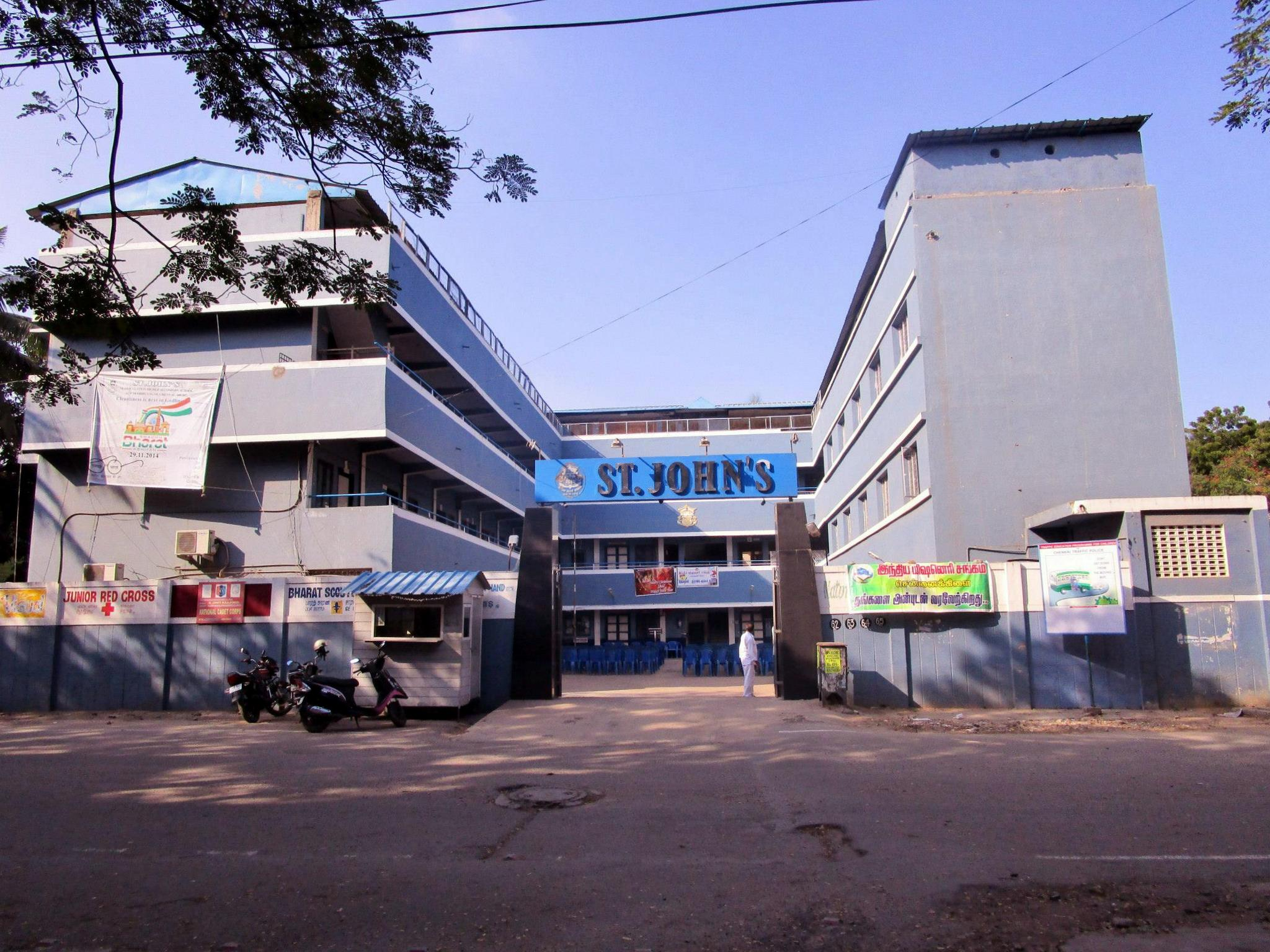
- School building in 2015.
- Chennai; India

Information
- Type: Co-educational, private
- Motto: Arise and Shine
- Established: 1974
- Trust: Saint John's Educational Trust (SJET)
- Principal: K.Santhosh Kumar
- Headmistress: Manoranjitham
- Grades: Kindergarten to Grade 12
- Average class size: 40
- Campus size: Medium
- Houses: Blue, green, red, yellow
- Medium of instruction: English
- Founder: D John Ponnnudurai
- Website: www.stjohnsatnagar.com

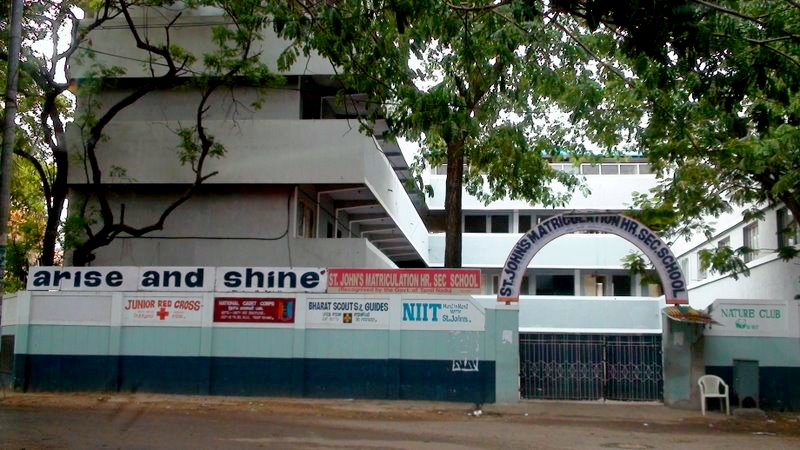
St. John's School

St John's Matriculation Higher Secondary School is a school in Alwarthirunagar which had its beginnings in the early 1980s. The school was founded by D John Ponnudurai. This school is part of the IYAP consortium. The school follows Matriculation Syllabus for students between Grade 1 to Grade 10 and Tamil Nadu State Board for grades Eleven and Twelve. It has branches in Porur, Triplicane and a sister school in the name of the Good Shepherd in Alwarthirunagar. The medium of education is English with Tamil, Hindi and French as second languages.

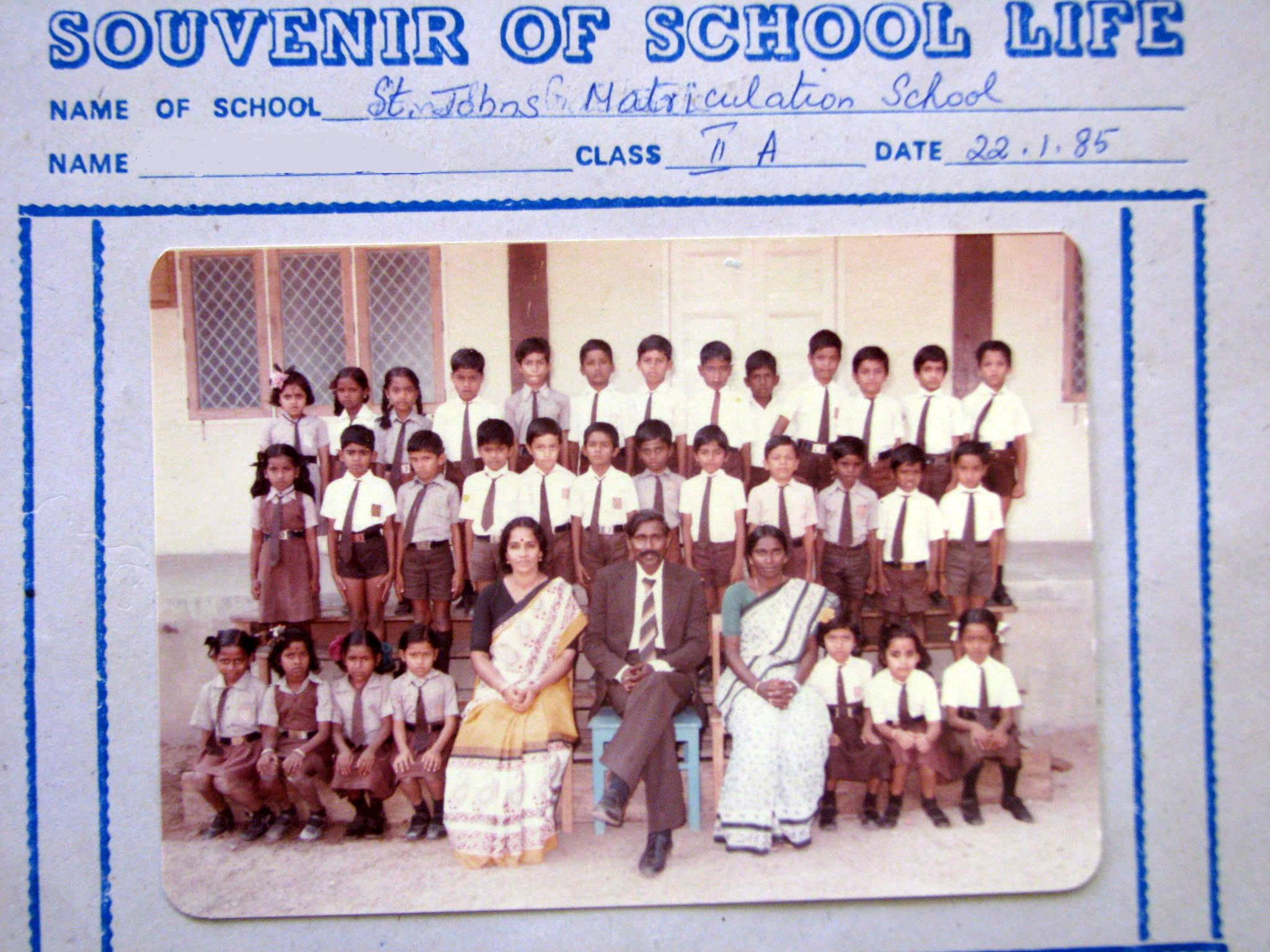
II std A Sec, 1984–85. The old uniforms can be seen.

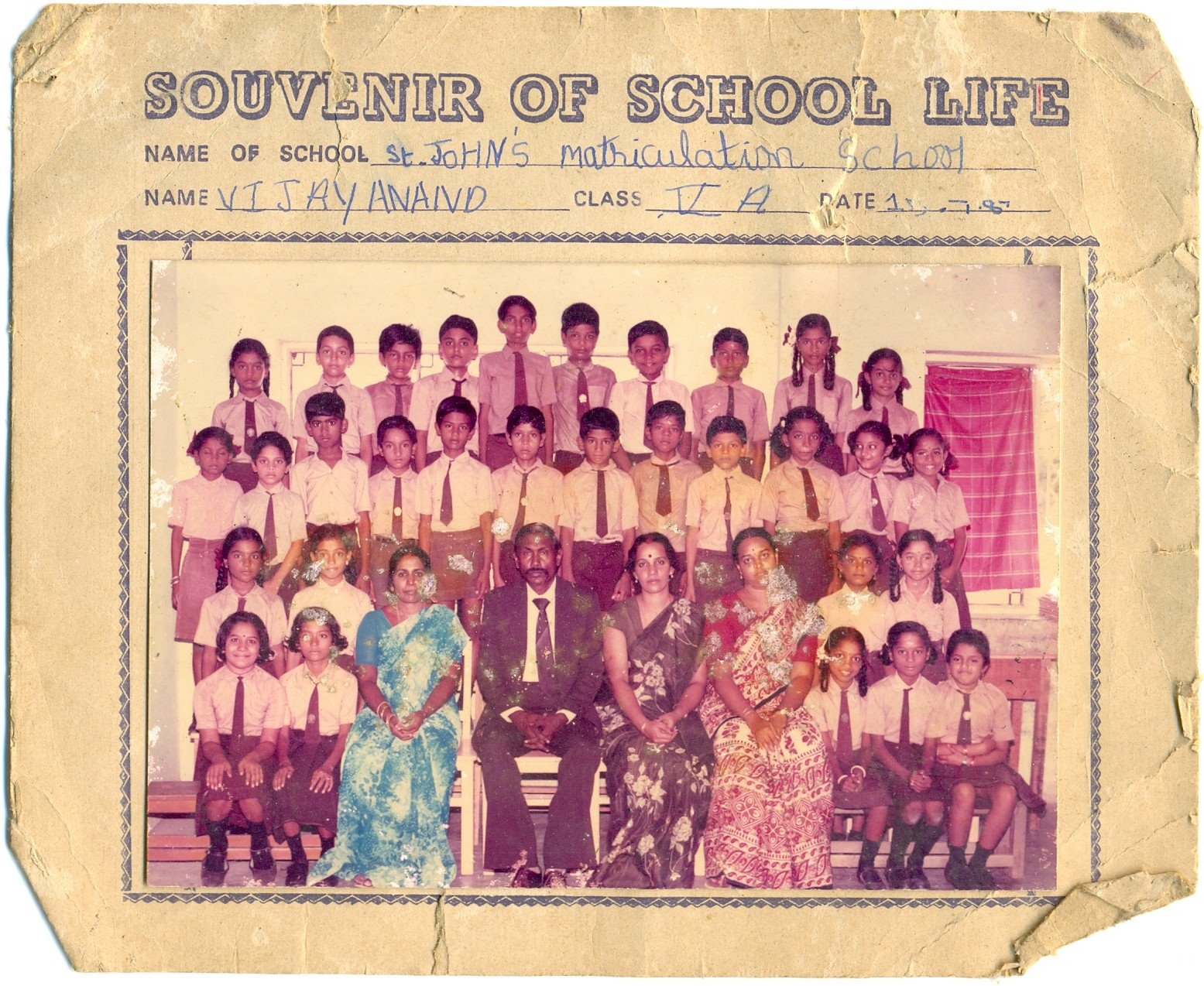

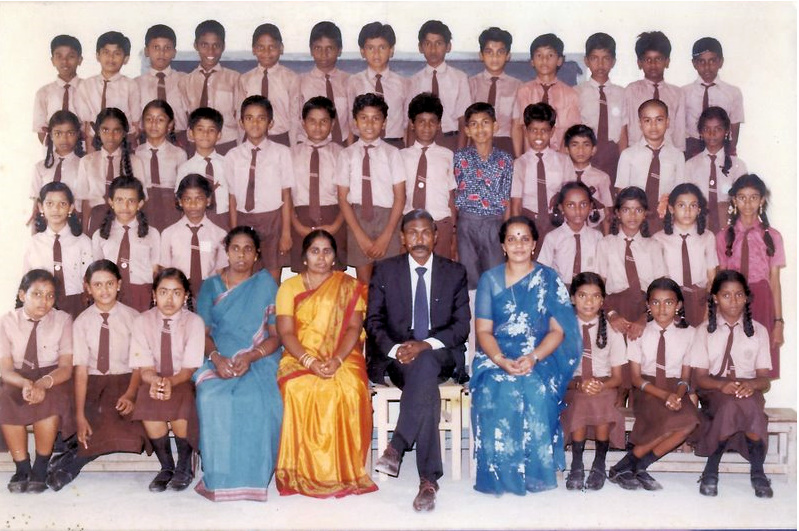
VII Std 1991-92. Maths Teacher.Maragadhavalli 1st from left

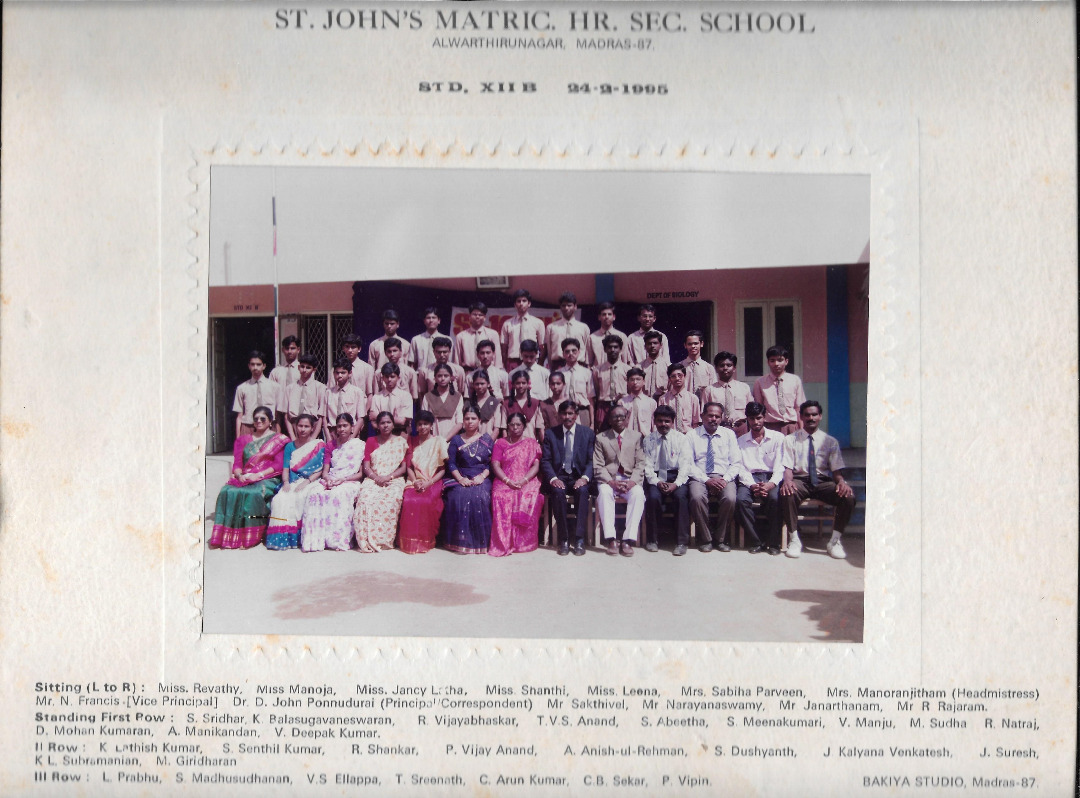
Class XII B 1995 Batch, with Names

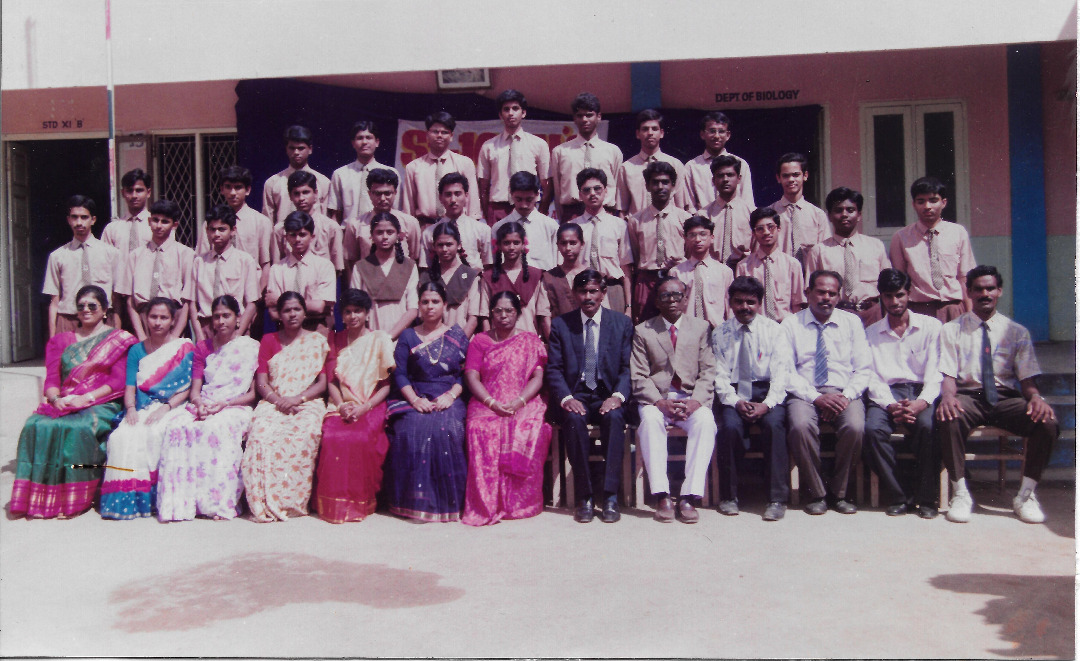
Class XII B 1995 Batch

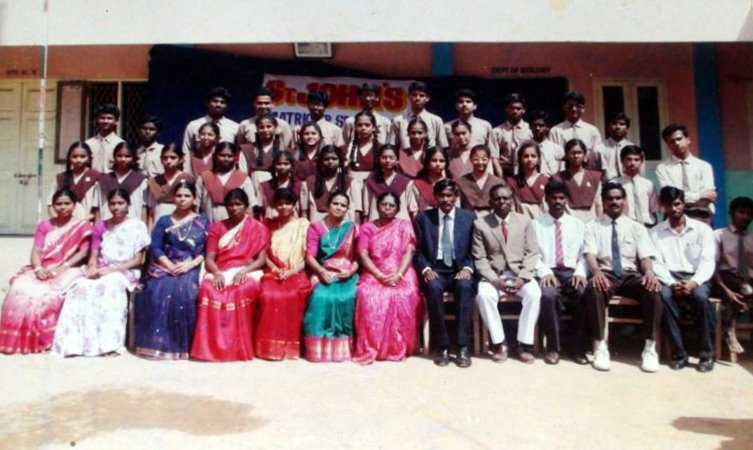
Class XII C 1995 Batch

==== Notable alumni ====
- Ekambaram, Tippu is a popular singer. 1995 batch
- Music Directors Srikanth Deva and Bobo Shashi at 'Shashi Kanth' who composed music for Kulir 100 Degrees.
- Actor Dhanush known as Venkatesh Prabhu by then (his real name) studied XI and XII from 1999–2001.
