= National Centre for Sustainable Coastal Management =

Indian research institute

- Emblem of India
- Established: 2011
- Focus: Coastal management
- Owner: Ministry of Environment, Forest and Climate Change (MoEF&CC), Govt. of India
- Location: Chennai, Tamil Nadu
- Website: ncscm.res.in//

The National Centre for Sustainable Coastal Management (NCSCM), Chennai is a research institute under the Ministry of Environment, Forest and Climate Change (MoEF&CC), Government of India with a vision to manage the Indian coast in a sustainable manner. The newly constructed building of NCSCM inaugurated by Honourable Minister Dr. Harsh Vardhan on 15 July 2017.
