= Siddha Central Research Institute =

Medical research center in Tamil Nadu, India

Siddha Central Research Institute (SCRI)
- Motto in English: Food is Medicine: Medicine is Food
- Asst. Director & In-Charge: Dr A.Kanagarajan
- Director General (CCRS): Prof.Dr. M.J Muthukumar
- Type: Autonomous research / public
- Established: 1971
- Academic affiliations: Central Council for Research in Siddha (CCRS); Ministry of AYUSH, Govt. of India
- Administrative staff: 25
- Location: Chennai, Tamil Nadu, India; 12.9391°N 80.1282°E
- Campus: Urban
- Website: crisiddha.tn.nic.in

Siddha Central Research Institute (SCRI) is a center for clinical research and methodology in Siddha medicine. This Institute is located in the campus of Arignar Anna Government Hospital of Indian Systems of medicine at Arumbakkam, Chennai, Tamil Nadu, India. It is functioning under the Central Council for Research in Siddha (CCRS).

== History ==
In 1979, centralized projects like literary research and documentation department, mobile Clinical research unit and drug research scheme (multidisciplinary) were also established along with Pharmacognosy and Phytochemistry. From 1999 the tribal projects functioning at Thirupathur and Kalasa were merged with Central Research Institute (Siddha) along with M.C.R.U., D.R.S. (MD), DSU(S) and L.R.&D.D. also was merged with Central Research Institute (Siddha) with effect from 1.4.2007. This Institute has the basic facilities for clinical research, drug research and literary research.

== Departments ==
1. Department of Clinical Research (DCR)
2. Department of Biochemistry
3. Department of Pathology
4. Department of pharmacognacy
5. Department of Chemistry
6. Department of pharmacology
7. Department of Pharmacy
8. Literary Research & Documentation Department and Library (LR&DD)

== Committees ==
1. Institutional Human Ethical Committee (IHEC)
2. Institutional Animal Ethical Committee (IAEC)
3. Scientific Advisory Board (SAB) of CCRS

== Clinical research and hospital services ==
SCRI is a presumed Siddha research institute. It is a referral hospital for Psoriasis.

Research includes:

- Clinical research
- Drug trials are conducted.

The institute is runs a general outpatient department (OPD) on all the days of the week. It has a subsidised 50 bed research hospital for in-patients (IPD). This IPD is a reputed center for treatment of psoriasis.

The government of India and the Dept of AYUSH are taking keen interest in promoting the health care of the old people through Indian systems of medicine.

=== Special OPDs ===
1. Neerizhivu (Diabetes) Special- on every Monday

2. Geriatric Health Care- on every Tuesday

3. Reproductive and Child Health care (RCH) – on every Saturday

A special Geriatric health care unit started functioning here since 13. 05. 2008. Siddha system of medicine has a specialized branch of study called Kayakalpam (Rejuvenation therapy) for geriatric health care. A Special OPD for Neerizhivu (Diabetes mellitus) since 14.11.2014

A unit of Varmam and traditional bone setting is functioning in the OPD of this hospital and better care is given for the patients suffering from dislocations, disc prolapse, cervical spondylosis and lumbar spondylosis. The Varmam OPD functioning on every day. OPD timing is 8 AM – 12 Noon.

== Department of Pharmacology ==
In the Department of Pharmacology

- Acute
- Sub-acute
- Chronic toxicity studies for Siddha drugs

== Publications ==
This institute has 230 publications in national and international peer reviewed journals.
