= Gopalapuram, Chennai =

Neighborhood in Chennai, India

Gopalapuram
- Neighborhood
- Location in Chennai Location in Tamil Nadu Location in India
- Coordinates: 13.05°N 80.2582°E
- Country: India
- State: Tamil Nadu
- District: Chennai
- Metro: Chennai

Population
  - Total: 35,359

Languages
  - Official: Tamil
- Time zone: UTC+5:30 (IST)
- PIN: 600086
- Vehicle registration: TN-06
- Lok Sabha constituency: Chennai Central
- Assembly constituency: Thousand Lights

Gopalapuram is a prime residential locality in Chennai, Tamil Nadu, India. It is surrounded by Royapettah in the North and East, Mylapore in the South-East, Teynampet in the South and Thousand Lights in the West. It is located 17 km (11 mi) from the Chennai International Airport and 3 km (1.9 mi) from Chennai Central railway station. It is located in between Dr. Radhakrishnan Salai and Anna Salai. Avvai Shanmugam Road passes through Gopalapuram, dividing it into North Gopalapuram and South Gopalapuram. Gopalapuram comes under Chennai Central Lok Sabha constituency.

== Educational institutions ==
Gopalapuram has many schools which are considered to be the best in Chennai. The educational institutions at Gopalapuram include:

- DAV Girls Senior Secondary School
- DAV Boys Senior Secondary School
- National Public School
- Sri Sarada Secondary School (Affiliated to the CBSE)
- Church Park Convent
- Gopalapuram Boys Higher Secondary School
- Ganapathy Girls Higher Secondary School

== Important places ==
- Sri Venugopalaswamy Temple
- Residence of the family of DMK leader and former chief minister of Tamil Nadu, Muthuvel Karunanidhi
- U.S. Consulate General
- Semmozhi Poonga (Literally translated to "Classical Language Park") is a botanical garden in Chennai set up by the horticulture department of the Government of Tamil Nadu. The garden was opened on 24 November 2010 by the then chief Minister Karunanidhi and is the first botanical garden in the city.
- Khadi Gramodyog Bhavan

== Colleges ==
- Stella Maris College
- M.O.P. Vaishnav College for Women

== Hospitals ==
- Dr. Agarwal's Eye Hospital
- Dr. Mohan’s Diabetes Specialities Centre

== Libraries ==
- Easwari Lending Library, oldest in the city of Chennai.

== Theaters ==
- SPI Cinemas, popularly known as "Satyam cinemas".

== Business ==
- Rane Group headquarters

== Gallery ==
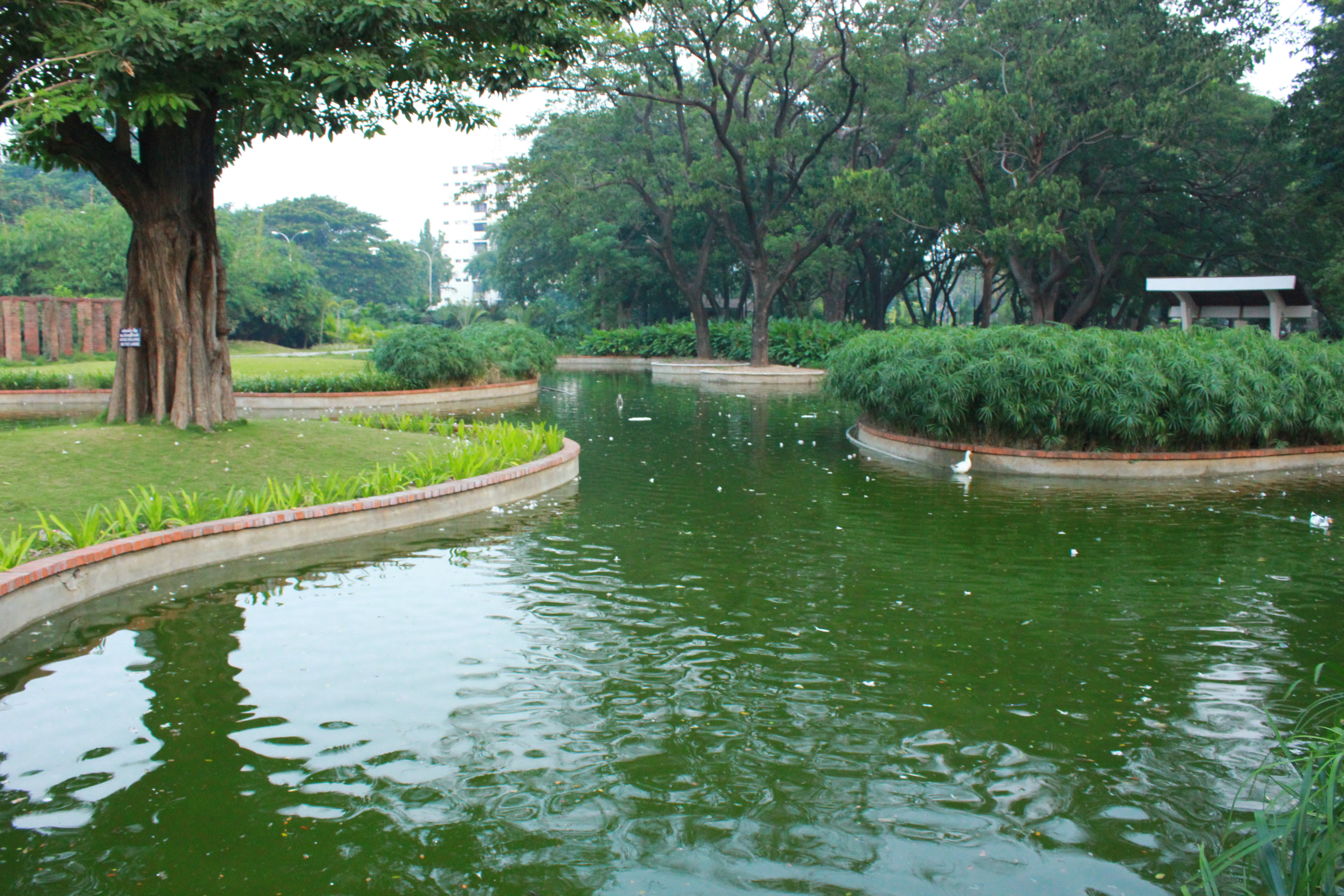
Artificial pond at the Semmozhi Park

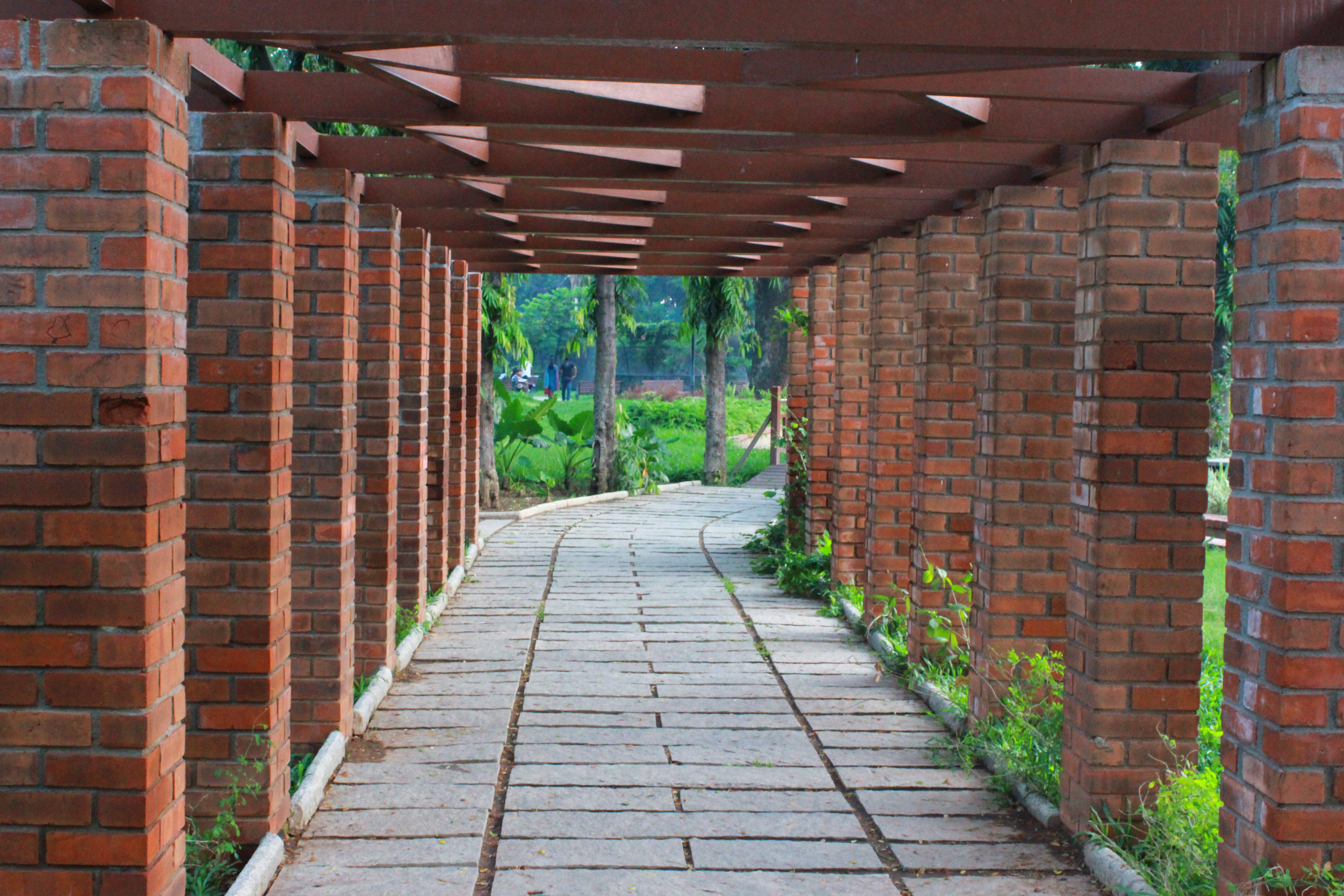
Walkway at Semmozhi park

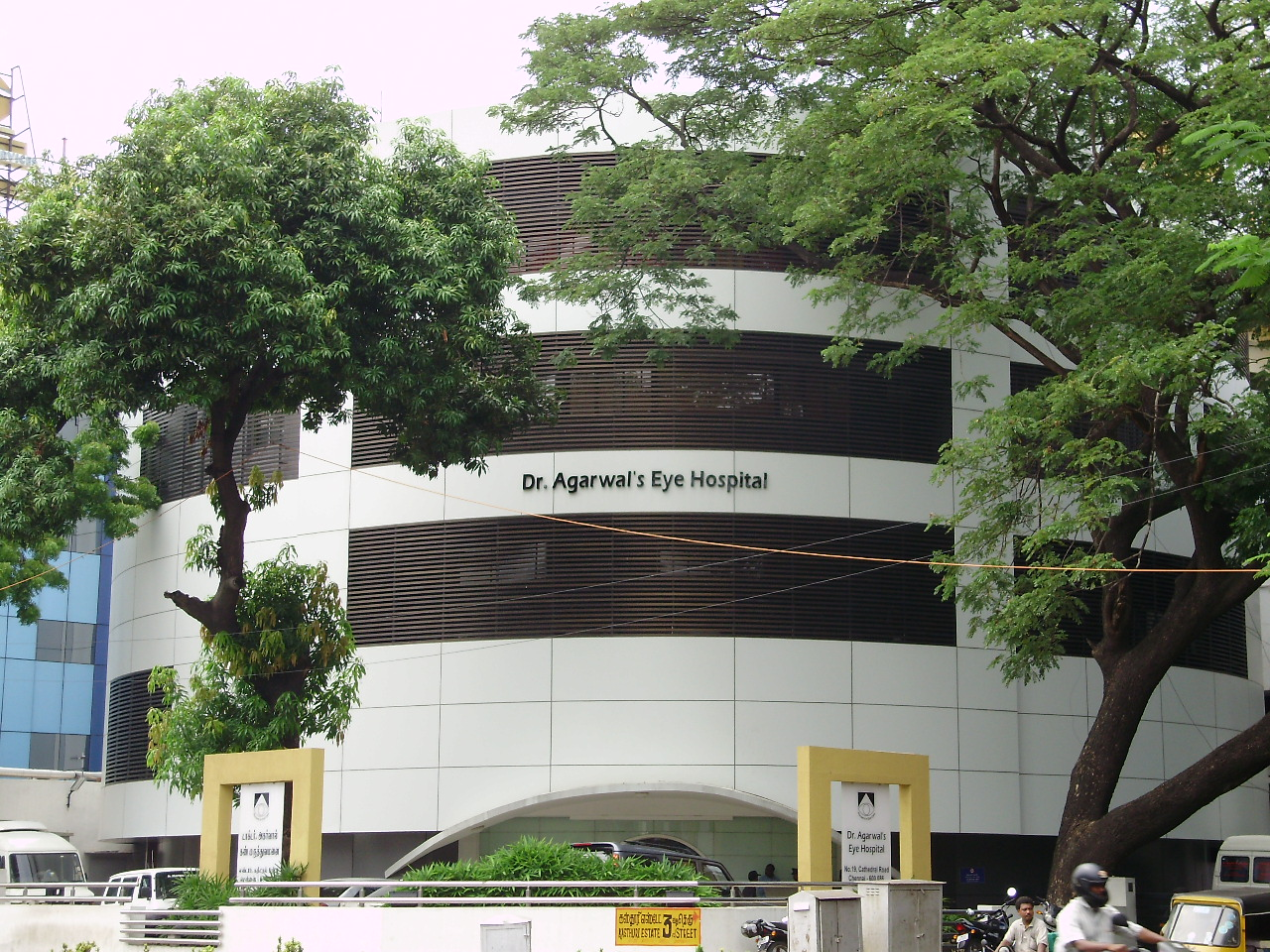
Dr. Agarwal Eye Hospital
