= D.A.V. Boys Senior Secondary School =

Boys' school in Gopalapuram, Chennai, India

Coordinates: 13.051077°N 80.256763°E

D.A.V. Boys Senior Secondary School, Gopalapuram, Chennai
- 212-213, Avvai Shanmugam Salai, Gopalapuram, Chennai, India

Information
- Type: Secondary school
- School board: Central Board of Secondary Education
- Authority: Tamilnadu Arya Samaj Educational Society
- Principal: Smt. Swarna Karpagavalli S
- Grades: KG to XII
- Gender: Boys
- Language: English medium
- Campus type: Urban
- Houses: Tagore, Shivaji, Pratap, and Bharati
- Publication: Deepika, Insight.
- Website: https://bgpm.davchennai.org

DAV Boys Senior Secondary School is a senior secondary high school located in Gopalapuram, a central part of Chennai, India. It is affiliated to the Central Board of Secondary Education. The school is noted for its high results in the CBSE Class 12 Board Exams and has been ranked among the best in the country over the years, especially in academics. In the past, the school has been ranked among the top three schools in India in the CBSE Class 12th Board Exam Results. The magazines Outlook and Education World rated the school as the best in Tamil Nadu.

Shri Ravi Malhotra is incumbent president of the board of management. The principal is Smt. Swarna Karpagavalli S who replaced Chitra Raghavan in 2024.

== Location ==
The school is located on Lloyds Road (Avvai Shanmugham Salai). It is flanked by sister institute D.A.V. Girls School. The boys school is attached with the corporation playground.

== Curriculum ==
D.A.V. Boys Gopalapuram follows the CBSE curriculum from 6th standard onwards. The average strength of a class is 40. Till class ten, the main subjects taught are Science, Social Science, Mathematics, English, and Language. Choices for Language are Tamil, Hindi and Sanskrit.

Computer Science, Third Language, Engineering Graphics, WoodWork, Art are compulsory for students till class 10.

Havans are performed by students every week.

== Houses ==
Shivaji, Bharati, Pratap, Tagore

== History ==
The school D.A.V. (Dayanand Anglo-Vedic schools system) was started by Arya Samaj with the motto of "Lead us from darkness unto light". Late Mr. Satyadev, Mr. Lalaindersain, Mr Malhotra D.C. along with late Mr Jaidev were the founder heads of the school.

Kulapathi. Dr. S. Balakrishna Joshi was the Founder - Principal; Sri A.S.Ram Kalia, late Shri Jaidev Ji and Shri Surendra Kumar led the school for more than two decades and were responsible for the schools growth.

== Rankings ==
The school has produced toppers in CBSE 10th and 12th standard exams as well as the AIEEE, BITSAT and IITJEE exams year after year.

Education World magazine ranked the school first in academic reputation (along with DPS Delhi) and over all fourth in the country in the year 2010.It has also been ranked as 8th in all over India schools

== Community service ==
Students participate in community service, particularly after the 2004 tsunami. The school has adopted villages where the NCC and the Boy Scouts help rehabilitate victims.

== Notable alumni ==
- Siddharth Narayan, Actor
- Kutraleeswaran - swimmer
- Bharat Bala - AR Rahman associate
