= Alwarthirunagar =

- Neighbourhood
- Alwarthirunagar(Chennai) Alwarthirunagar (Tamil Nadu) Alwarthirunagar (India)
- Coordinates: 13.047545°N 80.187293°E
- Country: India
- State: Tamil Nadu
- District: Chennai
- Metro: Chennai

Languages
  - Official: Tamil
- Time zone: UTC+5:30 (IST)
- PIN: 600 087
- Vehicle registration: TN 10 (RTO, Chennai South West)
- Lok Sabha constituency: Chennai South
- Vidhan Sabha constituency: Virugambakkam
- Website: alwarthirunagar.com

Alwarthirunagar is an urban locality in Chennai, the capital city of Tamil Nadu, India. Alwarthirunagar's PIN code is 600087 and the postal head office is in Valasaravakkam. It falls under Valasaravakkam municipality, in the Maduravoyal Assembly constituency, Tiruvallur district. The neighbourhood was developed by the City Lando Corporation in the late 1960s. With the opening of schools and shopping centres, Alwarthirunagar emerged as a service centre in West Chennai. Twenty acres of forestation in the area acts against pollution. The area is traversed by state road number 113.

== Neighbourhoods ==
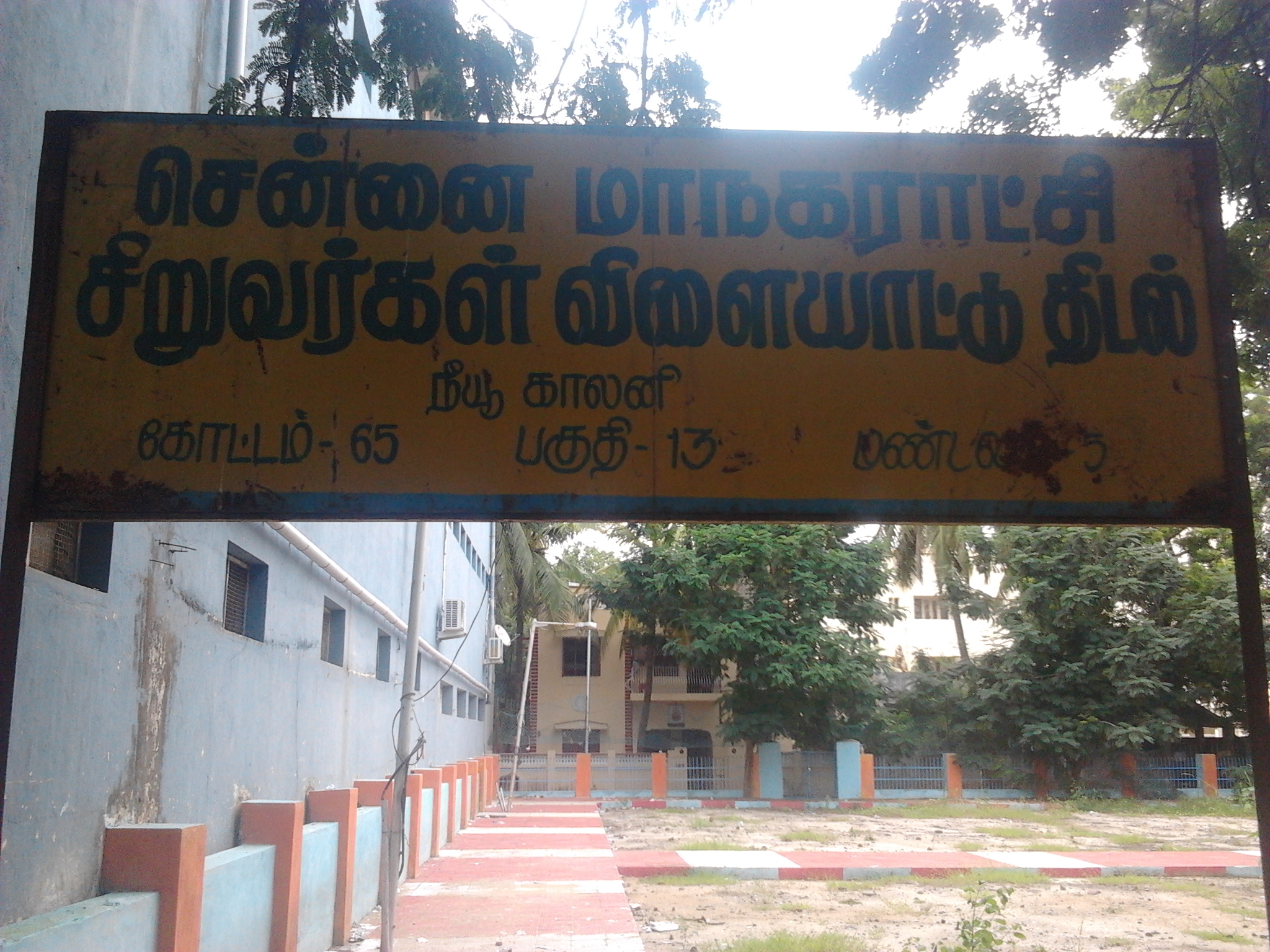
Chennai corporation students' play ground

=== Ramakrishna Nagar ===
Ramakrishna Nagar is located in the centre of Alwarthirunagar. A large recreation area developed in the 1980s is used for playing cricket. However, in 2008, new constructions encroached on the area and flooding is a common problem during the rainy season.

=== Velan Nagar ===
Velan Nagar is approximately 1 km from the Alwarthirunagar bus stop and about 800 m from the Lamech bus stop. During the late 1980s, Velan Nagar was affected by stagnating water during the rainy season. By the 1990s, the area had developed into a very large residential area, decreasing the number of parks and making cycling more difficult. There is a Banyan tree that is considered holy. The Ganesh temple in Velan Nagar has been renovated.

=== Palaniappa Nagar ===
Palaniappa Nagar is adjacent to Alwarthirunagar with streets connecting from Arcot Road and Radhakrishnan Salai.

=== Meenakshi Amman Nagar ===
Meenakshi Amman Temple, Raamar Temple, Kadambadi Amman Temple, Pillayar Kovil are close to Meenakshi Amman Nagar.

== Central business district ==
The main commercial district is on Arcot road. There is a multi-brand superstore, grocery stores, fast food outlets, a bakery and a library. There is also a Panchayat Union dispensary.

== Schools ==
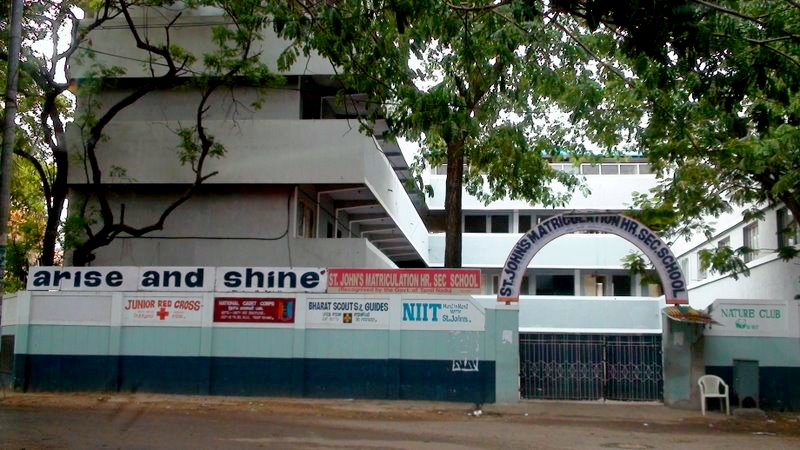
St. John's School

- La Chatelaine Junior College
- St. John's Matriculation Higher Secondary School
- Sri Venkateswara Matriculation Higher Secondary School
- Lamech School
