= Government Madrasa-i-Azam Higher Secondary School =

Location
- Anna Salai (Mount Road), Chennai, Tamil Nadu – 600002; India; 13.0730°N 80.2640°E

Information
- Type: Public
- Authority: Government of Tamil Nadu
- Grades: 6–12

Government Madrasa-i-Azam Higher Secondary School (Tamil: அரசு மதரசா-இ-ஆசம் மேல்நிலைப் பள்ளி) is a public secondary educational institution located on Anna Salai (Mount Road) in Chennai, Tamil Nadu, India. It is a government-run school providing secondary and higher secondary education.

The institution traces its origins to 1761.

== Academic profile ==
- Curriculum: Tamil Nadu State Board of School Examination
- Levels: Secondary and higher secondary education (Grades 6–12)
- Medium of instruction: English
- Admissions: Education is provided without tuition fees

== Administration ==
The school is administered by the Government of Tamil Nadu.
