= Indira Nagar, Chennai =

Indira Nagar
- neighbourhood
- Location within Chennai Location within Tamil Nadu Location within India
- Coordinates: 12.995107°N 80.249590°E
- Country: India
- State: Tamil Nadu
- District: Chennai District
- Metro: Chennai

Government
  - Body: Chennai Corporation

Languages
  - Official: Tamil
- Time zone: UTC+5:30 (IST)
- Planning agency: CMDA
- Civic agency: Chennai Corporation
- Website: www.chennai.tn.nic.in

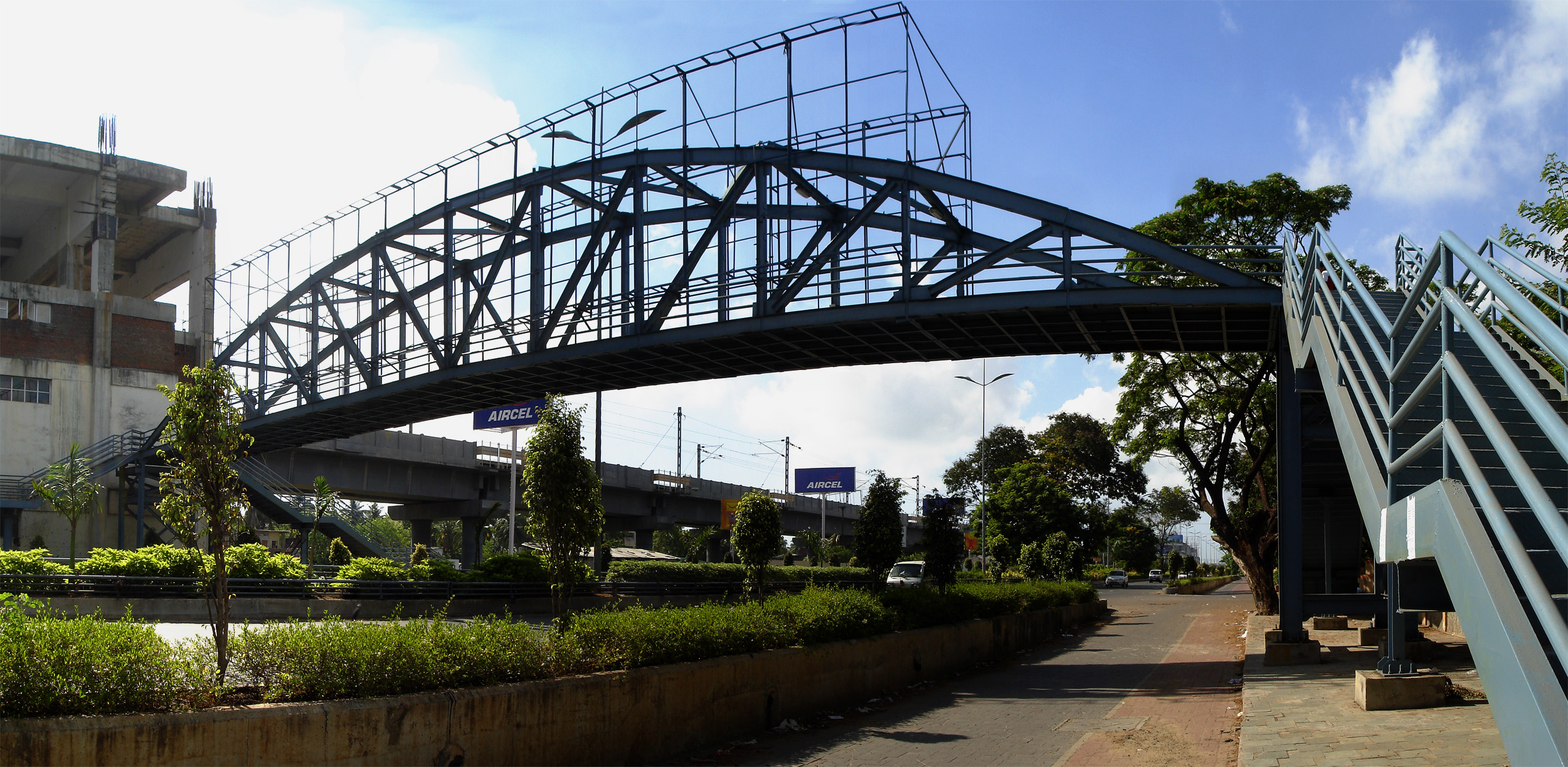
Rajiv Gandhi Salai in Indira Nagar

Indira Nagar (Tamil: இந்திரா நகர்) is a neighbourhood in Chennai, India.

The region was developed by the Tamil Nadu Housing Board (TNHB) in the late 1970s and early 1980s. It contains residential plots, apartments, commercial complexes, large arterial roads, school zones, bus terminals, and slums.

Indira Nagar is an example of a government-planned town established by the TNHB. In comparison to other TNHB developments such as Anna Nagar, K.K. Nagar, Ashok Nagar, and Besant Nagar, Indira Nagar is relatively small-scale. The Indira Nagar station, part of the Chennai Mass Rapid Transit System, serves the neighbourhood. Hindu Senior Secondary School is located in the area.
