= Directorate of Matriculation Schools, Tamil Nadu =

The Directorate of Matriculation Schools, Tamil Nadu is an accreditation and governing body for secondary schools in Tamil Nadu, India. In a concept unique to Tamil Nadu (within India), until 1971 Universities also governed secondary schools, and such schools were accredited to the Matriculation system. About 5% of schools in Tamil Nadu fall under this system.

Schools use English as the language of instruction. They have a unique curriculum until class 10 and follow the Tamil Nadu State Board curriculum for classes 11 and 12. Schools are accredited on an annual basis. Apart from that, languages like Hindi, French, Sanskrit are taught as optional. other than academics, Arts & crafts, physical activities and projects are also conducted in matriculation schools.

For the academic year 2008-09, 2.31 million students were enrolled in the matriculation schools with a boy to girl ratio of 10:9. From 2001 to 2008, the pass percentage has been 90 and above excepting for 2002 when it dipped to 87.
