= Sishya School =

Location
- 2, 2nd St, Padmanabha Nagar, Chennai; India; 13.005188°N 80.258938°E

Information
- Type: Education institution
- Motto: Aspire & Excel
- Established: 1972
- Founder: K.I. Thomas
- Principal: Omana Thomas
- Enrollment: 1200
- Affiliation: ICSE
- Website: www.sishya.com

Sishya is an Indian Certificate of Secondary Education (ICSE) syllabus Indian school, based in Chennai, Tamil Nadu. Founded in 1972 by Mr K.I. Thomas. It used to be affiliated and shared its premises with the now defunct École Franco-Indienne Sishya.

== History ==
After his retirement from Lawrence School, Lovedale, K.I. Thomas began a nursery-cum-preparatory school, in January 1972, with a first batch of 28 pupils. In 1974, the Council for the Indian School Certificate Examinations, granted the school affiliation, thereby enabling it to present its first batch of students for the ICSE examination the following year. In 1986, the second part of the ICSE exams were added, allowing the school to teach 11th and 12th grades.

Two years after the school was initiated, the colleagues of K.I. Thomas founded the KIT Thomas Educational Society, a registered Christian Minority Trust.The Trust now owns and controls the management of the school. The very next year, 1975, the school was shifted to five-acre premises in Ramalayam Annexe, near the Ramalayam Palace of the Travancore Family.

1984 saw the addition of a new block to house the senior school and laboratories. In 1985, the Sishya Parent-Teacher Association was established, and by 1989 had raised enough money for the creation of another block, and an auditorium. In 1991, preschool, and kindergarten classes were started, through donations from ITC.

In 1994, land from the lake on the premises was reclaimed, to create a playground. In 1997, a library block was added. In 2006, the auditorium and surrounding blocks were renovated, to keep up with the increase in capacity of the school.

2010 saw the creation of a new branch, in association with the C.L. Metha Trust, the Dr. C.L. Metha Sishya OMR School (now renamed as Sishya OMR School) on the Old Mahabalipuram Road. In 2011 the École Franco-Indienne Sishya was opened in the main school campus.It was closed later in 2017 due to lack of staff and students attending.

== Events and activities ==
Sishyamrita is the annual, Inter-School Cultural event, hosted by the school. It takes place over two days, and students from other schools are invited to participate in a variety of events, in the fields of Dance, Music, Art, and Creative Writing.

SishMUN is the school's annual Model United Nations conference hosted by the school. Over 900 delegates from schools all over the country, and even abroad take part in the 3-day event, organized, and hosted by the students.

Sishya Fête is an annual fundraising event at the school grounds. Multiple stalls, events, sideshows and games are on offer, including a large raffle draw with a multitude of prizes.

The Interact club of Sishya, associated with Rotary International, was started in order to motivate its students to engage in charitable work. It consists of students from the senior school who conduct various fundraising events, the proceeds from which go towards the supplying less fortunate with essential goods.

== Alumni ==
Sishya's alumni include singer Tanvi Shah, racer Karun Chandhok, actors Arvind Swamy and Dulquer Salmaan, television presenter / sports commentator and actor Suhail Chandhok, author Samhita Arni, peace and gender-equality activist Kirthi Jayakumar, actor Shanthanu Bhagyaraj, actor Saranya Bhagyaraj, Joint Managing Director of Sundaram-Clayton Lakshmi Venu.
