= Directorate of Government Examinations =

Indian government agency

Directorate of government examinations
- Native name: அரசு தேர்வுகள் இயக்குனரகம்
- Type: Governmental Board of School Education
- Founded: 1911
- Headquarters: Chennai, Tamil Nadu, India
- Area served: Tamil Nadu, India
- Key people: Anbil Mahesh Poyyamozhi, Minister for school education S. Sethuramavarma, Director of Government Examinations
- Services: Education, School Examination & Issue Certificates
- Website: dge.tn.gov.in

The Directorate of Government Examinations was formed as a separate directorate in India in February 1975. Prior to the formation of Directorate Of Government Examinations, the then DPI/DSE was the ex-officio commissioner for Government exams and the department was having its office at Madras only. The first secondary school leaving certificate exam was conducted in the year 1911. This directorate started conducting the following major exams from the year noted against each of them in addition to the various examination.

== History ==
Name of Examination Year commenced

Matriculation-1979 AngloIndian-1979 Hr. Secondary - 1980 Introduction of Uniform Pattern (SSLC) - 2012

This Directorate has 7 Regional offices at Madurai, Coimbatore, Tiruchirappalli, Tirunelveli, Chennai, Cuddalore and Vellore. Apart from the academic stream examination in academic fields, this department is conducting various vocational stream examinations also as given in the Annexure. At present this department in conducting exams for about 25 lakh students every year, To enable the drop out who could not pursue their school studies due to various reasons, this department is conducting 8th standard public exam purely for private candidates. Likewise, private candidates are also permitted to appear for SSLC and Hr. Sec. School Exams directly either wholly or compartmentally.

== Important Milestones of Directorate of Government Examinations ==
=== 20th Century ===
1911 Introduction of SSLC Examinations

1972 Computerised Mark Certificates issued from

1975 Formation of Directorate of Government Examinations

1978 Introduction of Matriculation and Anglo-Indian Examinations

1980 Introduction of Higher Secondary Examination

1980 Formation of Regional Deputy Directorate of Government Examinations – Madurai Region.

1980 Formation of Regional Deputy Directorate of Government Examinations – Coimbatore Region.

1982 Formation of Regional Deputy Directorate of Government Examinations – Trichy Region.

1984 Formation of Regional Deputy Directorate of Government Examinations – Chennai Region.

1987 Formation of Regional Deputy Directorate of Government Examinations – Tirunelveli Region.

1989 Implementation of Improvement scheme in Higher Secondary Examination – allowing passed candidates to re-appear again for improving their marks.

1994 Formation of Regional Deputy Directorate of Government Examinations – Cuddalore Region.

1996 Introduction of Aural / Oral skill test in Paper II of languages Part I & II in Higher Secondary Examination.

1999 Formation of Regional Deputy Directorate of Government Examinations – Vellore Region.

=== 21st Century ===
2000 Affixing Hologram stickers in the Mark Certificates

2000 Printing of Bi-lingual Mark Certificates in Tamil & English languages.

2000 Use of OMR sheets for answering 75 one mark questions in Higher Secondary Computer Science subject was introduced.

2001 System of issuing photocopy of Answer scripts and Revaluation of Answer Scripts for four subjects such as Maths, Physics, Chemistry and Biology was introduced.

2001 Minimum pass Marks fixed for theory and practical Examinations for Higher Secondary (30/50 marks for Practical, 40/150 marks for Theory)

2002 Introduction of special supplementary examination (Instant exam) in June / July for those who failed in one or two subjects in Higher Secondary Examination.

2003 Introduction of Special Admission Sheme (Tatkal scheme) for receiving application from Private candidates who failed / missed to apply in due date.

2003 Issue of Mark Certificate with in-built security features.

2003 Eligibility for applying the special supplementary examination conducted in June / July is extended up to three failed subjects.

2003 System of issuing Photocopy of Answer scripts and Revaluation of Answer scripts is extended for Botany and Zoology subjects in Higher Secondary Examination (6 subjects).

2003 Affixing School seal at the back side of the Certificate.

2005 Abolition of Improvement Examination system in Higher Secondary Examination.

2007 Revision of minimum pass marks for theory and practical examinations in Higher Secondary Examination (Theory-30/150; Practical – 40/50).

2007 System of issuing Photocopy of Answer scripts and Revaluation of Answer scripts is extended for Computer science subject in Higher Secondary Examination (7 subjects).

2008 Scheme of allotting 10 minutes to read the question papers during 10th & 12th Public examination was implemented.

2009 System of issuing Photocopy of answer scripts and Revaluation of answer scripts was extended for all subjects in Higher Secondary Examinations.

2012 Issue of mark certificate with the candidate's photo and Barcode was implemented.

2013 Online registration of Private candidates’ applications and online registration of applications seeking Retotalling / Revaluation / Photocopy of answer scripts was introduced.

2013 Examination fee exemption for Blind candidates was extended to Private candidates also.

2013 Pages in Main Answer booklet for Higher Secondary Examination is increased from 16 to 40 pages and for SSLC is increased from 8 to 32 pages.

2013 A new scheme which involves attaching Top sheets along with the Main answer booklet containing all details of the candidate along with barcode is introduced.

2013 Online hosting of scan copies of Answer scripts of Higher Secondary Examination was introduced instead of issue of Photocopies of Answer scripts.

2014 Educational District wise Government Examinations Service Centres (Nodal Centres) for online registration of private candidates’ application was set up.

2015 New scheme of issuing provisional Mark Certificates (Temporary mark sheets) was introduced.

2016 Permanent Register Number was given to all pupil candidates who appeared for 10th / 12th Public examinations for the first time. Also Permanent Register Number was given to all Direct Private candidates (HP Type) who appear for the examination for the first time. This Permanent Register Number will be useful to the candidates for writing the examinations under compartmental system in future.

2016 System of issuing of Consolidated Mark Certificate for candidates who have first appeared and failed to pass in all the subjects was introduced from March / April 2016 Higher Secondary / SSLC Examination 2016 onwards.

2017 Cancellation of ranking system for SSLC and Hsc. introduction of public exam for 11th grade. Change of marks weightage of 1200 by dividing into two, one for 11th and another 12th so that 11th grade is for 600 and 12th for 600. changes in marksheet by adding both 11th and 12th. marks reduction of exam hours from three and half to 2 and half hours.

2019 Introduction of public examination for classes 5th and 8th. Exam time was increased to 3 hours.

2020 Cancellation of board examination for classes 5th and 8th
