= Reasons for Not Eating Animal Food =

1814 pamphlet written by Sir Richard Phillips

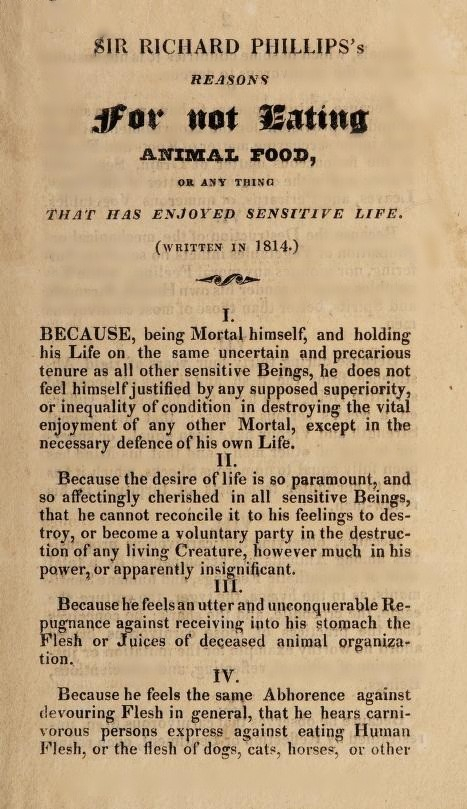
- First page
- Author: Richard Phillips
- Language: English
- Genre: Vegetarianism
- Publisher: Clifford
- Publication date: 1814
- Publication place: England
- Media type: Print (pamphlet)
- Pages: 4
- OCLC: 502224329
- Text: Reasons for Not Eating Animal Food at Wikisource

Reasons for Not Eating Animal Food is an 1814 pamphlet on vegetable diet, which was written by Sir Richard Phillips. It was originally written in 1811, and published multiple times by the author.

== Background ==
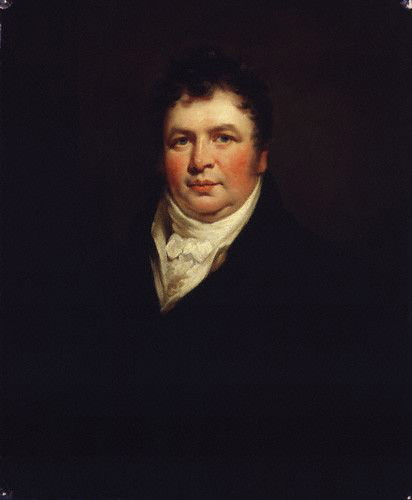
1806 portrait of Sir Richard Phillips by James Saxon

Sir Richard Phillips was an English teacher, author, publisher, Sheriff of London, and a vegetarianism activist. At the age of twelve, he accidentally witnessed the barbarities of a London slaughterhouse, and while attending the Chiswick School he saw a fish being cut open, which contained the remains of smaller fish in the intestine. It was then brought to the table and served to eat. His appetite was "revolted at the idea of eating part of a creature so lately and so palpably enjoying itself in its own element," so he excused himself from the table, and in that moment, he chose he would maintain a rigid abstinence from meat eating. He often referred to it as the vegetable diet, or the Pythagorean diet.

As a publisher, Phillips first published English antiquarian Joseph Ritson's 1802 vegetarian activism work, An Essay on Abstinence from Animal Food, as a Moral Duty. Author and activist Charles Walter Forward writes that throughout Phillips lifetime, he "undoubtedly did much to spread a knowledge of Vegetarian principles." His notorious abstinence led a writer of the Quarterly Review to jest, while in reference to Phillips' "Reasons [...]," that although he would not eat meat, he was addicted to "gravy over his potatoes." As an author, he wrote the 1811 work On the Powers and Duties of Juries, the 1817 work A Morning's Walk from London to Kew, and the 1828 work A Personal Tour Through the United Kingdom, among others.

=== Early publications ===
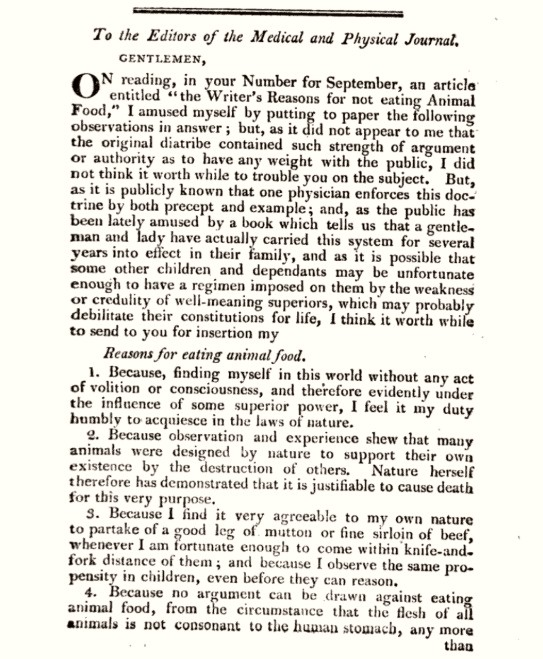
Opening for Reasons for eating Animal Food

Phillips' list of 16 reasons for a vegetable diet first appeared in his own publication, Monthly Magazine, on July 27, 1811. This list was then submitted to the Medical and Physical Journal, which printed it in the October 26, 1811 edition, entitled "The Writer's Reasons for not Eating Animal Food." It included a note explaining the events that had led him to abstain from eating meat, comparing his own experience to that Benjamin Franklin's, after ending meat consumption when being faced with eating fish. The list was signed under the pen name "Common Sense." Its publication was noted in Fifty Years of Food Reform: A History of the Vegetarian Movement in England, and was described as arising from "the faith that was in him with regard to humanitarian dietetics."

It was referred to in September of that year in the Medical and Physical Journal, with an adverse response by a writer under the pseudonym Φúσεως 'Aиóλoudoς. The writer listed their own 16 "Reasons for eating Animal Food." Among their reasons were culinary purposes, that animals were created for consumption in accordance with parts of the Holy Bible, and "that a carnivorous animal is no more sensible that he is committing an act of cruelty while he is devouring another, than a sheep is in eating turnips."

== Publication ==
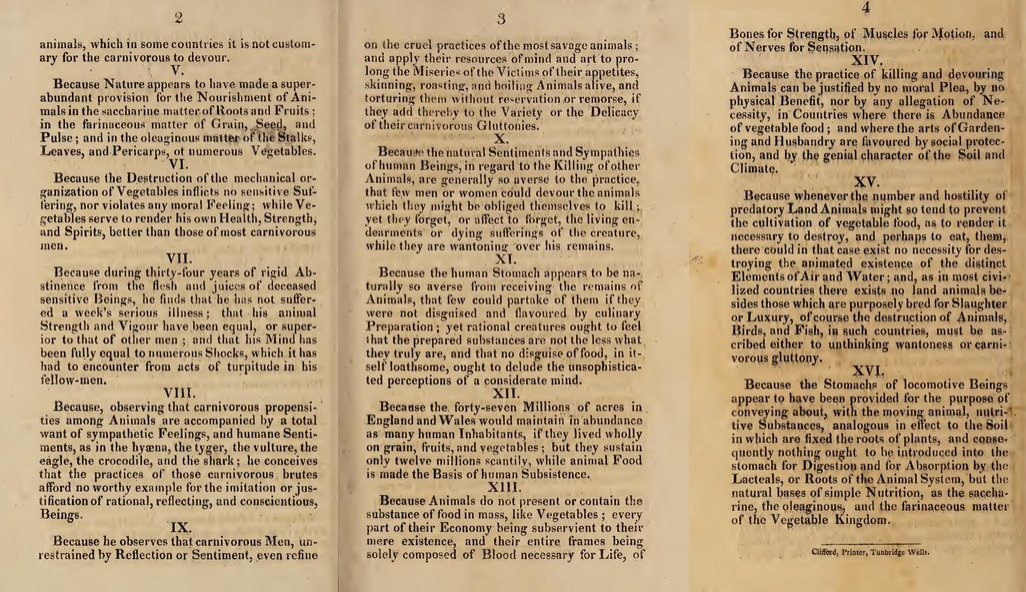
Pages two, three and four

At 10 x 17 centimeters, Reasons for not eating animal food, or any thing which has enjoyed sensitive life is four pages in total length. It was first published as its own pamphlet by Phillips in 1814. The British Book Trade Index lists John Clifford of Tunbridge Wells as the printer, a trade he had between 1809 and 1843. It was also published in the city of Manchester. It is noted by English writer and preacher Joseph Nightingale with Phillips' work, that "this benevolent species of abstinence has numerous observers."

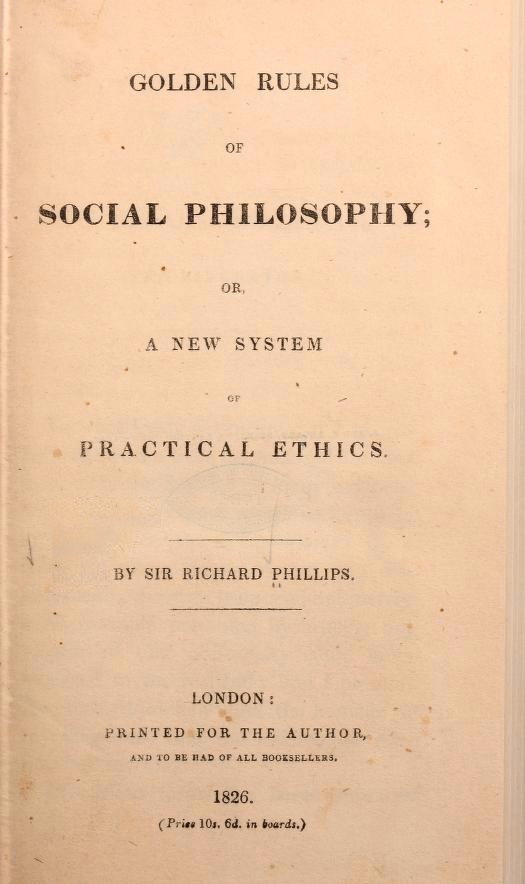
Title page for Golden Rules for Social Philosophy

The work was published many times by Phillips. Reasons for not eating animal food would later appear in Phillips' 1826 work Golden Rules for Social Philosophy; or a new system of practical ethics. It listed an additional six reasons in this publication, printed at the end of the work, and was entitled "The Author's Reasons for not Eating Animal Food." The original 16 reasons were printed by English author and vegetarian Howard Williams for inclusion in his 1886 work The Ethics of Diet: A Catena of Authorities Deprecatory of the Practice of Flesh-eating. To make it more suitable for his humanitarian readers, the colonialist points were removed, which the online vegan service HappyCow claims as an "early example of 'political correctness'."

Phillips' reason number twelve, that the "forty-seven Millions of acres in England and Wales would maintain in abundance as many human Inhabitants, if they lived wholly on grain, fruits, and vegetables; but they sustain only twelve millions scantily, while animal Food is made the Basis of human Subsistence," was similarly echoed by him in an issue of the Vegetarian Messenger, which led W. W. Ireland to write that he was "impressed by the argument," in that "vegetable food is cheaper and less wasteful of the resources of the country than animal food."

=== Content ===
Among Phillips' reasons are that in being mortal "he does not feel himself justified by any supposed superiority," and that the "desire of life is so paramount [...] that he cannot reconcile it to his feelings to destroy." He then lists the "utter and unreconquerable repugnance against receiving into his stomach the flesh or juices of deceased animal," citing that he feels the same abhorence against devouring flesh as he hears "carnivorous persons express against eating Human Flesh." Phillips writes that nature has made a "superabundant provision [...] of numerous Vegetables [...] which serve to render his own Health, Strength, and Spirits." He notes that during the 34 years of his vegetable diet, he has not suffered one week of serious illness.

=== In Golden Rules of Social Philosophy ===
Six additional reasons by Phillips appear in his 1826 work, Golden Rules for Social Philosophy; or a new system of practical ethics. There are also several modifications, or elaborations, made to the original reasons.

Phillips orders a gradation of existence, by which "atoms form the granular and crystallized masses of inert matter, these forming vegetation, and vegetables forming animalization." He also lists moral and mental convictions, which defy "health and vigour" that have been learned out of the "intellectual darkness and unfeeling assumptions of the medical and philosophical schools," adding that one must "respect his own moral sentiments, and leave to powers above his own, the balancing of nature, and the harmonizing of existence." Finally, he mentions our savage ancestry, focusing on tribes within the British colonies who practice cannibalism, and on hunting, shooting, fowling, fishing, calling these practices of mankind "merciless tyran[ny] of the whole animated creation."

== Reviews ==
Howard Williams says of Phillips' Reasons for not eating animal food that his "unalterable faith in the truth of humanitarian dietetics was founded," adding that "the reasons of this "true confession" are fully and perspicuously specified, and the first forms the key-note of the rest."

The pamphlet is used as a citation in several publications, regarding diet and veganism. It appears in Henry Alfred Burd's 1916 work Joseph Ritson: A Critical Biography, and Seton Dearden's 1939 work The Gypsy Gentleman: A Study of George Borrow.
