= Neelagandeeswarar Temple =

Neelagandeeswara temple

Religion
- Affiliation: Hinduism
- District: Chennai
- Deity: Neelagandeeswara

Location
- Location: (Neelankarai)
- State: Tamil Nadu
- Country: India

Architecture
- Type: Dravidian architecture

Neelagandeeswarar Temple is a Hindu temple located at Neelankarai, a southern neighbourhood of Chennai, India.

The temple is dedicated to Neelagandeeswara (Shiva).

== See also ==
- Religion in Chennai
