= Vegan school meal =

Optional school meal that is vegan

A vegan school meal or vegan school lunch or vegan school dinner or vegan hot lunch is a vegan option provided as a school meal. A small number of schools around the world serve vegan food or are vegan schools, serving exclusively vegan food.

== Background ==
Traditionally school meals, particularly those served in the United States and Europe, are made with meat and dairy products. In recent years, schools there and in other geographic regions have begun adding vegan and plant-based options.

Culture, politics and government policies determine what food is served at school meals, and schools serving vegan meals are often responding to national policies or demands from local communities. Reasons cited for offering vegan school meals include concerns about nutrition, allergies, cultural diversity and sustainability. Schools that add vegan food options have faced complaints and those that do not have it have faced criticism.

In the United States, the addition of vegan lunches in schools is related to the Meatless Monday campaign.

In 2006, Vegetarian Journal reported a survey of food service directors in the United States by the School Nutrition Association found "5% of elementary, 6% of middle, and 10% of high schools offer vegan options." By 2017, the School Nutrition Association found 14% of school districts across the country offer vegan lunches compared to 11.5% of schools offering vegan lunch in 2016.

== Political history ==
=== Brazil ===
In 2017, Brazil adopted the Conscious Eating Brazil policy (Alimentação Consciente Brasil) with an aim of increasing fruits and vegetables and decreasing meat in the country's school lunches. The act led to some school districts adding vegan meals.

=== France ===
In France, in accordance with the EGalim law, all school catering must offer at least one vegetarian menu per week since November 1, 2019. This should consist of a single menu based on plant proteins. In August 2021, the Climate and Resilience law passed in August 2021 confirmed the obligation of a weekly vegetarian menu. This vegetarian menu can be vegan.

=== Germany ===
In Berlin, Germany, in 2016, an administrative court ruled that schools are not obligated to provide vegan school meals.

=== Israel ===
In 2016, the Israel Ministry of Health mandated that all schools serve weekly vegetarian meals, some of which are vegan.

=== United Kingdom ===
In 2026, school food standards were updated in the United Kingdom to take effect in September 2027. The new standards ban honey and classify legumes and baked beans as a protein serving. Houmous has been added as a permitted snack and pea protein milk as a permitted serving of dairy.

In 2020, Paul McCartney signed a letter to education secretary Gavin Williamson, which asked that the government change the requirement to serve meat and dairy and allow schools to serve vegetarian and vegan meals. The campaign to change the UK School Food Standards is led by People for the Ethical Treatment of Animals and supporters include Greenpeace and the Royal Society for Public Health. In 2022, the Oxfordshire County Council voted to provide vegan meals in schools two days a week and farmers protested.

=== United States ===
In 2019, the Healthy Climate-Friendly School Lunch Act, which would mandate vegan options in all schools, was introduced into the state of California's legislature in the United States.

== Examples of vegan lunch options ==
Vegan school lunches being served by schools include sloppy joes in Teofilândia, Brazil, hummus pizza and Kung Pao tofu in Portland, Maine, US, root vegetable soup in Porvoo, Finland, vegan chicken nuggets in Deerfield, Illinois, US, vegan quesadillas and Sichuan noodles in Kittery, Maine, US, falafel sandwiches and stuffed vegan peppers at Fort Walton Beach, Florida, US, and vegan tamale and vegan teriyaki burgers in Los Angeles, California, US. At Our Lady of Sion School in Worthing, West Sussex, England, school dinners include Fillet Fisch burger with tartare sauce and chips, butternut squash and sweet potato Tikka Masala with rice, and tofu tacos with Asian slaw.

In 2022, New York City public schools adopted Vegan Fridays and serve vegan lunches on Fridays. These include chickpea wraps and veggie tacos.

== Vegan schools ==
Vegan schools are schools that only serve vegan food to students.

In 2015, the MUSE School in Calabasas, California, became the first vegan K–12 school in the United States.

The German International School in Chennai, India, adopted veganism since the 2017–2018 academic year, becoming the first vegan K–12 school in India.

In February 2022, the Our Lady of Sion School, an independent day school in Worthing, West Sussex, England, became the first school in the country to have a fully vegan school kitchen. It partners with Plant Based School Kitchens.

== Vegan dining halls ==
Vegan dining halls are campus dining halls that exclusively offer plant-based meals.

North Texas University has offered a vegan-only dining hall since 2011. The dining hall has blazed many trails during the past 10 years, including reducing the university’s carbon footprint through Mean Green Acres. The hydroponic garden was built inside a specially designed, upcycled freight trailer behind the dining hall. At any given time, five to 11 different varieties of lettuce and herbs are grown in the container. On average, the dining hall serves more than 1,000 guests per day. In response to its popularity on campus, plans are underway to expand Mean Greens Café and the on-campus hydroponic garden program.

In 2012, the University of California San Diego opened the Roots dining hall, which is fully vegan.

== Plant-Based Universities campaign ==
The Plant-Based Universities campaign is a student-run campaign begun in 2021 by Animal Rising with the goal of 100% plant-based catering in universities

in response to the climate crisis. Its chapters have initiated votes in students' unions. University of Birmingham, University College London, University of Stirling, and Queen Mary universities have voted to initiate 100% plant-based menus. In 2023, more than 650 academics wrote a letter urging universities to support the campaign.

In 2022, the Student Union at the University of Stirling in Stirling, Scotland, voted to become a vegan university as part of the campaign. The university, with about 17,000 students, will become 50% vegan for the 2023-2024 academic year and 100% vegan by 2025.

In 2024, the Student Union at Lancaster University voted to join the Plant-Based Universities campaign. The students voted for the university to make 50% of the menu plant-based by 2025 and fully plant-based by 2027.

== Influence ==
The concern over climate change is causing more governments to lower emissions, including serving food with the least climate footprint. Friends of the Earth said that vegan school meals are beneficial for the planet, for the health of students and for the finances of the school system. But in many school districts, the meat and dairy lobby retains its power, and in the United States schools are required to serve and promote cow's milk. Those advocating for vegan lunch include Sir Paul McCartney, New York City Mayor Eric Adams, journalist Avery Yale Kamila, environmental advocate Suzy Amis Cameron, the Physicians Committee for Responsible Medicine, The Vegan Society, the Humane Society's Forward Food programme, and the U.S.-based New York Coalition for Healthy School Food.

== See also ==
- Meat-free days
- Meatless Monday
- Plant-based action plan
- Veganuary
- Vegan veto vote
- World Vegan Day
