= Raja Nagar =

- town
- Location within Chennai Location within Tamil Nadu Location within India
- Coordinates: 12.94192°N 80.25446°E
- Country: India
- State: Tamil Nadu
- Metro: Chennai

Languages
  - Official: Tamil
- Time zone: UTC+5:30 (IST)
- PIN: 600041

Raja Nagar (Tamil: ராஜா நகர்) is a residential township in Chennai, India. It is located in Neelangarai, a suburb of Chennai, situated about six kilometers from the city center of Adyar.

The neighboring areas include:

- Palavakkam to the north;
- VGP Golden Beach to the south;
- Bay of Bengal on the east side; and
- IT Highway on the western part.
