= VFC (company) =

British vegan food company

- Type: Private company
- Industry: Vegan cuisine
- Founded: December 2020; 5 years ago
- Founders: Matthew Glover, Adam Lyons
- Headquarters: North Yorkshire, United Kingdom
- Products: Meat analogue
- Website: vfcfoods.com

VFC Foods is a British vegan food company that started trading in December 2020. An acronym for "Vegan Fried Chicken", it was founded by Matthew Glover and Adam Lyons in York, England. The company specialises in creating meat substitute products for fried chicken. Glover is the co-founder of the Veganuary movement and uses his experience in vegan activism to promote the brand.

VFC expanded during its first year of trading, growing from an online store based in York to a company supplying products internationally. PETA have recognised VFC and awarded it with their "Best Vegan Chicken" accolade.

== History ==
VFC uses plant-based ingredients such as wheat protein to create meat substitute foods that mimic fried chicken products. The products are coated in a cornflake crispy coating. VFC is an acronym for "vegan fried chick*n". The company was founded by Matthew Glover and Adam Lyons in York, United Kingdom. Glover is a businessman and vegan activist who alongside his wife helped creating the Veganuary movement in 2014. Lyons is a chef and restaurateur.

The idea to create the business occurred when Glover attended Lyons' restaurant, Source. Glover ordered the vegan fried chicken menu option and wanted more people to try the product. Lyons' experience visiting a chicken farm made him determined to invest in veganism and launch the business. Their creation was also part of a protest against the factory farming of chickens. At the time, Glover told Maxine Gordon from The Press that "this is where food meets activism. This is our sit-down protest." VFC is one of the several vegan brands created in the Yorkshire region, helping to bolster the area's economy and reputation in the meat-free food business.

Glover and Lyons worked with Born Ugly to create their branding. They used their brand image to promote junk food in a positive manner. This strategy was unconventional for the food category that usually promotes itself in a righteous way. The VFC packaging features stylised graffiti and vegan campaign messaging. Its main retail products are vegan chicken fillets, vegan chicken bites and vegan popcorn chicken. The products were initially made available for purchase online only, via their own website store. Glover and Lyons employed a sales director to help them secure placements in British supermarkets. In their first month of trading, VFC amassed forty-eight thousand pounds in sales and ran low on stock due to unexpected consumer demand. In early 2021, £2.5 million was invested in the company from financial backers including Glover's own Veg Capital and the separate Johnson Resolutions. In October 2021, VFC secured their first deal with British supermarket Tesco to stock their products. That month, VFC won the "Best Vegan Chicken" accolade at the 2021 PETA Vegan Food Awards.

VFC expanded to international markets. In their first year, they began selling their products in Spain and the Netherlands. In September 2021, it was announced that VFC were launching their products in the United States. Glover also announced that they had attracted business interest in fifty additional countries. In December 2021, VFC showcased at the Plant Based World Expo in New York City as one of the anchor stands.

VFC has become known for its animal rights advocacy and promotional stunts, attracting media attention. In addition, the brand repeatedly shares bold and humorous slogans across social media. They partnered with the actor Peter Egan and carried out undercover filming to expose conditions at a chicken factory farm in Shropshire. VFC have pledged to fight online harassment from anti-vegan trolls on social media. Glover has stated that engaging with trolls helped to grow the brand's profile. Another publicity stunt VFC orchestrated was following only one account, the fast food chicken brand KFC on the social media platform Instagram.

In 2021, the company stopped using the term "plant-based" in its marketing material, instead focusing on using the term "vegan".

In 2023, VFC bought the company Meatless Farm out of administration and products under that brand name were sold in Asda supermarkets.

In 2025, VFC entered into a partnership with the US brand Eat Just to bring their egg substitute product, "Just Egg" to the European food market. VFC invested five million pounds into producing the product at their German manufacturing sites.
