= Laura Sophia Temple =

British Romantic poet

- Born: 1763
- Died: Unknown
- Literary movement: Romanticism
- Years active: 1805–1812

Laura Sophia Temple was a British poet and novelist associated with the Romantic movement. During her lifetime, Temple published three volumes of poetry, as well as a novel, Ferdinand Fitzormond; or, The Fool of Nature (1806).

== Life and career ==
Laura Sophia Temple was born in 1763. Her parents were Lieutenant colonel Richard Temple and his wife, Frances Temple. She married Samuel B. Sweetman.

In 1805, Temple published her first book, a volume of poetry titled Poems, with publisher Richard Phillips.

The following year, Temple published the novel Ferdinand Fitzormond; or, The Fool of Nature (1806), also published by Philips. A contemporary review of the novel reads, "Mrs. Temple, the fair author of some excellent poems, of which we took ample notice in our preceding volume, has produced a ponderous novel, entitled Ferdinand Fitzormond."

Temple's second volume of poetry, Lyric and other poems, was published by Longman in 1812.

In 1812, Temple published a collection of poems inspired by the second siege of Zaragosa in the Peninsular War, titled The siege of Zaragosa, and other poems. Scholar Diego Saglia discussed the work in his book Poetic Castiles in Spain: British Romanticism and Figurations of Iberia. Of the poem "The Days of Chivalry," Saglia wrote, "Defining chivalry as the reign of Beauty, Temple's poem mourns the end of this system as the cause of the present troubles in Britain and Europe and, in particular, points out a historical evil in the preponderance of masculine politics not tempered by feminine guidance."

A 1997 study of literature read by William Wordsworth between 1800 and 1815 concluded that Wordsworth had read works by Temple.

== Bibliography ==
- Poems (1805)
- Ferdinand Fitzormond; or, The Fool of Nature (1806)
- Lyric and other poems (1808)
- The siege of Zaragosa, and other poems (1812)
