= German International School, Chennai =

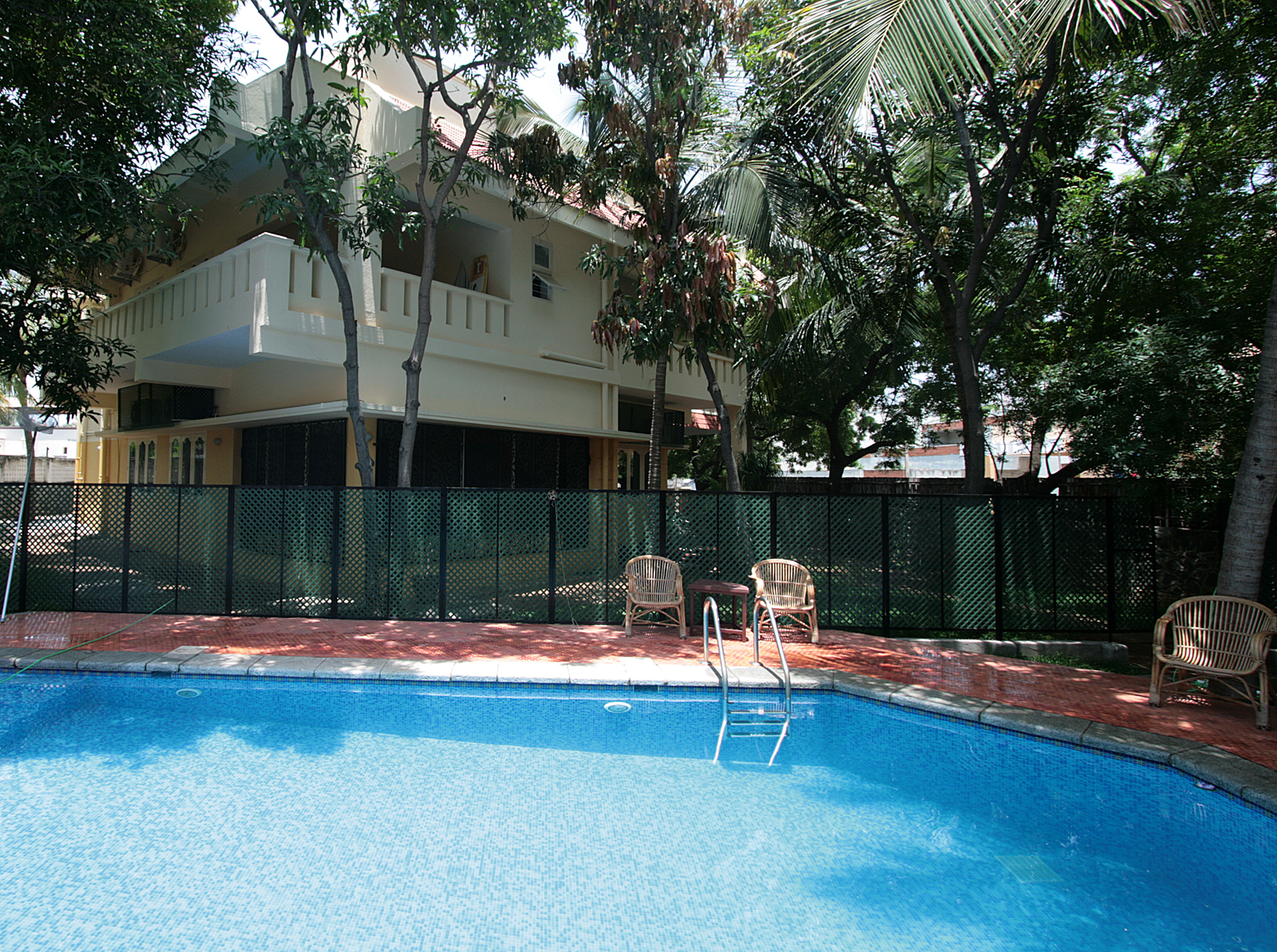

Information
- Established: 2010; 16 years ago
- Grades: K-12
- Enrollment: c.50

The German International School Chennai is a primary and secondary school in Palavakkam, Chennai, India. The school was established in 2010. The school is the first vegan school in India.

== Curriculum ==
The school has kindergarten to Twelfth grade. The school has about 50 students and follows the Edexcel curriculum.

== Adopting vegan lifestyle ==
The school declared itself completely vegan from the academic year 2017–2018, serving the students only vegan food since then. Until the middle of 2016, the school was serving animal products such as pork, chicken, beef, fish and cheese. However, when the school began to shelter injured and abandoned animals, it decided to go vegan as it felt eating meat "was ethically not right." In October 2016, the school officially decided to go vegan and starting serving vegan diet for all the three meals, viz. breakfast, lunch, and evening snack. In December 2016, the school arranged for a vegan buffet, inviting parents and announcing the decision. The school started baking its own bread and making its own mock meat and vegan cheese from cashews.

In January 2017, the school was awarded the "Compassionate School Award" from People for the Ethical Treatment of Animals (PETA).

== See also ==
- Vegan school meal
- MUSE School
