= HappyCow =

Online service

- Formation: November 1999; 27 years ago
- Founder: Eric Brent
- Location: Santa Monica, California, U.S.
- Products: Restaurant guide, travel guides, recipes
- Methods: Website, mobile apps
- Fields: Vegetarianism, veganism
- Website: happycow.net

HappyCow is a mobile app and website that lists vegan and vegan-friendly restaurants. It also lists farmers markets, health food stores and other businesses with a vegan focus.

== History ==
HappyCow was founded in 1999 by Eric Brent as an online food guide to help travelers find vegan options around the world. In 2011, the mobile app was launched on both Apple and Android and has been downloaded over 4 million times. The app offers translation in 12 languages. It is the largest online platform of its kind specializing in vegan food discovery.

The platform hosts over 220,000 businesses in over 180 countries, with over 1.5 million reviews, more than 2 million photos, and 14 million monthly listing views. The directory contains restaurants, cafes, bakeries, juice bars, food trucks, catering services, shops and food stores which are either fully vegan or offer vegan options.

The initial definition for veg-friendly was based on a minimum menu content being at least 60% vegetarian. This has since been modified into a more flexible set of guidelines based on the alternative availability of vegan food in the area. Listings are categorized based on the following definitions:

- Vegan: Food businesses that serve fully vegan food. No animal products are used in the kitchen.
- Vegetarian: Food businesses where some of the food is fully vegan, but dairy, egg, and/or honey may also be used in some dishes.
- Veg-Options: Food businesses whose menu includes some fully vegan dishes, but meat, dairy, and/or egg is also prominent in dishes. The menu must include 3 or more fully vegan options to be listed on HappyCow, unless the area has limited vegan options.

Other listings include vegan friendly accommodation, social and activity groups, and other entities with consideration for animal compassion. The website has forum, blog and recipe sections.

The HappyCow YouTube channel was launched in 2012.

In 2021, founder Eric Brent sold the company. In 2025, the company was sold to Claudia Torres and laid off staff. Torres, based in the EU, announced on social media that it would raise further capital to expand into hotel listings and existing company VeggieHotels.

== Functionality ==
HappyCow offers various functions to help users discover businesses nearby. This includes map search, list search, categories, events and the ability to add business in Favorites and Trip lists. Users can add and update businesses to HappyCow, leave reviews and follow and message users. As users engage in activities on the platform, they receive points and rewards.

Members who are particularly active can apply to become Ambassadors, enjoying exclusive perks. There are currently over 600 HappyCow Ambassadors worldwide.

Business owners have the option to claim their HappyCow listing, providing them with access to an Owner’s Dashboard. Once their listing is claimed, the owner can edit the business’s information, respond to reviews, and upgrade the listing to a paid plan.

== Financing ==
HappyCow Inc. is registered as a stock corporation in California, with an address in Hong Kong. HappyCow states it is "a free-to-use site, non-profit in nature but not 501-c status". Income generated is recycled into the running of the operation. Sources of funding include advertisements, business sponsorships, app downloads, and user contributions.

In 2014, The HappyCow Cookbook: Recipes from Top-Rated Vegan Restaurants around the World was published.

In 2022, HappyCow launched a new business advertising program called Partner Program, allowing businesses to pay for advertising on top of search results. The Partner Program includes three tiers — Premium, Essentials and Lite — and is available to any business with a listing.

== Notable projects and collaborations ==
HappyCow releases a regular report noting the top vegan-friendly cities in the world. After a two-year hiatus, due to the COVID-19 pandemic, the report returned in 2022. Cities that are frequently at the top of the list include London, Berlin, and Barcelona.

In addition to independent projects, HappyCow frequently collaborates with other vegan and vegan-friendly brands and organizations, including Plant Based Treaty. Since 2022, HappyCow has supported Veganuary by launching a special Veganuary app feed, dedicated to providing users with vegan inspiration, ideas and community.

In 2020, the platform partnered with car manufacturer Toyota to integrate its restaurant guide into the Destination Assist feature on select 2020 and newer Toyota and Lexus models.

== Honours and awards ==
- Winner of eleven consecutive VegNews' Veggieawards as Favorite Website (most recently in 2017)
- Winner of Best Travel App by PETA in 2019
- Winner of Best Vegan Online Resource by VegFest in 2018
- Named Best of the Best at the 2018 Swiss Vegan Awards
- Named App of the Day by App Store in 2018
- Top 50 vegetarian blogs 2012 awarded by the Institute for the Psychology of Eating
- Top 100 vegetarian food websites awarded by web100.com
