= Richard Phillips (publisher) =

English schoolteacher, author, publisher and vegetarianism activist

Sir Richard Phillips
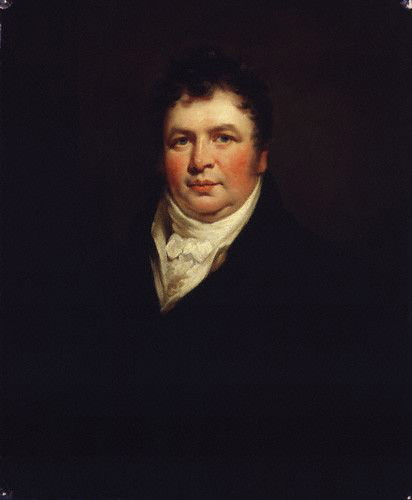
- Portrait by James Saxon, oil on canvas (1806)
- Born: 13 December 1767; London, England, United Kingdom
- Died: 2 April 1840 (aged 72); Brighton, England, United Kingdom
- Burial place: St. Nicholas Churchyard, Brighton, United Kingdom
- Occupations: Publisher, Schoolteacher, Author
- Notable work: A Morning's Walk From London to Kew (1817), the Monthly Magazine
- Title: Sheriff of the City of London
- Term: 1807-1808
- Political party: Whigs
- Criminal charges: Selling Thomas Paine's Rights of Man, Part Second (1 count) and Charles Pigott's Jockey Club, Part Second (1 count)
- Criminal penalty: 18 months in prison
- Honours: Knight Bachelor

Sir Richard Phillips (13 December 1767 – 2 April 1840) was an English schoolteacher, author, publisher and vegetarianism activist. Phillips was a staunch advocate for freedom of the press in Britain and a proponent of the interrogative system of education. Phillips was widely recognized for his radical politics and enterprising approach to his publishing endeavours.

From 1807 to 1808, Phillips served as one of the annually elected Sheriffs of the City of London. Alongside his co-Sheriff, Christopher Smith, Phillips established the Sheriff's Fund and implemented new sanitary measures, such as limewashing, at Newgate Prison. Following his shrievalty, Phillips was honoured with the rank of Knight Bachelor by King George III on 30 March 1808.

== Early life ==
Phillips was born in London on 13 December 1767. Phillips was raised on his family's Leicestershire farm alongside his brother. He attended schools in Soho Square and Chiswick; in A Morning's Walk From London to Kew, Phillips reminisces on his time at Chiswick, noting the distinctive school bells. Phillips' education was funded by his uncle, and he was initially encouraged to take over his uncle's proprietorship of the Lion Brewery in Soho. After Phillips completed his education, his father had hoped to include him in the family's farm business, however Phillips had no interest in the profession and chose to move to London instead. Unfortunately, due to poor economic and trade conditions in London, Phillips ended his stay and moved back home to his parents' farm.

Phillips then moved out of his family's farm and into his own ground floor room in Leicester. From there, Phillips worked as schoolteacher where he taught children spelling, reading, writing, and arithmetic. Eventually, Phillips became unsatisfied with the profits and general expectations with his role as a teacher and quit to set up a hosiery line in a small shop. Phillips began The Leicester Herald in May 1792 after concluding that politics was a profitable sector due to its widespread appeal; the herald continued until April 1795.

== Trial and imprisonment ==
On 6 December 1792, a copy of Thomas Paine’s Rights of Man, Part Second, was sold at Phillips’ Leicester bookshop by his shopman, Henry Popplewell. The book was sold to a shoemaker, James Jackson, who had been contracted by the Leicester prosecution and the town-clerk William Heyrick to purchase a copy of Rights of Man specifically from Phillips’ shop. On 18 December 1792, Thomas Paine underwent trial, in absentia, for seditious libel and was found guilty.

At the 18 January 1793 session of the Leicester Borough Court, three different indictments were brought against Phillips, including one for the sale of Charles Pigott's Jockey Club and two for the sale of Paine's Rights of Man. Phillips was taken to the court by a warrant and made to pay £1200 bail. Phillips’ trial began on 12 April 1793, and concluded with his sentencing at the Leicester Borough Court on 13 April 1793. Phillips was found guilty of selling the second part of Rights of Man and the second part of Jockey Club, but he was acquitted on his third indictment due to a defect in the evidence. Ultimately, Phillips was sentenced to eighteen months in prison.

According to Phillips’ and Popplewell's affidavits from 13 April 1793, both men maintain that they were not aware of any legal notice or proclamation that Paine's Rights of Man or Pigott's Jockey Club were considered libellous. Phillips and Popplewell both stated that they believed Rights of Man could be easily found and purchased at all other Leicester book sellers until after Paine's 18 December verdict.

Phillips addressed the public through his journal, the Leicester Herald, shortly after the sentencing on 20 and 27 April 1793. While serving his sentence at the Leicester Gaol, Philips was attended to by the famous jailer Daniel Lambert. Phillips enjoyed a friendly relationship with Lambert, and as a result was permitted to continue with his work and receive several notable visitors, including Lord Moira and Charles Howard, 11th Duke of Norfolk.

== Return to London and publishing career ==
On 18 November 1795, a nearby fire on Gallowtree Gate reached Phillips' property, destroying all of his books and papers. Following the fire and experiencing some political difficulties in Leicester (being imprisoned in 1792 for selling Thomas Paine's Rights of Man), he returned to London, established premises in Paternoster Row, St. Paul's Churchyard, and founded The Monthly Magazine in 1796; its editor was Dr. John Aikin, and among its early contributors were fellow radicals William Godwin and Thomas Holcroft.

In 1796, Phillips married Elizabeth Griffiths, a milliner's employee and the daughter of Captain John Griffiths of Tenby. The anonymously published Memoirs of the Public and Private Life of Sir Richard Phillips, Knight, High Sheriff for the City of London and County of Middlesex. Impartially Compiled from authentic documents, By A Citizen of London, and Assistants (1808) details the couple's introduction and the circumstances of their engagement: Upon his return to London, Phillips boarded at the home of a well-respected milliner, Mrs. Blacklin, and her staff of young women. With his diet restricted simply to vegetables in case of any lard or other animal products in seemingly safe dishes, Phillips mentioned his predicament to the lady of the house. When he came home that evening, he found a vegetable pie left specifically for him. He quickly learned that the pie was prepared by one of the milliner's employees, and Phillips immediately offered his hand in marriage as a reward. The couple had several children together, including their sons Alfred and Richard, and their daughters, Elizabeth, Laura, and Emily.

Phillips built up a prominent fortune based on the speculative commission of newly revised textbooks and their publication, in a competitive market that had been freed by the House of Lords' decision in 1777 to strike down the perpetual copyright asserted by a small group of London booksellers to standard introductory works. His Juvenile Library published in 1800–03 provided the steady returns of all successful children's books.

By 1807, Phillips was in sufficient standing to serve as a Sheriff of London, and was knighted on 30 May 1808 on the occasion of presenting an address to King George III. In 1808, Phillips and his co-Sheriff, Christopher Smith, founded the Sheriff's Fund to provide financial and material assistance to prisoners and their families or dependents. Donations were primarily collected through poor boxes and allowed prisoners to purchase clothing, food, coal, candles, and other necessities. John Timbs states that there were no public executions held outside the Old Bailey during Phillips' shrievalty, but there is no other evidence to support this claim.

In the early hours of 29 July 1810, a fire was discovered in Hanging Sword Alley at the printing office of Mr. Thomas Gillet, which printed and housed some of Phillips stock. Flames destroyed five homes in the surrounding alley, as well as the entirety of Phillips’ valuable stock of books and documents. Initial reports of the incident note public suspicion of the cause of the fire, citing the occurrence of three previous fires at the office between 1805 and 1810. Popular periodicals such as The Satirist, or Monthly Meteor and The Scourge, or, Monthly Expositor of Imposture and Folly discussed the Gillet fire and its connection to Phillips; one of Phillips’ creditors anonymous submitted a letter to The Scourge detailing his suspicion that Gillet orchestrated the fire to commit insurance fraud.

Another of the contributors to Phillips's Monthly Magazine was the Scottish novelist John Galt. Angela Esterhammer has suggested that the character Masano, an irascible Italian printer in Galt's Andrew of Padua, the Improvisatore (1820), is based on Phillips.

== Retirement and death ==
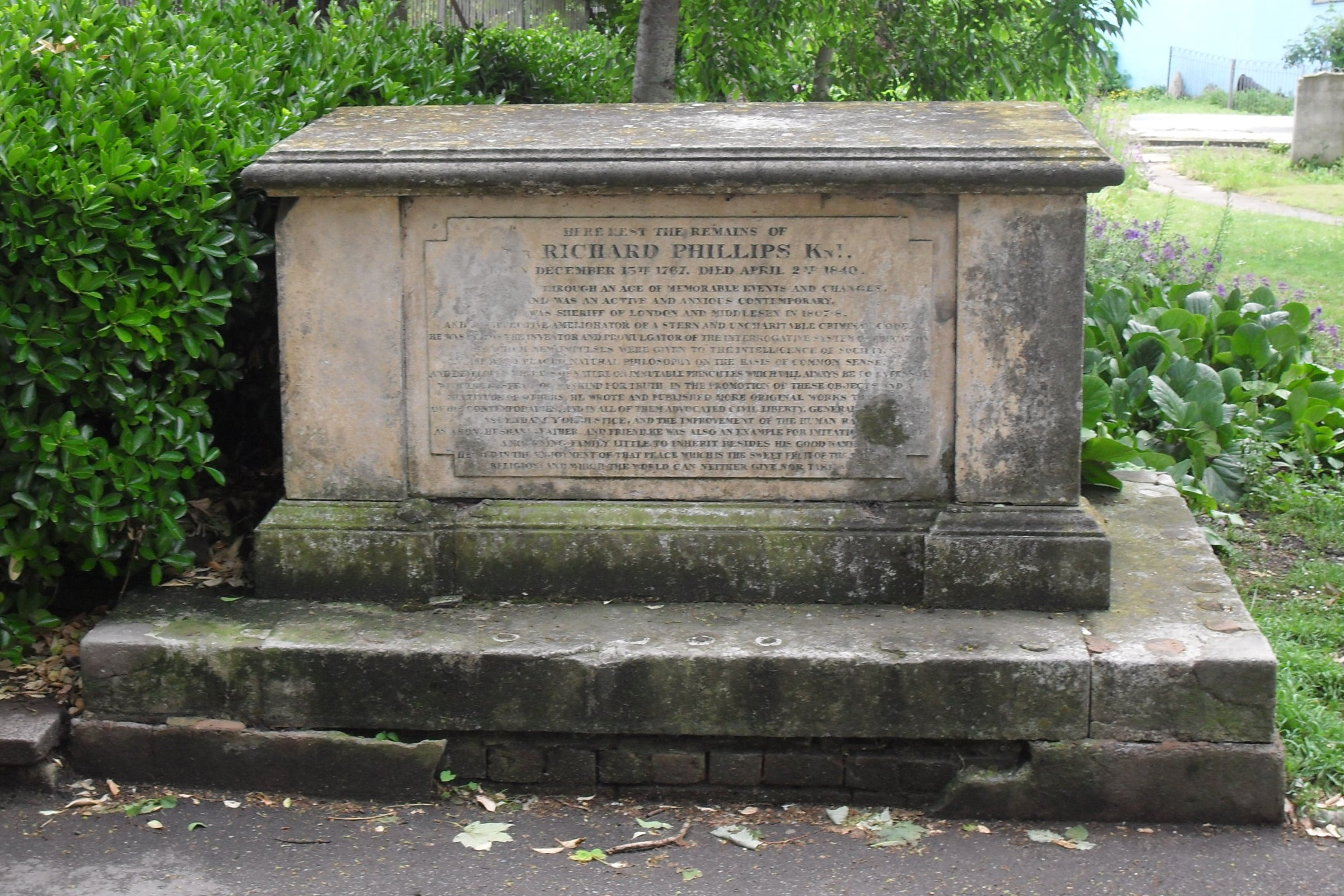
Phillips's grave in the western extension of St Nicholas' Church burial ground, Brighton.

In 1823, Phillips sold one third of his successful literary properties, retired to Brighton, and continued to work on several reference books. His Million of Facts was published in 1825, followed by the commencement of his Golden Rules of Social Philosophy series in 1826.

Phillips overextended himself and was declared bankrupt in the Bank Panic; two different banks, both with connections to Phillips, collapsed on the same day, resulting in a devastating financial loss for Phillips between £40-50,000. Although Phillips swiftly traveled to London in an attempt to mitigate his loss, it is understood that he mainly blamed the Ministry and Parliament rather than his debtors.

Timbs writes of his final visit to Phillips in the autumn of 1839 in Walks and Talks About London: "We found the old bookmaker—he always maintained that Euclid was but a bookmaker—full of years and memories, but infirm in health. We talked over various matters; and he summed up his long life, saying he was ‘past crying for the cake.’ There was the old study, well filled with books and papers; but the master seemed to have done his work."

Phillips died in Brighton on 2 April 1840, aged 72. His remains were originally interred in the north-west corner of St Nicholas Churchyard, but currently rest in the western extension of the cemetery. The following is inscribed on his tomb:

Here rest the Remains of Sir Richard Phillips, Knt., Born December 13, 1767; died April 2, 1840. He lived through an age of memorable events and changes, and was an active and anxious contemporary. He was Sheriff of London and Middlesex in 1807-8, and an effective ameliorator of a stern and uncharitable Criminal Code. He was, in 1798, the inventor and promulgator of the Interrogative System of Education, by which new impulses were given to the intelligence of society. He also placed Natural Philosophy on the basis of common sense, and developed the laws of Nature on immutable principles, which will always be coextensive with the respect of mankind for truth. In the promotion of these objects, and a multitude of others, he wrote and published more original works than any of his contemporaries; and in all of these advocated Civil Liberty, General Benevolence, Ascendency of Justice, and the Improvement of the Human Race. As a Son, Husband, Father, and Friend, he was also an example for imitation; and left a mourning family little to inherit besides his good name, He died in the enjoyment of that peace which is the sweet fruit of the Christian Religion; and which the world can neither give nor take away

== Vegetarianism ==
Phillips was a vegetarian beginning at age nine and practiced the lifestyle for upwards of sixty-six years until his death. In an 1837 letter written for a friend in Yorkshire, Phillips describes that his apprehension for animal foods began when he accidentally witnessed a public slaughterhouse in 1780 around age nine. Alternatively, Phillips recounts in his memoir that he was motivated to abstain from animal foods after he returned to Leicester from London, and he was served a heifer he was fond of at his father's farm. Phillips' family was not receptive to his new diet, and though futile, had attempted to coerce him into eating animal foods by depriving a young Phillips of many things. It was not until he was eighteen years old and responsible for himself, that Phillips felt he could freely pursue vegetarianism without the pressure of his family's disagreement. His diet was primarily based on potatoes which were mashed and mixed with seasonal vegetables. Additionally, Phillips made use of seasonings such as salt and pepper, as well as pure olive oil and butter.

In 1811 Phillips wrote a list of sixteen reasons in favour of vegetarianism under the pseudonym Common Sense in the Medical and Physical Journal that he himself published. This list would be republished in other texts, notably Phillips' The Monthly Magazine, and an expanded twenty-two reasons in his Golden Rules of Social Philosophy (1826). According to his list of reasons, Phillips advocated for vegetarianism due to the suffering and cruelty against animals at the hands of humans, especially since he considered animals as sentient beings equal to humans. In line with his politics of progress, Phillips additionally considered that the killing and consumption of animals posed as a barrier to the growth of a civilised society, because he associated the consumption of animal products with barbaric and uncivilised peoples. Phillips believed a plant based diet was a just alternative to eating animals as he did not consider plants to be sensitive beings which could feel pain when harvested. Further, Phillips recommended the consumption of plant foods for health benefits and because it emphasised one's self-control and morality.

Vegetarianism in the Romantic-era was a growing movement and Phillips involved himself in the same social circle of prominent vegetarian figures such as Percy Shelley. As a publisher, Phillips contributed to the movement by publishing notable works of vegetarian authors such as Joseph Ritson's An Essay on Abstinence from Animal Food, as a Moral Duty in 1802. Phillips' own works on vegetarianism were taken seriously and often quoted by other vegetarians, as seen in an article by William Alcott in The American Vegetarian and Health Journal. Phillips’ belief that vegetarianism could solve the United Kingdom's concern towards food supply and overpopulation was also quoted in multiple articles written for publications such as The Aberdeen Journal and The Westmorland Gazette. On the contrary, Phillips’ friend William Cobbett criticised Phillips and the vegetarian movement primarily due to the hypocrisy of those who claimed to be against animal suffering. Cobbett highlights that despite Phillips’ strict diet abstaining from animal flesh, Phillps still participated in animal cruelty by making use of animal skins for his shoes and the books he sold, as well as the feathers of a fowl to write with a quill.

== Reputation ==
Phillips was widely recognised as a prolific publisher who received support, but also controversy for his radical politics. Phillips was labelled as a "dirty little jacobin" and was often the target of conservative competitors. Despite his political controversies, Phillips’ work and literary contributions earned him a fair reputation as a person of importance, who has yet to receive the recognition he deserves.

As a publisher, Phillips was known for the large output of books he printed yearly, particularly in the school market where multiple editions of books were sold. Following his accomplishments, some developed the opinion that Phillips’ great qualities had become spoiled by his success. In The Belfast Monthly Magazine, a frustrated writer describes Phillips as a publisher of considerable eminence, but also as a daring speculator who has injured literature. The writer observes that although authors were well paid for their copyright, Phillips’ costly embellishments left the final selling price of the books primarily accessible to the aristocratic class.

While Phillips received recognition and praise for his impactful work as a publisher, his personal written works, such as attempts in expanding scientific theories, faced some criticism. Responding to Phillips’ scientific effort and anti-Newtonian theories, mathematician Augustus De Morgan notes that in spite of Phillips' honesty, zeal, ability, and courage, his uninformed ideas will leave him poorly remembered.

== Works ==
Phillips was the author, under his own name, of On the Powers and Duties of Juries, and on the Criminal Laws of England, 1811; A Morning's Walk from London to Kew, 1817; A Personal Tour Through the United Kingdom, 1828.

Many of his further works were published under at least five pseudonyms including, as Rev. David Blair for An Easy Grammar of Natural and Experimental Philosophy (first ed. 1807) and A Grammar of Chemistry (first ed. 1810). Due to his radical and controversial reputation, Phillips had to utilize pseudonyms to publish many of his school books. Phillips also contributed anti-government pieces to The Monthly Magazine under the pseudonym Common Sense, following his release from prison for selling Thomas Paine's Rights of Man. Additionally, under the pseudonym Common Sense, Phillips published multiple attempts to confute Newton's theory of gravity in The Monthly Magazine.

Phillips was responsible for publishing The Juvenile Library (1800-1803), a periodical which was also published under the names The Monthly Preceptor and the Juvenile Encyclopedia. The periodical aimed to provide useful information for school-age children, covering a range of subjects including—but not limited to—natural philosophy, ancient and modern history, and botany. While not all of Phillips’ school books were explicitly political, the contents of The Juvenile Library was deliberately organized to include a liberal voice. The publication had a cost of one shilling and sixpence per number, limiting it to a middle-class readership, as well as to tutors and governesses for the wealthy. A notable feature of the periodical was the involvement of children, specifically through their essays in response to prize questions, translations of various prose, and submissions of original poetry. The magazine also received submissions from children who would later become notable figures, such as Leigh Hunt, George Ormerod, and Thomas De Quincey.

His own political leanings, evinced in Golden Rules of Social Philosophy, Or, A New System of Practical Ethics (1826) encouraged him to publish works by the radical jobbing writer of educational texts, Jeremiah Joyce, though often under pseudonymous disguises; Rees and Britten asserted in their Reminiscences of Literary London that many works were written by Phillips and attributed to well-known writers, who oversaw the proofs and put their names to the manuscripts, for remuneration. Joyce was the actual author of Gregory's Encyclopedia published by Phillips.

- Sir Richard Phillips's Reasons for Not Eating Animal Food, Or Any Thing that Has Enjoyed Sensitive Life (1814)
- Golden Rules of Social Philosophy, Or, A New System of Practical Ethics (1826)
- A Million of Facts: Connected with the Studies, Pursuits, and Interests of Mankind, Serving as a Common-place Book of Useful Reference on All Subjects of Research and Curiosity (1835)
- A Million of Facts of: Correct Data and Elementary Information Concerning the Entire Circle of the Sciences, and on All Subjects of Speculation and Practice (1839)

=== Selected works published by Phillips ===
- The British Nepos (1798) by William Fordyce Mavor
- Pizarro (1799) and The Virgin of the Sun (1799) by August von Kotzebue
- An Historical Account of the Discovery and Education of a Savage Man (1802) by Jean Marc Gaspard Itard
- A Tale of Mystery (1802) and Hear Both Sides (1803) by Thomas Holcroft
- Poems (1805) by Laura Sophia Temple
- Virtuous poverty (1804) and The maid, wife, and widow (1806) by Henry Siddons
- The Novice of Saint Dominick (1805) and The Wild Irish Girl (1806) by Sydney Owenson (Lady Morgan)
- The Farmer's Calendar (1809) by Arthur Young
- A voyage of discovery to the Strait of Magellan (1820) by José de Vargas Ponce
- A voyage round the world, between the years 1816-1819 (1823) by Camille de Roquefeuil
