= Meatless Farm =

U.K. company making plant-based meat substitutes

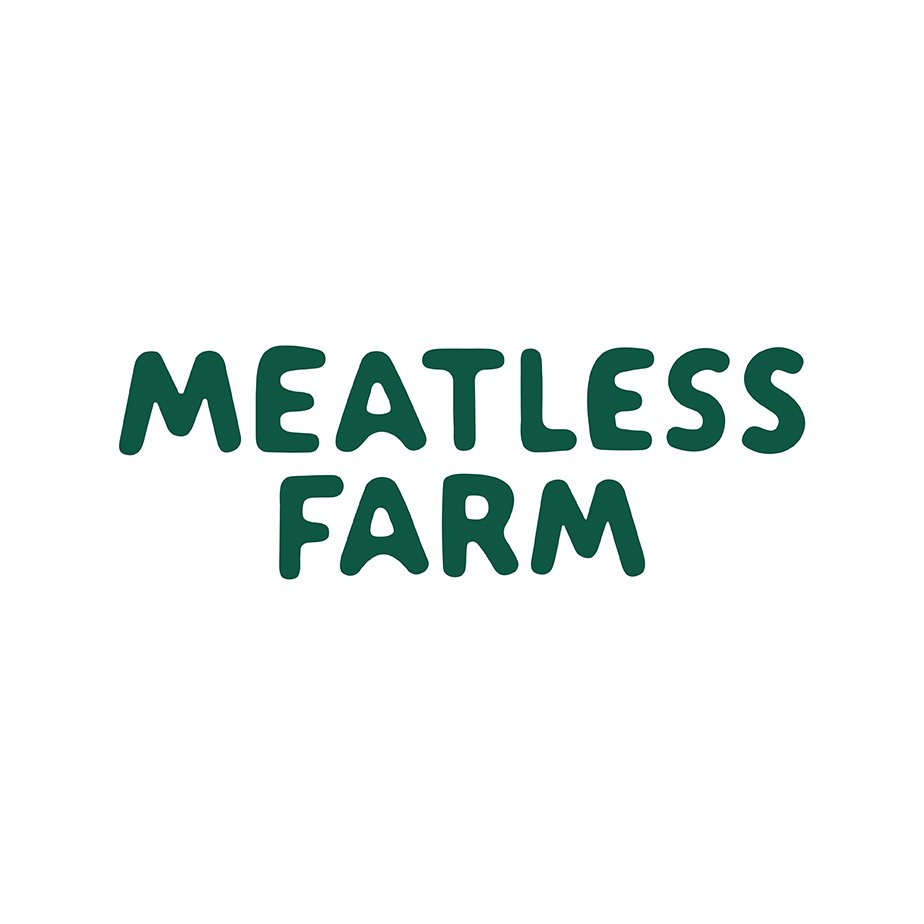
- Company type: Private
- Industry: Food
- Founded: 2016; 10 years ago
- Founder: Morten Toft Bech
- Headquarters: Leeds, U.K.
- Products: Meat analogues
- Number of employees: 100
- Website: meatlessfarm.com

Meatless Farm is a British company that produces vegan, plant-based meats which are made primarily from pea protein. It was founded in 2016 by the Danish entrepreneur, Morten Toft Bech.

== History ==
The company produces plant-based meats which are made primarily from pea protein. It was founded in 2016 by Morten Toft Bech, a Danish entrepreneur who engaged food scientists to develop a vegetable-based substitute. As of October 2020, Meatless Farm employs 100 people in Leeds, Amsterdam, New York, and Singapore.

The company started production in 2018, and initially sold its products in British supermarkets. In September 2019, Meatless Farm expanded to the United States through a partnership with American supermarket Whole Foods. In October its burger became the first plant-based burger to be added to the menu of British pub chain Wetherspoons.

In September 2020, Meatless Farm secured £24m of funding. The company had previously raised £14m from investors including Channel 4.

On 12 June 2023, Meatless Farm made its entire 50 strong workforce redundant and entered administration.

The company was bought out of administration by VFC Foods in August 2023 and products under the brand name will reappear in Asda supermarkets.

== See also ==
- List of meat substitutes
