= Matthew Glover =

British businessman and animal rights activist

- Occupations: Veganuary founder; businessman
- Known for: Veganuary; Veg Capital; VFC
- Spouse: Jane Land

Matthew Glover is a British businessman and animal rights activist. He is the co-founder of the Veganuary movement, which his then wife Jane Land helped to create. In 2019, Glover founded Generation Vegan (formerly known as Million Dollar Vegan), a global education charity focused on veganism. In addition he is the founder of Veg Capital, which helps fund vegan food businesses. In December 2020, Glover and Adam Lyons created the vegan food brand VFC, a business that went onto become an international venture.

== Career and personal life ==
Glover was married to Jane Land, and they lived near York. Glover came from a family of butchers and converted to veganism. His interest was initially with animal welfare and sustainability. Together, Glover and Land attended street activism and vegan demonstrations. They felt like they were being ignored and subsequently they wanted to create something productive. The concept of Veganuary was created by Glover and Land in 2014. The campaign aims to get more people eating plant-based foods with the aim to becoming a permanent vegan.

In its first year, Glover and Land put their life savings into the Veganuary project and moved in with Glover's mother. The campaign has surpassed one million sign ups since its launch. By 2022, The Veganuary event has grown to become one of the most successful vegan campaigns worldwide. That year another six-hundred thousand people signed up to take part. In addition more businesses than ever promoted the event.

Glover started his first business aged twenty-one and has built businesses in the construction, glazing and events sectors.

In 2019, Glover launched the "Million Dollar Vegan" (now GenV) charity brand. GenV is dedicated to educating people about the environmental, ethical and health benefits of living a plant-based lifestyle. Its aim is to inspire more people to become vegan and it operates in ten countries. The brand soon received support from Paul McCartney, Chris Packham and Moby. The organisation was founded after Glover and Land, with the backing of McCartney, challenged Pope Francis to become vegan for Lent. In return, they pledged to donate one million dollars to Pope Francis' chosen charity, but he did not accept the challenge. Their second campaign challenged US President Donald Trump to become vegan during January 2020. In exchange for his participation the same one million dollar charity reward was offered, though Trump too declined. Glover is the current president of the charity.

In June 2020, Glover launched a plant-based investment business. The not-for-profit venture was designed to help fund the growth of vegan companies. Glover currently serves as the managing director of the company Veg Capital.

In December 2020, Glover and restaurateur Adam Lyons co-founded the food brand VFC, which specialises in meat free alternatives for fried chicken. The company was founded in York, United Kingdom. Glover treated the brand as a form of business activism against the factory farming of chickens. He told Maxine Gordon from The Press that "this is where food meets activism. This is our sit-down protest." The company experienced rapid growth and secured a supermarket distribution deal with Tesco. In the first year of trading, the business expanded its sales into Spain, Netherlands and the United States markets.

In July 2022, Glover co-founded Sentient Ventures, a new UK venture fund to invest in early-stage growth capital for alt protein startups globally.
