= Plant-Based Universities =

Environmental campaign

Plant-Based Universities is an international student-led campaign calling for universities and Students' Unions to adopt fully plant-based catering rather than optional vegan school meals. The campaign began in late 2021 in response to the climate crisis. Its chapters have initiated votes in Students' Unions and moving on to implementing plant-based catering at their universities. As of October 2026, 32 universities have made plant-based commitments and 15 universities have taken steps towards implementation. There are campaigns at 95+ universities, in 13 European countries: the UK, Belgium, the Netherlands, France, Italy, Poland, Switzerland, Austria,Germany and more.

== Participating universities ==
As of February 2026, the campaign had been successful in the following universities:

- University of Stirling was the first one to move to ban animal products from its outlets. The campaign had been backed by BBC presenter and conservationist Chris Packham. Journalist and activist George Monbiot also expressed his support, saying the students were "leading the way in tackling the climate crisis and creating a sustainable food system". The decision was met with significant pushback by animal farmers and the Countryside Alliance. The university now has a fully plant-based café.
- Students at the University of Cambridge also voted in favour of a transition to fully plant-based menus. However, the ultimate decision lies with the university.
- Newcastle University's Student Council voted to ensure at least 50% of food is plant-based at its ticketed events, and up to 100% where possible. A subsequent vote in May 2025 increased the minimum requirement to 66%. This motion resulted in increased lobbying from the Students' Union aimed at the University, bringing in more plant-based food options on campus.
- In a vote which attracted the highest turnout in the University of Kent's history, 450 students voted for university-run catering facilities to introduce entirely plant-based food by academic year 2027/28.
- London Metropolitan University students successfully passed a motion at their Students' Union to go 60% plant-based by the 2024-25 academic year, with a 10% increase each year thereafter until 100%
- In September 2024, the University of Graz became the first non-UK university to see a successful campaign. Not only has a motion been passed in support of 100% plant-based catering, but there is also a fully plant-based canteen and 2 plant-based coffee machines
- University of Birmingham - On 31/03/23, students at The University of Birmingham voted in favour of a motion proposed by Plant-Based Universities campaigners calling for a 60% plant based guild by the next academic year with a 10% annual increase until 100%
- Queen Mary University of London Students’ Union passed a motion for its catering to become fully plant-based by 2029. From 60% in academic year 2024/25, it aims to increase the proportion of its plant-based options in its menus by 10% annually in subsequent years.
- Falmouth University - 05/02/2024 Student Council voted overwhelmingly in support for the university transitioning to 100% plant-based catering on campus
- University College London - In 2023, passed a policy motion that commits Students’ Union catering outlets to transition to 60% plant-based by 2024-25, with 10% increases annually (subject to review) up to 100% by 2028. There is also default oat milk campus-wide since May 2022
- At Lancaster University, the vote to shift to 100% plant-based catering, though supported by 18 of the 19 student delegates, was met with criticism from the Countryside Alliance.
- While University of Warwick students voted in favour of a shift to 100% plant-based catering in November 2023, the Unions’ Board of Trustees eventually revoked the decision in August 2024, explaining that their decision was taken after “careful consideration of the practical and financial challenges”.
- University of Vienna - 2 university canteens are 70% plant-based / 30% vegetarian with a third opening soon!
- University College Roosevelt - Survey filled in by nearly 50% of students and staff showed nearly 70% was in favour of transitioning to 100% plant-based food and drinks at events
- Imperial College London - 4/2/25 Student Union voted to support the transition towards sustainable plant-based menus
- University of Bristol has passed a motion with Student Union support for more plant-based catering and a number of departments have made plant-based commitments (Philosophy department has made a 50% plant-based commitment, Biology department is 100% vegetarian has a commitment to transition to 50% plant-based and the Business School has committed to 100% plant based)
- On the 2 April 2025, the Student Union at Uppsala University voted with a 90% majority to endorse 100% plant-based catering at the institution, making it the first student union in Scandinavia to support the transition to 100% plant-based catering.
- At an all-students assembly in November 2024, the student body at the University of Marburg voted in favour of a transition to 100% plant-based catering at the institution.
- On 18 December 2024, the Students' Parliament at the University of Kaiserlautern-Landau voted in favour of a transition to 100% plant-based catering at the institution, with the share of plant-based foods increasing by 10% each semester.
- In April 2025, through a vote by the legislative body of the University of Basel in Switzerland, students called for the institution to achieve reach 50% plant-based catering by the summer of 2025, 75% by 2027 and 100% by 2030.
- In April 2025, students at the University of Bern won a vote with a 66% majority for the institution to transition to 100% plant-based.
- In May 2025, students at the University of the West of England passed a motion for a transition to 100% plant-based – from 60% plant-based by 2025/26 and a 10% increase annually subject to a financial and social review.
- On 3 June 2025, the students at the University of Freiburg voted with an 80% majority in favour of a transition towards fully plant-based catering on campus.
- On 22 July 2025, the student council at Heidelberg University voted for three different motions calling for plant-based catering at the university, and all three motions were adopted. The first one commits the Student Council to support the long-term goal of providing entirely plant-based meals in the cafeterias and at all events at the university. The second one means the main university canteen will be fully plant-based every Thursday, and the third motion commits the Student Council to remove all animal products from their canteen and vending machines by winter 2025.
- Central European University (Vienna) Student Union supports a transition to 100% plant-based catering
- On 19/02/2026 the University of Southampton Students’ Union passed motion for catering facilities to adopt plant-based by default and for the Students’ Union to lobby for university-wide adoption of plant-based by default
- On 11/02/2025 the Student Council of the University of Bologna voted in favour of transitioning to 100% plant-based university dining, becoming the first university in Italy to make this commitment

== Influence ==
In 2023, more than 800 public figures and academics signed a letter supporting the Plant-Based Universities campaign. Signatories include Dale Vince, Caroline Lucas, George Monbiot, Etienne Scott, Chris Rapley, Chris Packham, and Helen Czerski. Packham said that “The student campaigners of Plant-Based Universities are making incredible changes in their institutions and it’s only right to see hundreds of academics stepping up to support them.” In 2023, the campaign was nominated for an Earthshot Prize, administered by William, Prince of Wales. In 2024, Plant-Based Universities was one of three British charities that received proceeds from that year's tour by musician Moby.

=== Criticism ===
The Countryside Alliance, a lobbying organisation that supports animal farming, has criticised the campaign in 2024, calling the university votes in favor of plant-based catering an "attack on freedom of choice."

== See also ==
- Plant-based action plan
- Veganuary
- Vegan School Meal
- World Vegan Day
