= Neelankarai =

- Neighbourhood
- Nickname: Neelangarai
- Location within Chennai Location within Tamil Nadu Location within India
- Coordinates: 12.9495°N 80.2592°E
- Country: India
- State: Tamil Nadu
- District: Chennai
- Metro: Chennai

Population (2001)
  - Total: 15,688

Languages
  - Official: Tamil
- Time zone: UTC+5:30 (IST)
- Postal code: 600041
- Vehicle registration: TN-14

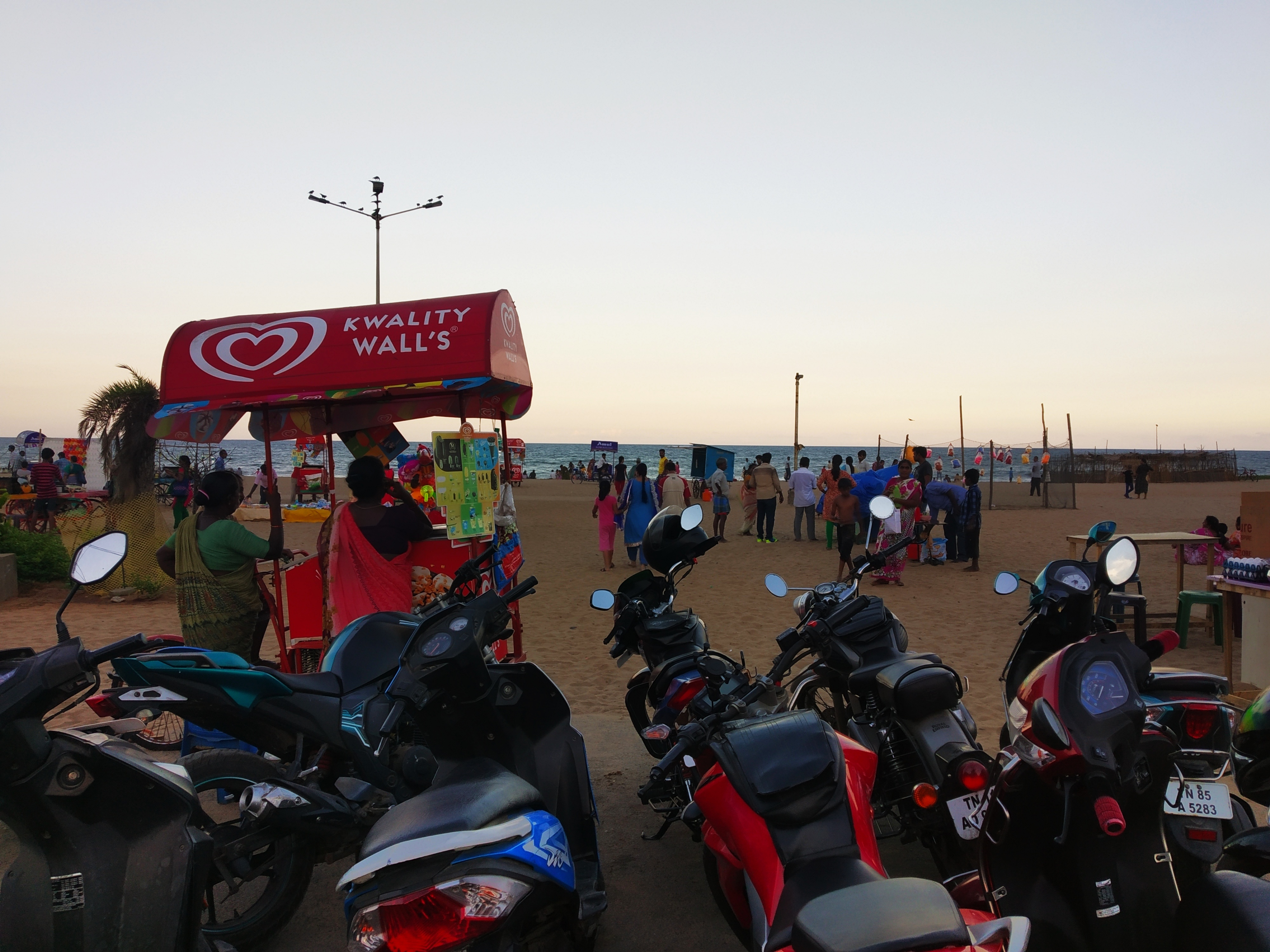
Neelankarai beach

Neelangarai (literally "blue shore") is a census town and is a locality in the south of Chennai. it is situated in Chennai district in the Indian state of Tamil Nadu about seven kilometers south of Adyar, Chennai. The former name of the city was Thiruneelakandapuram, named after the Thiruneelakandeshwarar temple. Neelankarai is located with Palavakkam in the north, Vettuvankeni in the south, Thoraipakkam in the west and the Bay of Bengal in the east. Over the years Neelankarai has developed tremendously and has made a significant name for itself in popularity for various reasons.

== Demography ==
Neelangkarai had a population of 20,000. Males constitute 52% of the population and females 48%. Neelangkarai has an average literacy rate of 70%, higher than the national average of 59.5%: male literacy is 77%, and female literacy is 63%. In Neelangkarai, 11% of the population is under 6 years of age.

Neelangarai comes under South Chennai parliamentary constitution and Sholinganallur legislative constitution (MLA). Neelankarai is located on the East Coast Road (State Highway 49) and is parallel to Thoraipakkam on the OMR (Old Mahabalipuram Road).

== Schools ==
- GTA Vidhya Mandir CBSE School
- Narayana E-Techno School CBSE

== See also ==
- Raja Nagar
