= An Essay on Abstinence from Animal Food, as a Moral Duty =

1802 by Joseph Ritson

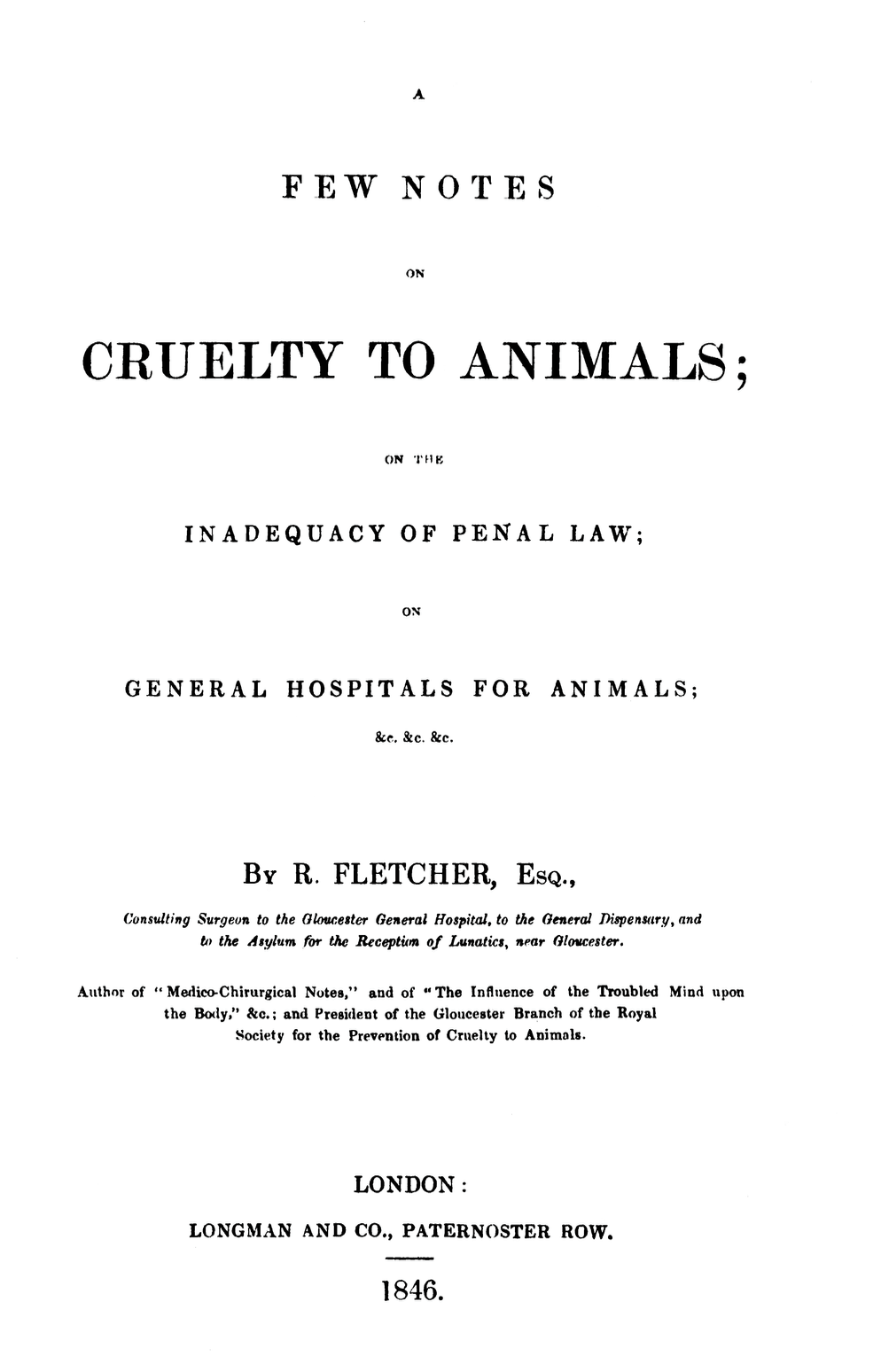
- First edition title page
- Author: Joseph Ritson
- Language: English
- Subject: Ethical vegetarianism, animal rights
- Genre: Essay
- Publisher: Richard Phillips
- Publication date: 1802
- Publication place: United Kingdom of Great Britain and Ireland
- Media type: Print
- Pages: 236
- OCLC: 2110842
- Text: An Essay on Abstinence from Animal Food, as a Moral Duty at the Internet Archive

An Essay on Abstinence from Animal Food, as a Moral Duty is an 1802 book by English antiquarian and writer Joseph Ritson. It advocates for ethical vegetarianism and animal rights. Drawing on moral, physiological, and philosophical arguments, the work contends that the consumption of animal food is unnatural, unnecessary, and ethically indefensible. It is among the earliest publications to present vegetarianism as a moral obligation rather than solely a matter of health or religious doctrine. The book was influential in the development of the modern vegetarian movement and shaped the views of later figures such as Percy Bysshe Shelley.

== Background ==
Joseph Ritson adopted a vegetarian diet in 1772 at the age of 19, influenced by Bernard Mandeville's The Fable of the Bees. He followed a diet of milk and vegetables. He claimed that for thirty years he had not eaten fish, flesh or fowl, though he continued to eat eggs, reasoning that doing so did not take animal life. Ritson also advocated for animal welfare and regarded vegetarianism as a moral obligation. He spent several years gathering material for the book.

== Contents ==
Ritson argued that consuming animal food was cruel, unnecessary, and akin to a form of refined cannibalism. He believed that humanity's only path to true happiness was through cultivating the virtues of benevolence, justice, and compassion, which he saw as incompatible with meat-eating. He also maintained that an animal-based diet was physiologically unnatural for humans and contributed to disease and suffering.

The book is among the earliest to argue for vegetarianism primarily on ethical grounds. Although earlier writers such as Thomas Tryon and George Cheyne had promoted vegetarian diets, Ritson framed abstinence from meat as a moral imperative. He contended that meat-eating negatively affected human character, fostering aggression. He also denounced contemporary English blood sports, which he linked to the moral decline associated with meat consumption:

The barbarous and unfeeling sports (as they are called) of the English – their horse-racing, hunting, shooting, bull and bear baiting, cock-fighting, prize-fighting, and the like, all proceed from their immoderate addiction to animal food. Their natural temper is thereby corrupted, and they are in the habitual and hourly commission of crimes against nature, justice, and humanity, from which a feeling and reflective mind, unaccustomed to such a diet, would revolt, but in which they profess to take delight.

Ritson, an atheist, did not rely on religious arguments. He rejected creationism and, like James Burnett, Lord Monboddo, believed that humans were related to monkeys. He attempted to dismantle the perceived boundary between humans and animals, arguing that humans resembled herbivorous animals and that language was no more intrinsic to humans than to parrots or monkeys.

== Reception ==
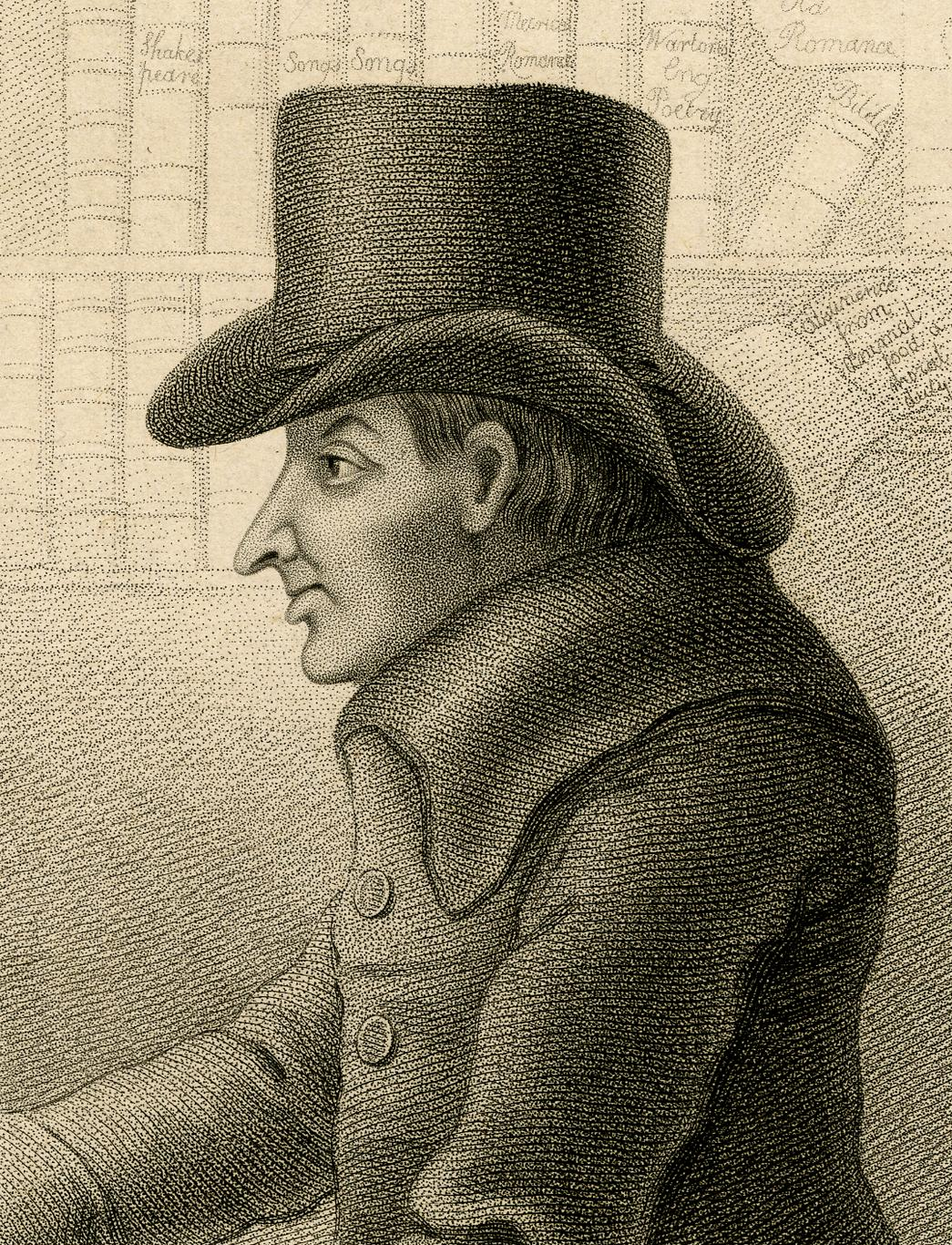
Engraving of Ritson by James Sayers

=== Influence ===
Ritson's book had a lasting influence on the vegetarian movement. Several of his core arguments—such as the sufficiency of plant-based nutrition, the health benefits of vegetarianism, and the ethical concerns around animal slaughter—were later reiterated in vegetarian literature.

The book significantly influenced Percy Bysshe Shelley, who adopted and developed many of Ritson's arguments in his own vegetarian writings. In 1939, scholar David Lee Clark identified numerous phrasal similarities between Ritson's book and Shelley's A Vindication of Natural Diet (1813), arguing that the resemblance was unlikely to be coincidental.

=== Criticism ===
Historian Colin Spencer observed that Ritson's advocacy of moral vegetarianism was unpopular during his lifetime and perceived by many as radical and dangerous.

Henry Brougham and Sydney Smith criticised the book in a lengthy 1803 review for The Edinburgh Review. They highlighted what they saw as inconsistencies in Ritson's ethics, questioning his consumption of milk and eggs: "Is not the consumption of milk the starving of calves? and is not the devouring of eggs, the causing of acute misery to a tender mother, and the procuring of abortions?" They also mocked Ritson's reliance on animal-derived materials, such as goose quills, insect-based ink, and whale-tallow candles.

A reviewer for The Monthly Review in 1803 made similar points, arguing that milk, which Ritson recommended, was itself an animal product and unjust to calves, asses and goats. Additional negative reviews appeared in The British Critic and The Critical Review.

In 1896, the Dictionary of National Biography described the book as showing "marks of incipient insanity". Biographer Bertrand Harris Bronson remarked that much of the book's content relied on dubious or anecdotal sources:

The unsupported assertions of voyagers all over the world, unsubstantiated opinions of quacks and cranks for the preceding two hundred and fifty years, newspaper stories of old men and women who had lived to incredible ages on a vegetable diet, and of young maidens who lived upon air: everything was grist to Ritson's vegetarian mill and apparently accepted as gospel truth.

Carol J. Adams has challenged such characterisations, arguing that Ritson's work was misjudged because of prevailing cultural attitudes toward meat. She noted that his final book, The Life of King Arthur from Ancient Historians and Authentic Documents (1825), was received as a serious work of scholarship, questioning why his previous book should be considered evidence of instability.

== Publication history ==
The book was rejected by several publishers before being accepted by Sir Richard Phillips, a fellow vegetarian, who issued it in 1802.

== See also ==
- The Cry of Nature; or, An Appeal to Mercy and to Justice, on Behalf of the Persecuted Animals (1791)
- Reasons for not Eating Animal Food (1815)
- Fruits and Farinacea (1845)
