= Plant-based action plan =

Government plans

Plant-based action plans are government climate change mitigation strategies that promote plant-based food development, production and consumption. The best known is the international Plant Based Treaty. Some countries have developed their own plans, or announced intentions to develop plans, including Denmark and South Korea, as have cities including New York City.

== Plant Based Treaty ==
Launched in 2021 at COP26 in Glasgow, the Plant Based Treaty is an international treaty that has been signed by cities around the world that has the aim of reducing greenhouse gas emissions from animal agriculture. It encourages carbon labeling on menus and transitioning to plant-based menus at public institutions. It is modelled on the Fossil Fuel Non-Proliferation Treaty.

The treaty calls for:

- an end to the expansion of animal agriculture;
- the promotion of a shift to sustainable plant-based diets;
- and an effort to "reforest and rewild" planet Earth.

Los Angeles became the 20th city to endorse the treaty when the Los Angeles City Council voted to support it in October 2022. In 2023, Edinburgh was the first European capital city to sign the treaty. In January 2024, Exmouth became the fifth UK council to endorse the treaty. Amsterdam became the 26th municipal council to endorse the treaty.

The Plant Based Treaty released its Safe and Just report at the COP28 climate talks in Dubai. The Plant Based Treaty advocates did not have access to the negotiating sessions during COP28. Instead they held a rally in support of the treaty. "The emissions from the food system alone will put the 1.5 and 2C climate target out of reach," Plant Based Treaty science ambassador Steven George said at COP28.

== Denmark ==
Denmark’s Action Plan for Plant-Based Foods [Danish: Handlingsplan for plantebaserede fødevarer] was launched on 13 October 2023 to pave the way for a development of the plant-based sector in Denmark, with measures to transition production as well as consumption. The action plan was motivated by various reasons, including climate change, biodiversity loss, food resources, and public health. It follows a political agreement in Denmark from 2021. The plan includes stimulation domestic consumption (e.g. training of public and private kitchen chefs on preparing plant-based meals, nudging interventions, retail campaigns, etc.), export initiatives, stimulating production at farm level, as well as research and development, while also strengthening collaboration on plant-based foods throughout the food system.

The plan is accompanied by a Plant-Based Food Grant, which originally was worth 675 mil. DKK (90 mil. EUR), but later with additional funding has grown to 812 mil. DKK (109 mil. EUR). This grant also supports initiatives across the food system, from farm to fork.

== South Korea ==
The South Korean action plan was announced in 2023 and includes the promotion of plant-based exports, as well as R&D support with the installation of an alternative food research support centre.

== New York City ==
The New York City action plan includes many elements. In 2023, all the NYC Health + Hospitals were serving plant-based meals as the primary dinner option. The plan includes the Eat A Whole Lot More Plants health promotion campaign. The New York City Public Schools serve plant-based meals on Fridays, and older adult centers, homeless shelters, and jails serve plant-based meals once each week.

== See also ==
- Meat-free Days
- Meatless Monday
- Plant-Based Universities
- Veganuary
- World Vegan Day
- Vegan school meal
