= Suzy Amis Cameron =

American environmental advocate, actress, and model

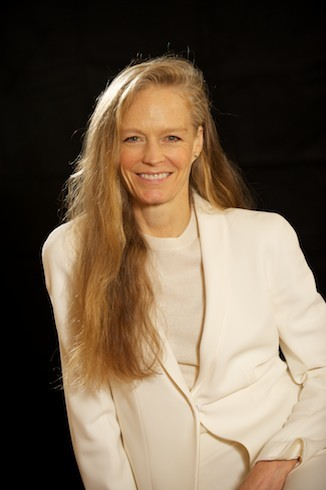
- Amis in 2017
- Born: January 5, 1962 (age 64); Oklahoma City, Oklahoma, U.S.
- Other name: Suzy Cameron
- Occupations: Actress; model; author; plant-based diet activist; environmental activist
- Years active: 1984–1999, 2014
- Spouses: Sam Robards (m. 1986; div. 1994) James Cameron (m. 2000)
- Children: 4

Suzy Amis Cameron (born January 5, 1962) is an American former actress, author, and activist.

== Early life and career ==
Born in Oklahoma City, Oklahoma, on January 5, 1962, Amis Cameron worked as a Ford model before she began acting in the 1980s. She is best known for her role as Rose's granddaughter Lizzy in Titanic, and also appeared in films such as Fandango, The Usual Suspects, and The Ballad of Little Jo.

== Muse Global Schools ==
In 2006, Amis Cameron co-founded Muse Global Schools, a Reggio-inspired, independent, nonprofit school in the Calabasas, California, area north of Los Angeles, with her sister, Rebecca Amis. An exclusively plant-based diet was adopted in the fall of 2015, and it is the country's first plant-based K-12 school with a 100% plant-based lunch program. Additionally, the school is zero waste and 100% solar powered, with Solar Sun Flowers designed by her husband, James Cameron.

== Environmental and plant-based activism ==
In 2009, Amis Cameron founded Red Carpet Green Dress, a global initiative showcasing sustainable fashion on the red carpet at the Oscars. Collaborating with fashion brands such as Armani, Vivienne Westwood, and Reformation, the gowns and tuxedos have included vintage, recycled, repurposed and eco design. Previous campaign ambassadors include Emma Roberts, Priyanka Bose, Naomie Harris, Olga Kurylenko, Kellan Lutz, Sophie Turner, and Missi Pyle.

In 2012, Amis and Cameron became vegan after watching the 2011 film Forks Over Knives.

In 2014, Amis Cameron co-founded, with her husband, director James Cameron, and Craig McCaw, Plant Power Task Force, an organization focused on showing the impact of animal agriculture on climate change and the environment. Plant Power Task Force supported the first multi-country studies on global diets and climate change by the independent U.K.-based think tank, Chatham House: Livestock—Climate Change's Forgotten Sector and Changing Diets, Changing Climate. They also spearheaded the MyPlate MyPlanet initiative in spring 2015, a platform for hundreds of environmental and health organizations in support of linking health and the environment in the U.S. Dietary Guidelines.

She also is a founder of Cameron Family Farms and Food Forest Organics, a plant-based café and market in New Zealand. Her farm in New Zealand supports regenerative agriculture using 500-600 cattle livestock to improve the soil and help carbon sequestration. In an interview with NZ media the Cameron couple assured the audience that this was merely a pathway for other NZ farmers in their eventual transition, for the planet, to plant based agriculture, without livestock. A plant-based diet is, she explained, a healthier choice, despite their use of cattle on their land. A shortage of foreign labour during lockdown was another reason for keeping on the cattle, instead of making the transition to plant based agriculture as she and James Cameron had planned.

=== Book ===
In fall 2018, Amis Cameron published the plant-based cookbook, OMD: Swap One Meal a Day to Get Healthy, Live Longer, and Save the Planet, with Simon & Schuster's Atria Publishing Group; in 2019, the paperback edition, The OMD Plan: Swap One Meal a Day to Save Your Health and Save the Planet, was published. The OMD Plan was featured on Oprah Winfrey's Super Soul Sunday in Fall 2019. The book inspired Oprah Winfrey to eat one plant-based meal a day.

== Personal life ==
In 1986, she married actor Sam Robards, the son of Lauren Bacall and Jason Robards. Amis and Robards co-starred in the 1985 film Fandango. They had a son, Jasper, before their divorce in 1994.

Amis and James Cameron met and had an affair while filming Titanic, but they did not marry at that time. Cameron was married to Linda Hamilton in 1997, and divorced two years later. Amis and Cameron subsequently married in 2000, and have three children. In 2020, they became the permanent guardians for one of their daughter's teenage friends.

Amis, Cameron, and their family live in New Zealand, with a farm in the Wairarapa and a home in Wellington.

== Filmography ==
Year	Title	Role	Notes
1984	Miami Vice	Penny McGraw	Episode: "Heart of Darkness"
1985	Fandango	Debbie	
1987	The Big Town	Aggie Donaldson	
1988	Plain Clothes	Robin Torrence	
1988	Rocket Gibraltar	Aggie Rockwell	
1989	Twister	Maureen Cleveland	
1990	Where the Heart Is	Chloe McBain	
1993	Rich in Love	Rae Odom	
1993	Watch It	Anne	
1993	The Ballad of Little Jo	Josephine "Jo" Monaghan	Alternative title: Little Man Jo; Nominated—Independent Spirit Award for Best Female Lead
1993	Two Small Bodies	Eileen Mahoney	
1994	Blown Away	Kate Dove	
1994	Nadja	Cassandra	
1995	The Usual Suspects	Edie Finneran	National Board of Review Award for Best Cast
1996	Cadillac Ranch	C.J. Crowley	
1996	One Good Turn	Laura Forrest	
1997	The Ex	Molly Kenyon	
1997	Titanic	Lizzy Calvert	Nominated—Screen Actors Guild Award for Outstanding Performance by a Cast in a Motion Picture
1997	The Beneficiary	Connie Roos	Television movie
1997	Last Stand at Saber River	Martha Cable	Television movie
1997	Dead by Midnight	Lisa Larkin / Dr. Sarah Flint	Television movie
1998	Firestorm	Jennifer	
1999	Judgment Day	FBI Agent Jeanine Tyrell	Direct-to-video release
2014	Deepsea Challenge 3D	Herself	Documentary
