= Hanging Sword Alley =

Alley in the City of London

Coordinates: 51.5139°N 0.107°W

A watercolour of the alley, painted by James Lawson Stewart around 1890

The alley was recorded on John Rocque's Map of London, 1746 and is marked here in red.

Hanging Sword Alley is an alley in the Alsatia district of London, running between Whitefriars Street and Salisbury Square, close to Fleet Street.

== History ==
The alley was first known as Ouldwood Alley in the 16th century, when it was in the manor of the Bishop of Salisbury, who owned twenty-four tenements there. It was then named after the sign of a fencing school recorded in 1564, and tuition in this martial art remained in the area until the 17th century.

Walter Bell described the alley as it was at the start of the twentieth century,

Though swept clean, and paved and lighted, Hanging Sword Alley, when you walk its length, gives a fair idea of what the rookeries of Alsatia must have been like. There is scarcely room for two to walk abreast. The exit is by precipitous steps; and the entrance is masked by Crown Court. A line of houses at the south end, with back doors on the alley, open upon Whitefriars Street. The double means of escape well served the purpose of the thieves and rogues who infested the place when pressed in pursuit. There are other steep steps up to Magpie Alley, and the whole neighbourhood of Whitefriars goes up and down in curious fashion, intersected by winding courts like George Yard and Primrose Hill.

== Blood Bowl House ==
"The Idle 'Prentice betrayed and taken in a Night-Cellar with his Accomplice". William Hogarth depicted Blood Bowl House in Industry and Idleness.

In the 18th century, the street became known as Blood Bowl Alley after a night-cellar which was an infamous drinking den.

In 1743, George Morgan encountered a lady in Ludgate Hill and offered to escort her home. The lady, Mary Stansbury, took him to a house in the alley. After some pleasantries and exchange of money, they undressed and went to bed but she then left him to be robbed by a man with a club. Morgan defended himself with his cane and summoned the constable. The Stansburys were tried for assault and the theft of his property: a pair of silver knee-buckles; a pair of silver shoe-buckles; a cambric stock; a bath metal stock-buckle; a silk handkerchief; a hat; a periwig; five moidores; half a guinea and three shillings. Mary Stansbury was sentenced to death for the crime but was reprieved and transported instead.

William Hogarth's 1747 engraving Industry and Idleness portrayed an idle apprentice in Hanging Sword Alley being betrayed by a prostitute who informs of his intent to murder. Dr. Trusler suggested that this was set in Chick Lane but Nichols "was assured that the situation of the night-cellar exhibited in this plate, was in 'Blood Bowl Alley, down by the fishmonger's, near Water-Lane in Fleet-Street'".

== Notable residents ==
Samuel Richardson, author of Pamela, lived close by in Salisbury Court in the 18th century, and ran his printing business from two buildings in the alley. In the 19th century, it appears in Dickens' A Tale of Two Cities as the home of Jerry Cruncher – a porter who moonlighted as a resurrection man, and in his Bleak House, Chapter 27, "More Old Soldiers Than One".

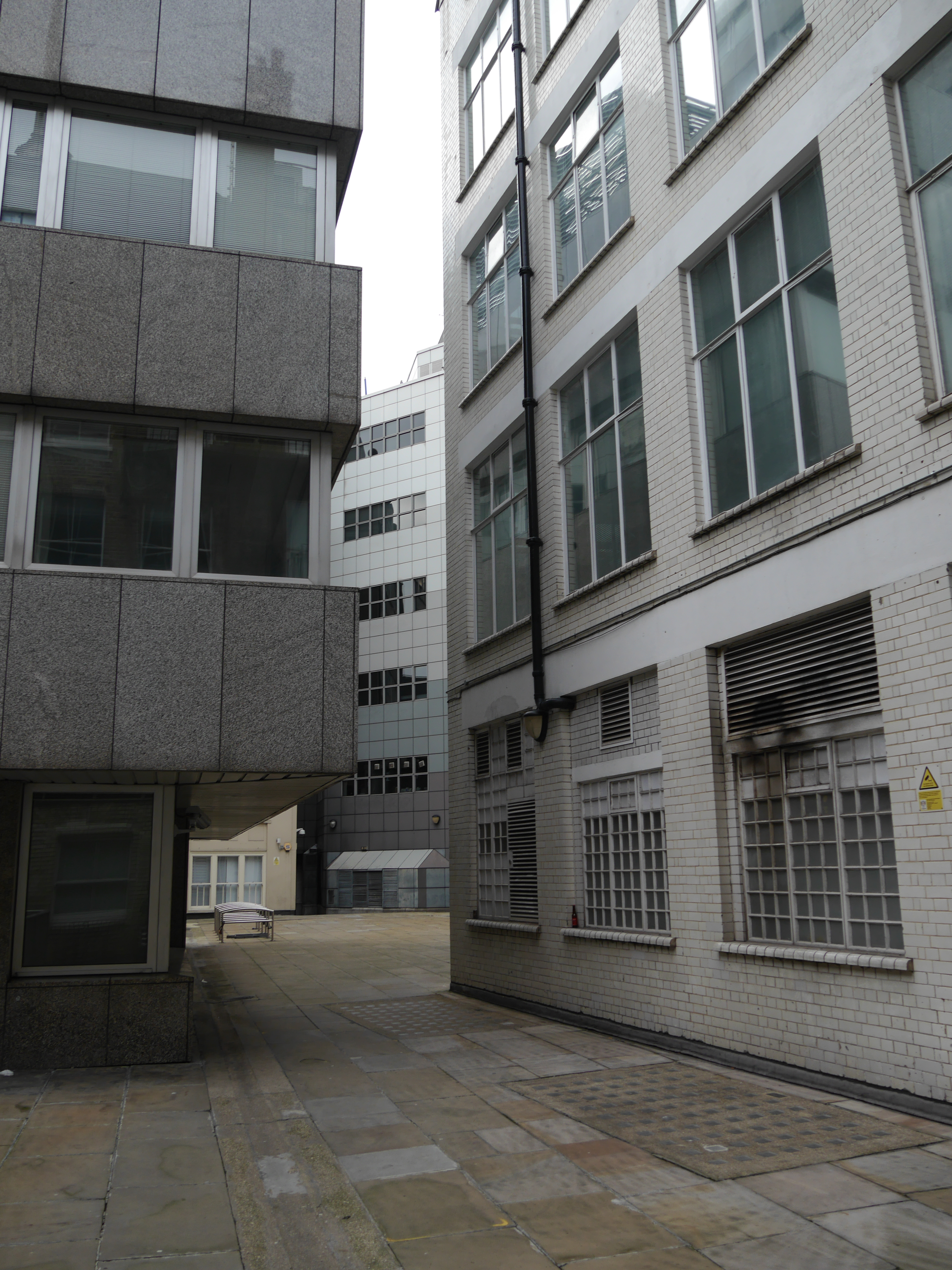
Hanging Sword Alley in 2018 before demolitions for construction of City of London Law Courts
