= Diego Saglia =

Italian academic

Diego Saglia is a Professor of English Literature at the University of Parma. He received his PhD from Cardiff University (UK) and, before joining Parma, taught at Cardiff University and the University of Bath (UK). He is a member of the advisory committee of the “Museo Byron a Palazzo Guiccioli” (Ravenna, Italy), the coordinator of the Parma Unit of the Centro Interuniversitario per lo Studio del Romanticismo (Interuniversity Centre for the Study of Romanticism – CISR), and a member of the steering committees of Anglo-Hispanic Horizons, 1780s-1840s and European Romanticisms in Association. In October 2022 he was appointed to the Board of Parma's Teatro Regio

== Research ==
His research focuses on the literature and culture of the Romantic period, in particular on exoticism and orientalism, Gothic, national identity and gender; as well as on drama and theatre, and several central figures of the period including Jane Austen, Lord Byron, Robert Southey, Felicia Hemans, and Walter Scott. His research also explores the international and transcultural relations between Britain and other European traditions at the turn of the nineteenth century. In particular, Saglia has contributed to the investigation of Anglo-Hispanic relations in the Romantic age with his ongoing investigation of constructions of the image of Romantic Spain in British Romanticism, as well as textual and broader cultural exchanges between Britain and Spain from the 1780s to the 1830s. His monograph Poetic Castles in Spain: British Romanticism and Figurations of Iberia (2000) is often quoted as a crucial point of reference in this area of study.

His essays have appeared in Studies in Romanticism, La questione romantica, The Keats-Shelley Journal, Romanticism, Nineteenth-Century Contexts, Textus, English Literary History, Textual Practice, Studies in the Novel, Gothic Studies, Genre, Studies in English Literature and other international journals.

Saglia’s edited book Byron e il segno plurale: tracce del sé, percorsi di scrittura (2011) was awarded the Elma Dangerfield Award of the International Byron Society in 2012; and his co-edited volume Byron and Italy (with Alan Rawes, 2017) was awarded the 2018 Elma Dangerfield Award of the International Byron Society.

His monograph European Literatures in Britain 1815-1832: Romantic Translations (CUP, 2018) has been reviewed by The BARS Review as a "fine study [...] highly recommended to all who research and teach Romantic-period literature. As the Continent of the present feels increasingly isolated, he encourages us to open up our Romantic readings to the Continent of the past."

From January 2017 to December 2023, Saglia was Head of the Department of Humanities, Social Sciences and Cultural Industries (Dipartimento di Discipline Umanistiche, Sociali e delle Imprese Culturali) of the Università di Parma and a member of the University Senate. Since November 2023 he has been Rectoral Delegate for Cultural Institutions.

== Publications ==
=== Books written ===
- Saglia, Diego. Byron and Spain: Itinerary in the Writing of Place. Lewiston, NY: Edwin Mellen Press, 1996. ISBN 978-0-7734-4189-7
- Saglia, Diego. I discorsi dell'esotico: L'oriente nel romanticismo britannico, 1780-1830. Napoli: Liguori, 2002. ISBN 978-88-207-3452-7
- Saglia, Diego. Leggere Austen. Roma: Carocci, 2016. ISBN 978-88-430-7931-5
- Saglia, Diego. European Literatures in Britain, 1815-1832: Romantic Translations. Cambridge University Press, 2019 ISBN 978-1-108-66990-0
- Saglia, Diego. Modernità del Romanticismo: Scrittura e cambiamento nella letteratura britannica, 1780-1830 . Marsilio, 2023 ISBN 978-88-297-1711-8
- Saglia, Diego, I mondi di Jane Austen. Roma: Carocci, 2024 ISBN 978-88-290-2647-0

=== Edited ===
- Saglia, Diego and Giovanna Silvani. (editors) Narrare/Rappresentare: Incroci di segni fra immagine e parola. Bologna: CLUEB, 2003. ISBN 88-491-2128-8
- Saglia, Diego and Giovanna Silvani. (editors) Il teatro della paura: Scenari gotici del romanticismo europeo. Roma: Bulzoni, 2005 ISBN 978-88-7870-057-4
- Battaglia, Beatrice and Diego Saglia. (editors) Re-drawing Austen: Picturesque Travels in Austenland. Napoli: Liguori, 2004. ISBN 978-88-207-3727-6
- Bandiera, Laura and Diego Saglia. (editors) De claris mulieribus: Figure e storie femminili nella tradizione europea : Scritti in onore di Giovanna Silvani. Parma: Monte Università Parma, 2011 ISBN 978-88-7847-369-0
- Fischer, Carolin, Diego Saglia and Brunhilde Wehinger. (editors) Konzepte der Rezeption. Band 1: Réception productive: imitatio, intertextualité, intermédialité; Produktive Rezeption: Imitatio, intertextualität, intermedialität; Ricezione produttiva: imitatio, intertestualità, intermedialità. Tübingen: Stauffenburg Verlag, 2015 ISBN 978-3-86057-223-8
- Saglia, Diego and Ian Haywood. (editors) Spain in British Romanticism: 1800-1840. Palgrave Macmillan, 2018. ISBN 978-3-319-64456-1
- Rawes, Alan and Diego Saglia. (editors) Byron and Italy. Manchester: Manchester University Press, 2018. ISBN 978-1-5261-2607-8
- Accardo, Aldo and Diego Saglia. (editors) Le isole di fantasia. Un viaggio immaginario di Lord Byron in Corsica e Sardegna. Roma: Donzelli, 2018. ISBN 978-88-6843-730-5
- Byron, George G. Manfred, a cura di Diego Saglia, con testo a fronte. Venezia: Marsilio, 2019. ISBN 978-88-297-0071-4
- Gamer, Michael and Diego Saglia. (editors) A Cultural History of Tragedy in the Age of Empire (A Cultural History of Tragedy, v. 5) New York: Bloomsbury Academic, 2020. ISBN 978-1-4742-8807-1
- Dowling, Gregory and Diego Saglia. (editors) Byron in Italia. Bologna: Minerva, 2020. ISBN 978-88-332-4323-8
- Dowling, Gregory and Diego Saglia. (editors) Byron e Dante. Bologna: Minerva, 2021. ISBN 978-88-332-4444-0
