= Monthly Magazine =

British publication (1796–1843)

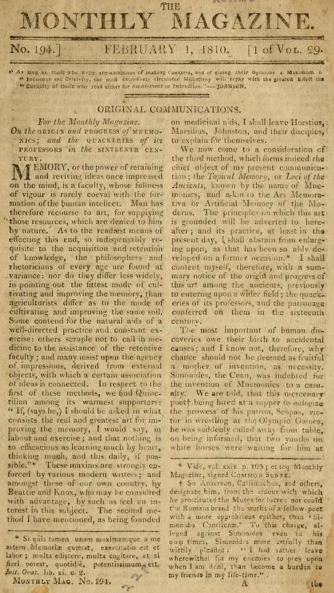
Monthly Magazine, 1810 (John Adams Library, Boston Public Library)

The Monthly Magazine (1796–1843) of London began publication in February 1796 as The Monthly Magazine and British Register. From 1826 to 1835 it used the title The Monthly Magazine, or British Register of Literature, Sciences, and Belles Lettres. It continued from 1835 to 1838 as The Monthly Magazine of Politics, Literature, and the Belles Lettres, then from 1839 to 1843 as The Monthly Magazine.

== Contributors ==
Richard Phillips was the publisher and a contributor on political issues. The editor for the first ten years was a literary jack-of-all-trades, Dr John Aikin. Other contributors included William Blake, Samuel Taylor Coleridge, George Dyer, Henry Neele, Charles Lamb, and James Hogg. The magazine also published the earliest fiction by Charles Dickens, the first of what would become Sketches by Boz.

The circulation of the magazine in early 1830s was about 600. From 1839 the magazine was for two years edited by Francis Foster Barham and John Abraham Heraud. Its content in that period has been described by a recent American analyst as "popularizations of post-Kantian philosophy, esoteric mystical commentary, literary effusions, and idealistic calls for child-centered education and communitarian socialism."

== See also ==
- The New Monthly Magazine
