= MUSE School =

MUSE Global Schools
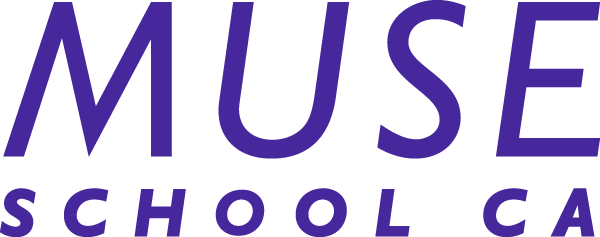

Location
- 1220 Second St; Santa Monica, California 90401; United States
- 34°5′37″N 118°42′14″W

Information
- Type: Private school
- Established: 2006
- Founders: Suzy Amis Cameron; Rebecca Amis
- NCES School ID: A0990016
- Head of school: Tressa Wyner
- Teaching staff: 28.0 (on an FTE basis)
- Grades: PK–12
- Gender: Co-educational
- Enrollment: 178 (2017-2018)
- Student to teacher ratio: 6.4
- Campuses: 2
- Website: museglobalschoolca.com

MUSE Global Schools is a PK–12 co-educational private school in Santa Monica, United States. It was co-founded by Suzy Amis Cameron and her sister Rebecca Amis in 2006. It operates in Santa Monica and has been described as the first vegan K–12 school in the country.

== History ==
MUSE Global School was co-founded by Suzy Amis Cameron and her sister Rebecca Amis in 2006. The motivation for starting the school is the founders' and their children's lack of satisfaction with the quality of education on offer with particular reference to the environment, in their children's context, and the desire to raise children for whom environmentalism is a way of life. The school was described as a "utopia", where children learn to respect nature, and be happy about diversity. The school built its own grade-level goals to align with the California state standards and centers its education philosophy on academics, passion-based learning, sustainability, communication and self-efficacy. Students and educators work together to build a personalized curriculum based on students' interests and passions. In September, 2019 the school had 205 students from kindergarten to 12th grade.

== Seed-to-Table program and transition to a completely plant-based menu ==
The school has been described as the first vegan K–12 school in the country. At the school, students and staff grow fruits and vegetables that are included in its vegan school meals, under a program called Seed-to-Table. Students in each grade learn how to cultivate and pick fruits and vegetables, and to prepare meals from them. Around 200 various plants are grown under the program and the school served entirely plant-based meals one day a week from September 2013. This increased to two days a week in the fall of 2014, plus two days of vegetarian-friendly fare. An exclusively plant-based diet was adopted in the fall of 2015.

== Facilities ==
The school operates from two campuses nestled in Malibu Canyon. In May 2015, five solar panel towers, each generating 300 kWh, designed in the shape of sunflowers by James Cameron, were installed on the premises. These provide 75 to 100 percent of the schools electricity requirement, depending upon incident solar radiation and demand.

== Controversy ==
In 2014, a National Labor Relations Board ruling criticised the school's employer confidentiality policy and declared it illegal.
