= Veganuary =

UK nonprofit promoting veganism

- Pronunciation: /ˈviːɡən.juɛri/, /viːˈɡæn.jʊəri/
- Formation: 2014
- Registration no.: 1168566
- Legal status: Charity
- Purpose: Advocacy
- Headquarters: PO Box 771 York, YO1 0LJ, United Kingdom
- Website: veganuary.com

Veganuary is an annual challenge run by a British nonprofit organisation that promotes the vegan lifestyle by encouraging people to follow a vegan diet for the month of January. Since it began in 2014 with only 3,325 people who joined to the challenge, participation has increased each year. 400,000 people signed up to the 2020 campaign. The campaign estimated this represented the carbon dioxide equivalent of 450,000 flights and the lives of more than a million animals. Veganuary can also refer to the event itself. In 2026, 30 million people took part in it.

== History ==
Founded by Jane Land and Matthew Glover, the first event was during January 2014. In 2015 the project registered 12,800 sign-ups. From there the sign-ups grew to over 500,000 in 2021.

The name "Veganuary" is a portmanteau of "vegan" and "January". The first part of the compound is pronounced either /ˈviːɡən-/ or /viːˈɡæn-/, whereas the -uary part is subject to the same kind of variation as in the case of the word "January" itself, thus /ˈviːɡən.juɛri/, /viːˈɡæn.jʊəri/, etc.

In 2023 It'll Never Catch On: The Veganuary Story, a documentary about the event, featured the vegans Kellie Bright, Jane Fallon, Jasmine Harman, Evanna Lynch, Chris Packham and Benjamin Zephaniah and the vegan chefs Henry Firth and Ian Threasby. It debuted at the November 2023 Plant Based World Expo.

== Programme ==
Veganuary is a crowd-funded campaign to issue a challenge each January promoting eating vegan for the month.

Participants sign up online and receive a downloadable "starter kit" and daily support emails. They are offered an online "vegan starter kit" with restaurant guides, product directories and a recipe database. Participants are encouraged to share images and recipes to social media, which according to the academic Alexa Weik von Mossner creates a sense of community and communicates the message that veganism is easy and fun.

== Reception ==
GQ magazine noted "it's a clever way to introduce a new way of nutritional thinking at a time of year where our mind is hardwired to explore ways to better ourselves".

A January 2019 slump in UK pub receipts was blamed on Veganuary.

Von Mossner notes that criticism can be raised over the fact that Veganuary uses "images with happy-looking, baby-faced animals while at the same time downplaying (though not completely omitting) the horrific truth about the lives and deaths of the actual animals that are nevertheless slaughtered everyday for human consumption". Another point of criticism may be "the campaign's strict emphasis on food rather than on other aspects of the vegan lifestyle and worldview".

The vegan activist Tobias Leenaert postulated the popularity of the campaign may be partially due to the organisers' decision to promote "trying" veganism for a specific period vs. "going vegan", which allows participants to decide not to continue with an all-vegan diet without feeling as if they have failed. Von Mossner agrees and points to the "light-hearted" and generally positive tone of the promotional materials, which feature attractive and "frequently named animals" with captions like, "Save little Eric—Try Vegan this January" rather than images of animal abuse.

== Impact ==
Food businesses and restaurants in the UK have been introducing new vegan products in January to coincide with Veganuary. The supermarkets in the UK, including Tesco, have been seen to run advertisements advertising Veganuary.

People in the United States are now participants in the challenge. In 2019 The Washington Post reported that "46 percent of people signed up for health reasons, with 34 percent citing animal cruelty and only 12 percent climate issues." In 2020, the Houston Chronicle reported that "Texas was the state with the second-highest sign-ups in the U.S." In 2021 The Maine Sunday Telegram reported that "Annual participation continues to be biggest in Britain, but it's slowly spreading to the U.S., along with many other countries including Mexico, Argentina, Germany and Sweden."

In 2022 Veganuary published a deck of 40 inspirational cards called The Vegan Kit.

As of 2024 Veganuary ambassadors include the singers Billie Eilish and Paul McCartney and the actor Joaquin Phoenix. 2024 was the first year Veganuary launched their campaign in Spain. In 2024 Veganuary had the support of the Dani Rovira, Clara Lago, Elisabeth Larena, Núria Gago, Nathalie Poza and David Pareja. Avery Yale Kamila reported that "more than 1.8 million people participated" in 2024, which was when "Emirates airline introduced 300 new vegan in-flight meals, while Dunkin' shops in the United Kingdom added vegan doughnuts in several flavors." The Guardian reported at the end of 2024 on studies that have found that meat-eaters who participate in Veganuary are more likely to find meat disgusting and less likely to identify as a meat-eater after participating in Veganuary.

== Participants ==
Participation in Veganuary has become increasingly popular, with the number of people signing up rising each year:

- 2014 – 3,300 people
- 2015 – 12,800 people
- 2016 – 23,000 people
- 2017 – 50,000 people
- 2018 – 168,000 people
- 2019 – 250,000 people
- 2020 – 400,000 people
- 2021 – 582,538 people
- 2022 – 629,000 people
- 2023 – 706,965 people
- 2024 – More than 1,800,000 people
- 2025 – Approximately 25.8 million people
- 2026 - Approximately 30 million people

== Measurement Methodology ==
In 2024 and prior years, Veganuary reported participation numbers based on official registrations through their website. Beginning in 2025, the organization shifted to a survey-based measurement approach, commissioning nationally representative polls across 11 core campaign countries (the UK, Germany, Italy, Spain, France, Austria, Switzerland, Chile, Canada, Brazil, and the US). This change reflects a broader understanding that official sign-ups do not capture all participants, as many people practice veganism during January without formally registering. Consequently, the apparent increase from 1.8 million (2024) to 25.8 million (2025) reflects methodological change rather than a proportional real-world increase in participation.

== Objective ==
The company's plans state that one of the goals is to reach minimum 33 million members each year by 2027.

== See also ==
- List of food days
- List of vegan restaurants
- List of vegetarian festivals
- Meat-free days
- Meatless Monday
- Plant-based action plan
- Plant-Based Universities
- Vegan school meal
- Vegan veto vote
- World Vegan Day
- World Vegetarian Day
- Dry January
- Effective altruism
- Veganism
- Ed Winters
- Melanie Joy
