= Palavakkam =

- Neighbourhood
- Location within Chennai
- Coordinates: 12.9535°N 80.2572°E
- Country: India
- State: Tamil Nadu
- District: Chennai
- Metro: Chennai

Population (2001)
  - Total: 14,369

Languages
  - Official: Tamil
- Time zone: UTC+5:30 (IST)
- PIN: 600041
- Telephone code: 91-44

Palavakam is a locality in the south of Chennai and census town in Chennai district in the Indian state of Tamil Nadu. It is located on the East Coast Road about 6 km south of Adyar.

== Demographics ==
As of 2001 India census, Palavakam had a population of 14,369. Males constitute 51% of the population and females 49%. Palavakam has an average literacy rate of 74%, higher than the national average of 59.5%: male literacy is 78%, and female literacy is 68%. In Palavakam, 12% of the population is under 6 years of age.

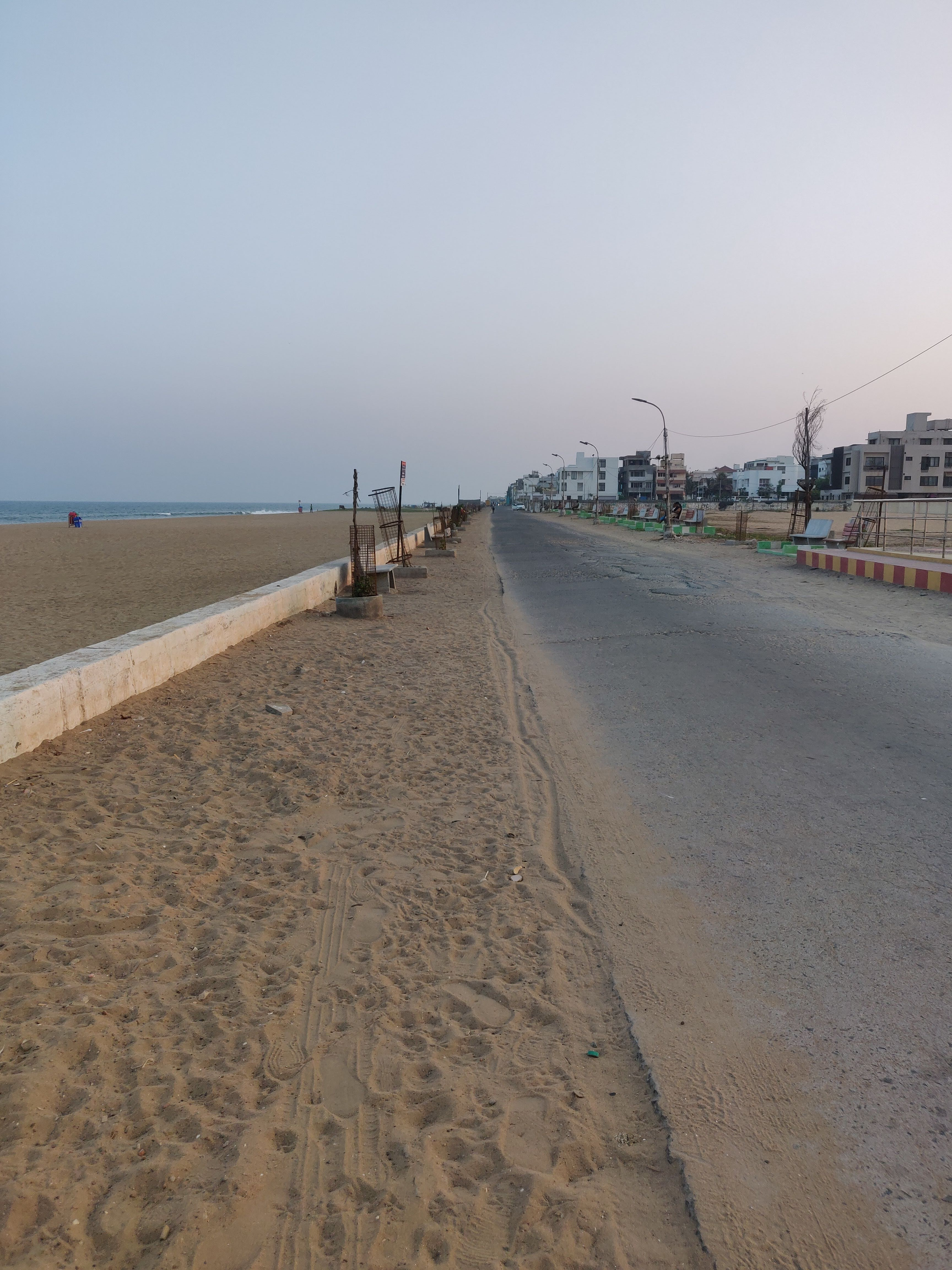
Palavakkam beach, Chennai during the 2020 COVID Lockdown

== Educational institutions ==
The First bilingual International School in Chennai, German International School Chennai is situated in 4/391, Ram Garden, Anna Salai, Palavakkam.
