= Edward Elliot's Beach =

Beach in Chennai, India

- Besant Nagar Beach; Bessie
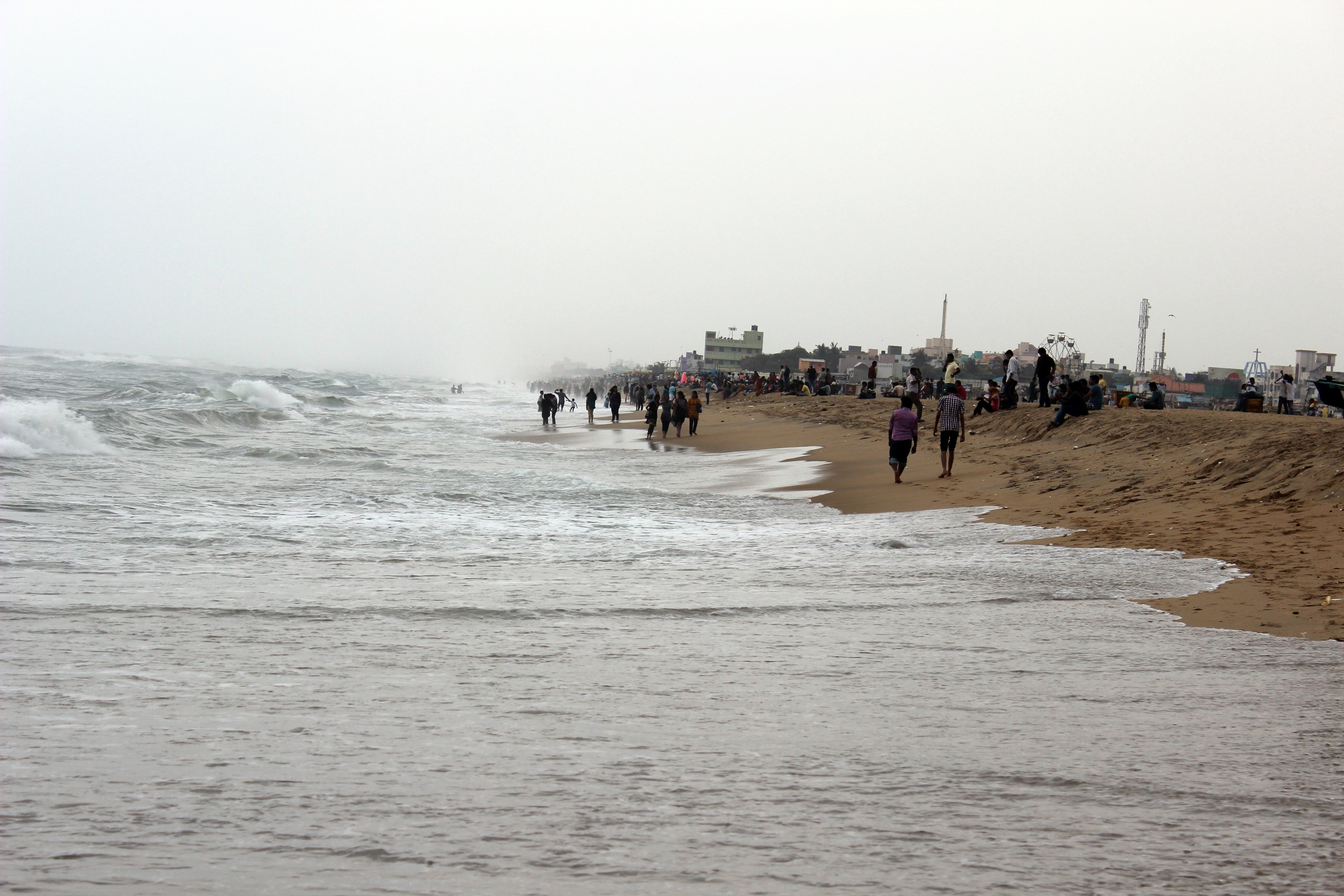
- Interactive map of Edward Elliot's Beach
- Type: Sandy beach
- Location: Besant Nagar, Chennai, India
- Coordinates: 12.999529°N 80.272411°E
- Etymology: Edward Elliot
- Operator: Corporation of Chennai

Edward Elliot's Beach, simply called as Elliot's Beach and popularly known as Besant Nagar Beach or the Bessie, is a natural urban beach located in the Besant Nagar neighbourhood of Chennai, Tamil Nadu, India. It is located next to the southern tip of the Marina Beach, and was named after Edward Elliot, a chief magistrate and superintendent of police of the Madras Presidency in colonial India. It has the Shrine of Our Lady of Good Health—also known as Annai Vailankanni Church—on its shore, and the Ashtalakshmi Temple nearby.

During the colonial era, Elliot's beach was fairly exclusive to white people only. Today, the beach and its Kaj Schmidt Memorial are cultural landmarks of Chennai, visited by thousands daily. Safety on and around the beach is ensured by a police outpost and all-terrain vehicles (ATVs).

== Kaj Schmidt memorial ==
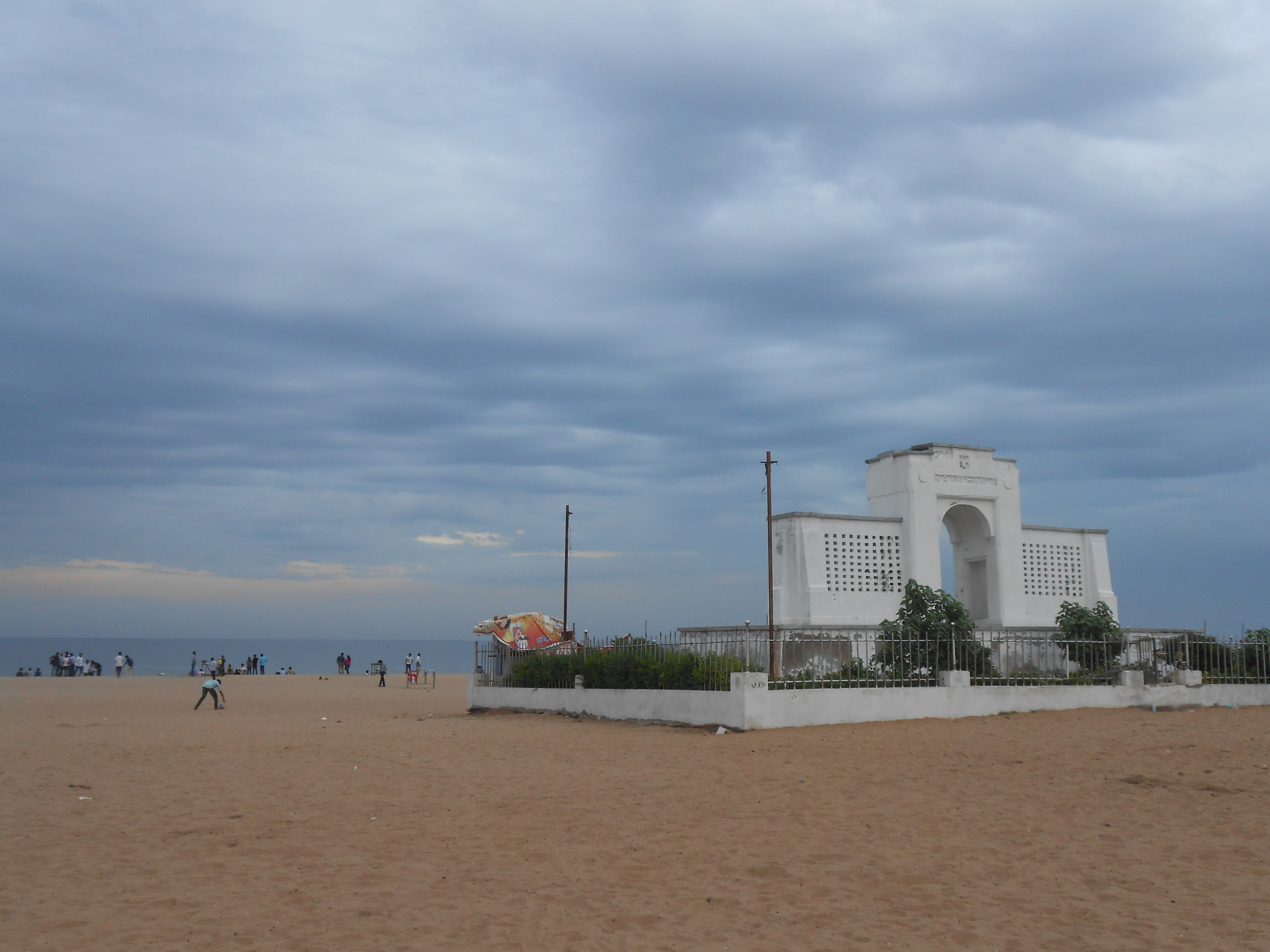
Schmidt Memorial in daylight

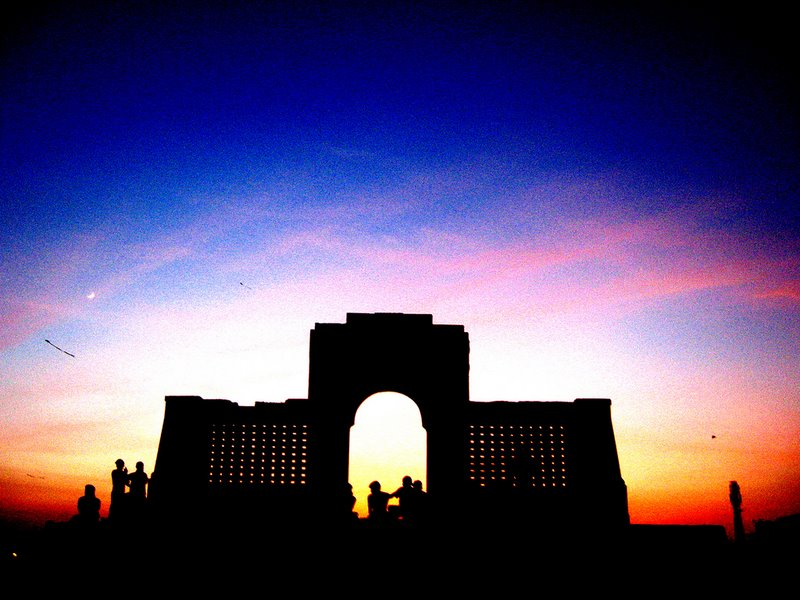
Schmidt Memorial in the evening

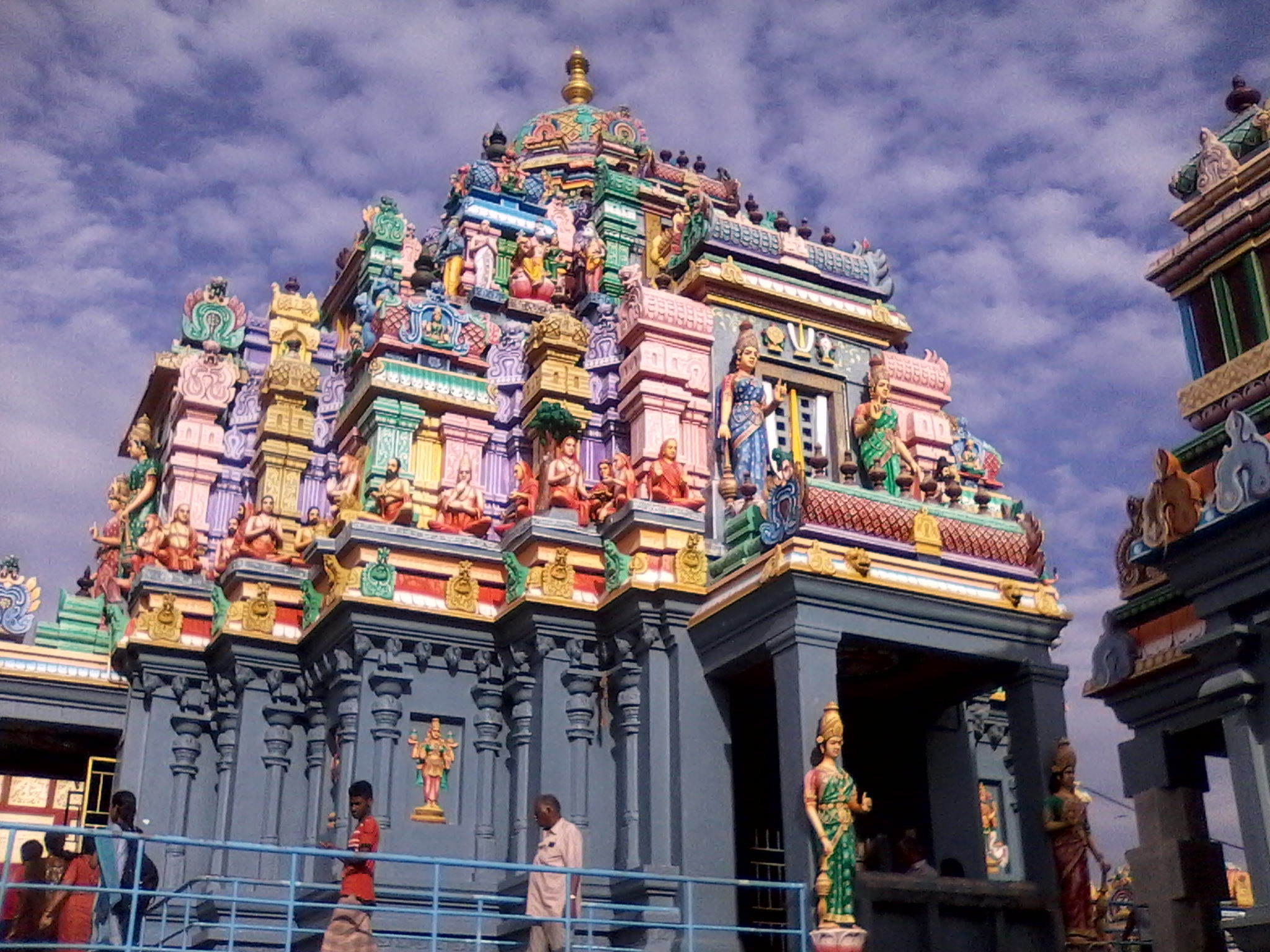
The Ashtalakshmi temple at the beach

A prominent landmark on this beach is the Kaj Schmidt Memorial. The memorial is named after the Danish sailor who lost his life trying to save a girl from drowning.

Elliot's Beach is one of the cleanest and safest beaches in the city of Chennai. It is located towards the south of Marina Beach.

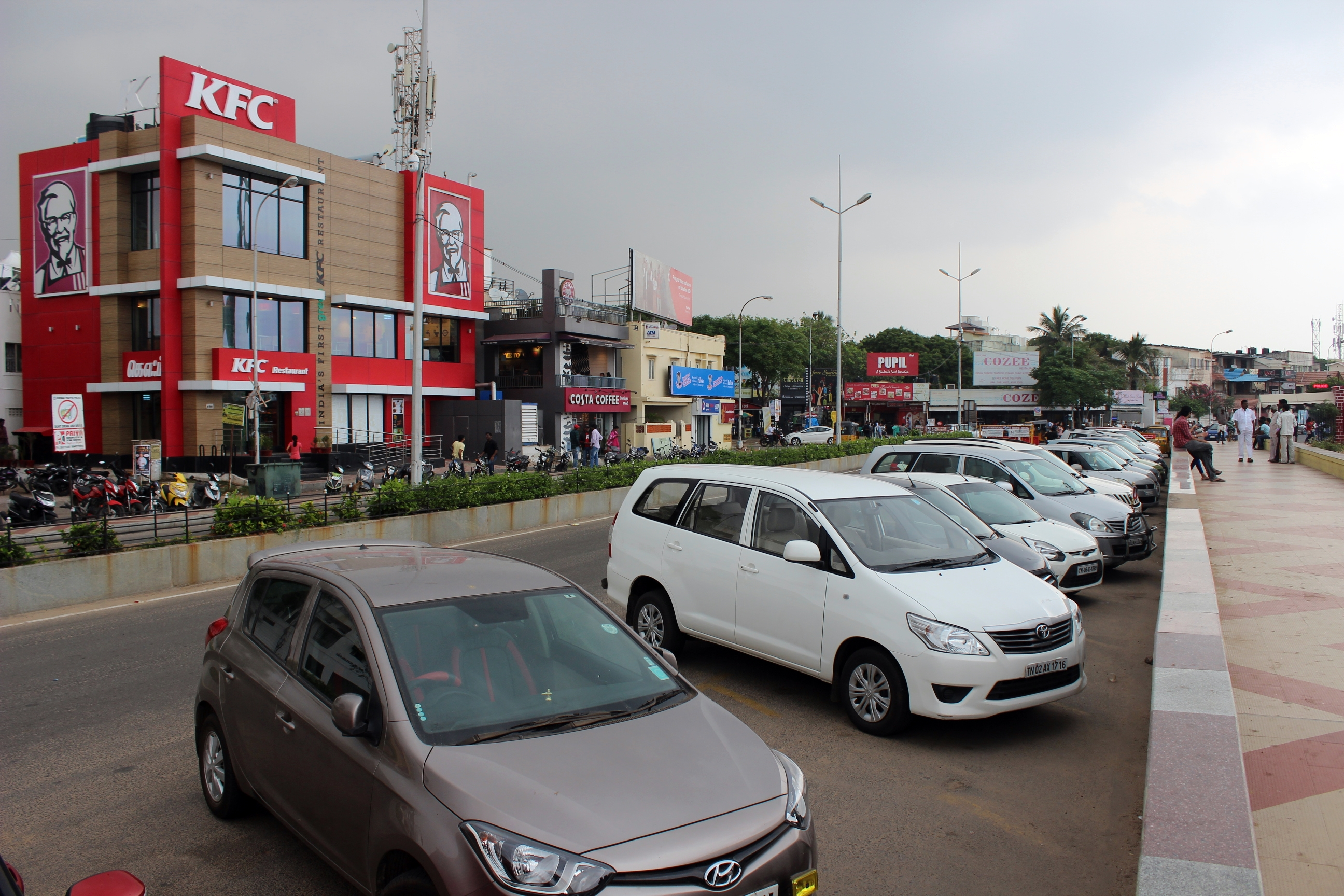
Besant Nagar Beach Road

The Ashtalakshmi Temple, located near the southern end of the beach, was built in 1976 in modern style of architecture.

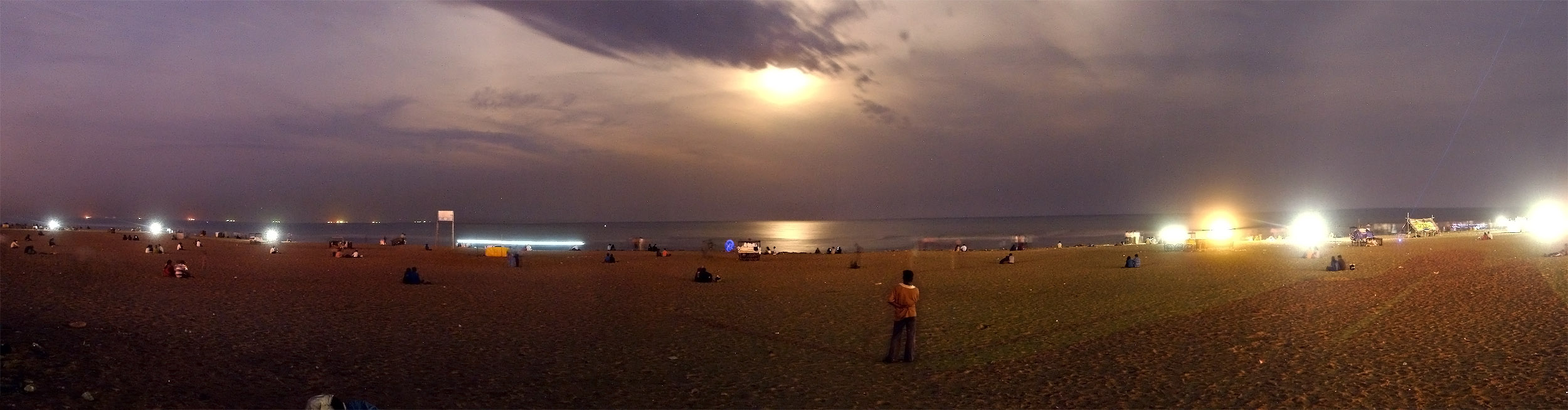
Elliots beach at night

== Safety ==
There is a police outpost on the beach, which is policed by all-terrain vehicles (ATVs). In 2010, there were 11 drowning cases reported off the beach. In August 2012, the government sanctioned two more all-terrain vehicles for patrolling the beach.

== See also ==
- Marina Beach
- Golden Beach
- List of beaches in India
