= Ashtalakshmi Temple, Hyderabad =

Building in India

Ashtalakshmi Temple
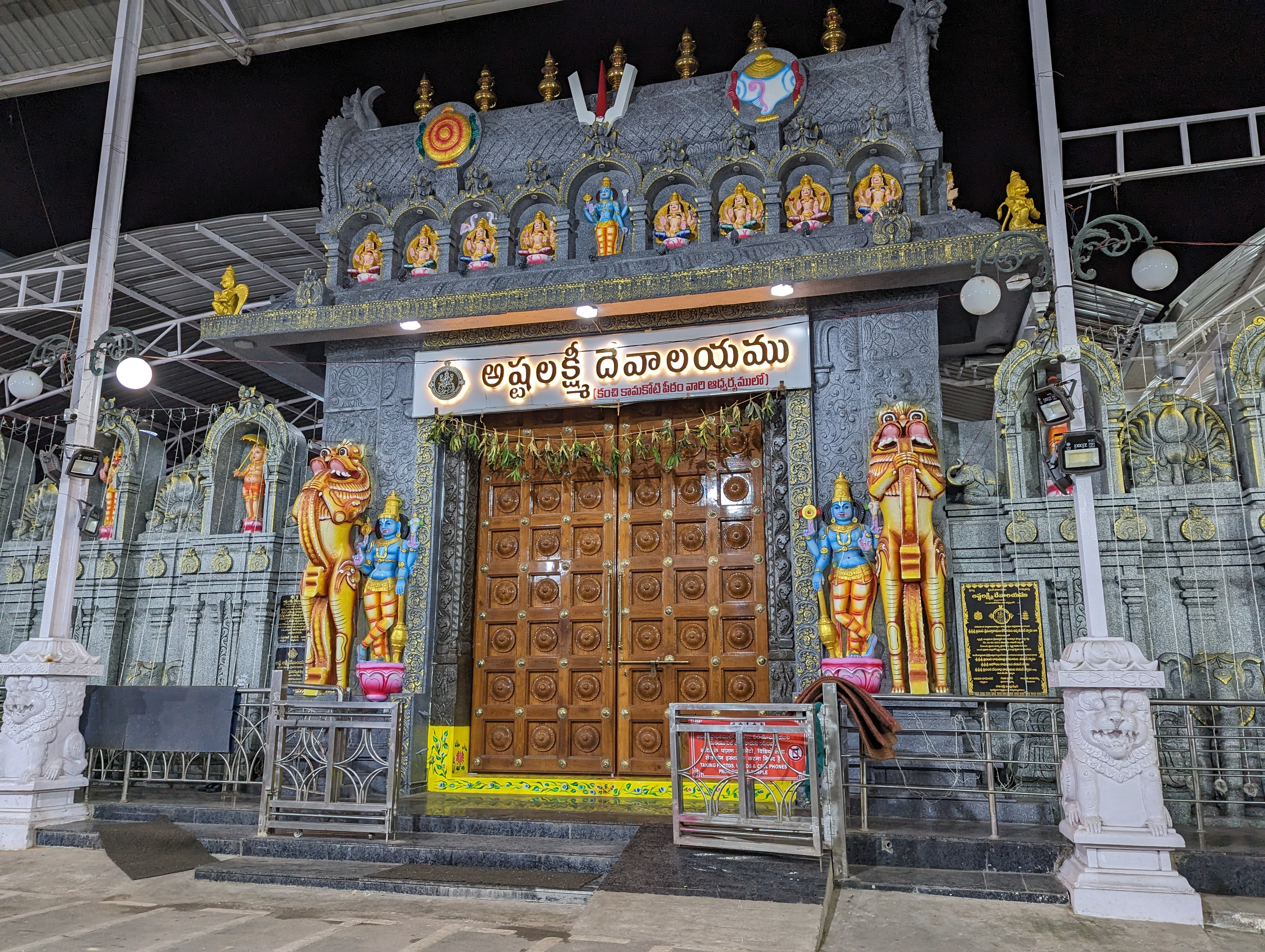

- Location in Telangana Ashtalakshmi Temple, Hyderabad (India)

Religion
- Affiliation: Hinduism
- Deity: Lakshmi - Ashta Lakshmi

Location
- Location: Hyderabad
- State: Telangana
- Country: India
- Interactive map of Ashtalakshmi Temple
- Coordinates: 17.364693°N 78.547896°E

Architecture
- Completed: 1996

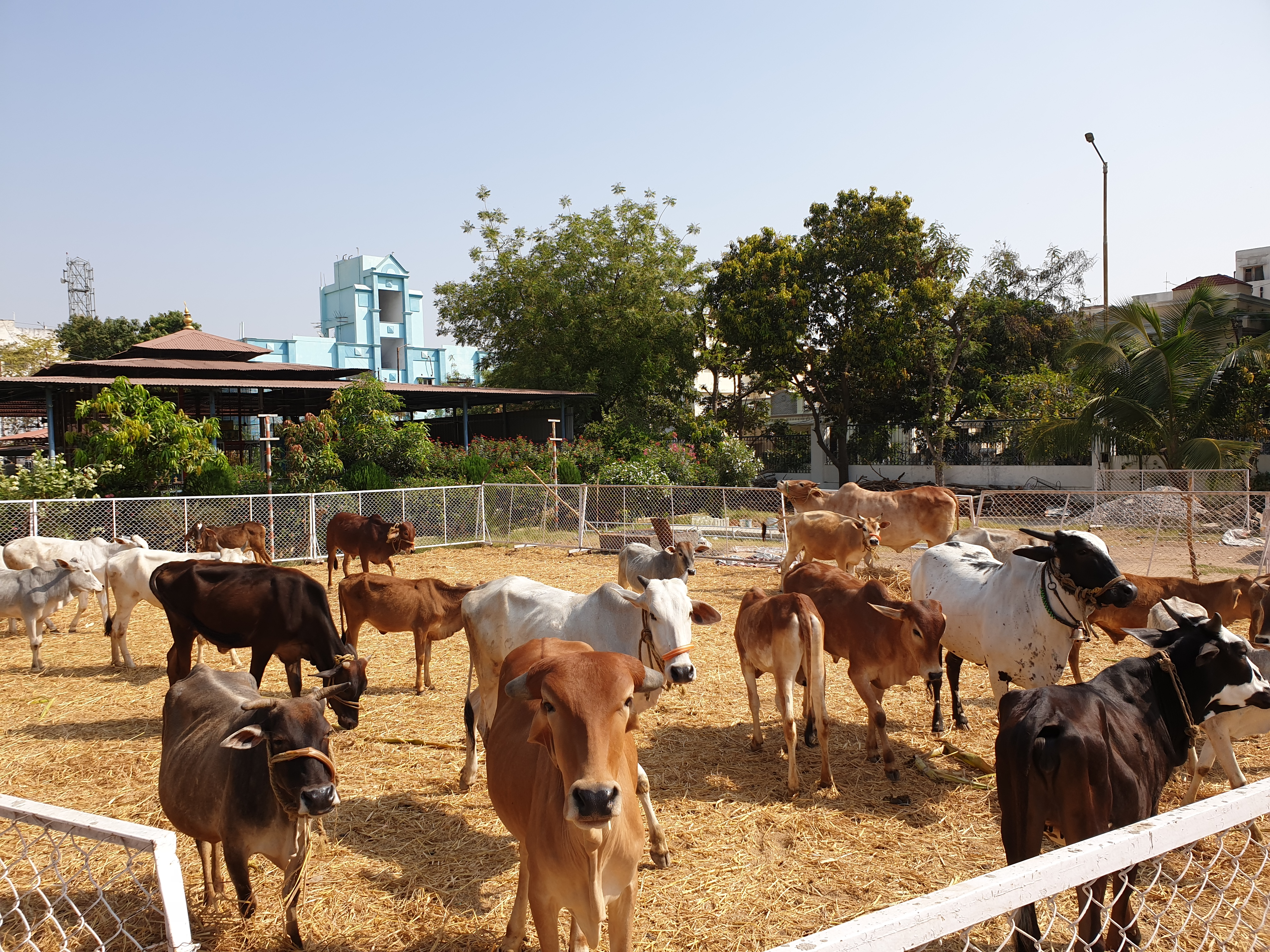
Goshala at Ashtalaxmi temple in Hyderabad

Ashtalakshmi Temple is a Hindu temple of Goddesses Ashtalakshmi in Ramakrishnapuram, Kothapet, Hyderabad, India. The temple located on the outskirts of the city is built in the style of south Indian architecture and presents Goddess Lakshmi in her eight forms.

== History ==
Built under the auspices of the Kanchi Kamakoti Peetam, the temple was consecrated in April 1996. It is one of its kind in the state of Telangana.

Proposals are in the offing to construct a two-storeyed Kalyana Mandapam at a cost of Rs 15 million and an Archaka nilayam residential quarters for the priests.

== Design ==
The design and architecture of the Ashtalakshmi temple was borrowed from the one at Chennai. However, several modifications were made while the construction was initiated.

The Ashtalakshmi temple is a fine example of a collective endeavor. People from many quarters came forward to donate liberally. It took five years of non-stop work and a total expenditure of Rs 10 million for the temple to take its present form.

The architect, Padmashri S.M. Ganapati Sthapathi, and M. Mathiyalagan Sthapathi conceived the structure and design. About 134 vigrahams (idols) of lesser-known gods adorn the mahagopuram.

Although built of sand and cement, the Ashtalakshmi temple reveals the dexterity of the artists. Installed inside are idols of Adilakshmi, Aishwaryalakshmi, Santanalakshmi, Dhanalakshmi, Dhanyalakshmi, Gajalakshmi, Vijayalakshmi and Varalakshmi. Depicting these eight postures, the idols are adorned with gold and kasula Peru necklace and other necklaces. Along with the richly ornamented idols inside the temple, the outside design also boasts intricate carvings on the temple gopuram.

== Location ==
The temple is located between Dilsukh Nagar and LB Nagar, in Vasavi Colony near Kothapet (NH 9).
