= Kaj Schmidt Memorial =

Monument in Chennai, India

Coordinates: 12.999443°N 80.272159°E

- Kaj Schmidt Memorial
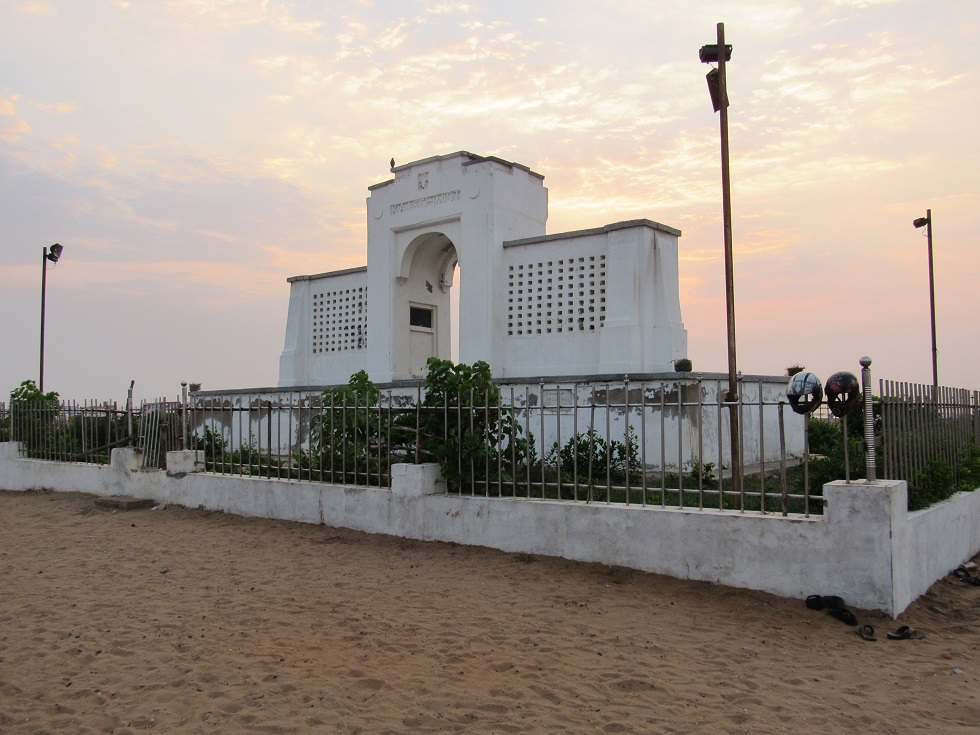
- Kaj Schmidt Memorial at Elliots Beach after restoration
- Interactive map of Kaj Schmidt Memorial
- Location: Besant Nagar, Chennai, India
- Type: Memorial
- Material: Concrete
- Completion date: 1931
- Opening date: 1931
- Dedicated to: Kaj Schmidt

The Kaj Schmidt Memorial is an architectural landmark commemorating a Danish sailor who drowned in 1930 trying to save the life of a woman. It is located at Elliot's Beach in Chennai, Tamil Nadu, India. The monument had been in a derelict state, but was restored starting in 2013.

== History ==
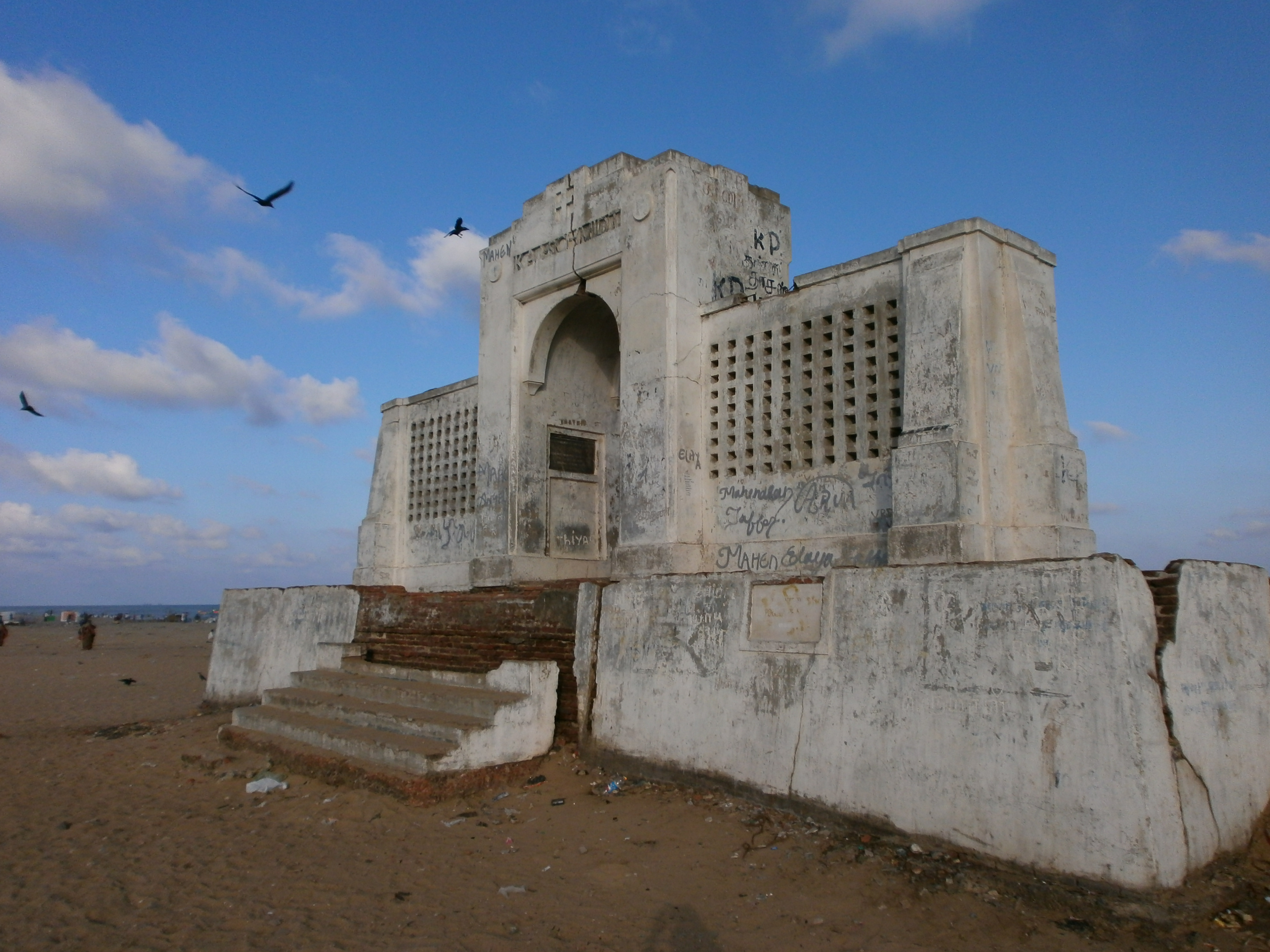
Kaj Schmidt memorial in a dilapidated condition before restoration

According to historians, Kaj Schmidt, who had gone to the beach, saw an English girl getting into the water who soon started struggling against the tide. In a successful attempt to save her life, he lost his own. The English girl, whom Schmidt saved from the sea, attended a party the following evening as though nothing had happened. The then governor, who was apparently angry with her, built the landmark to memorialize Schmidt's actions.

== The memorial ==
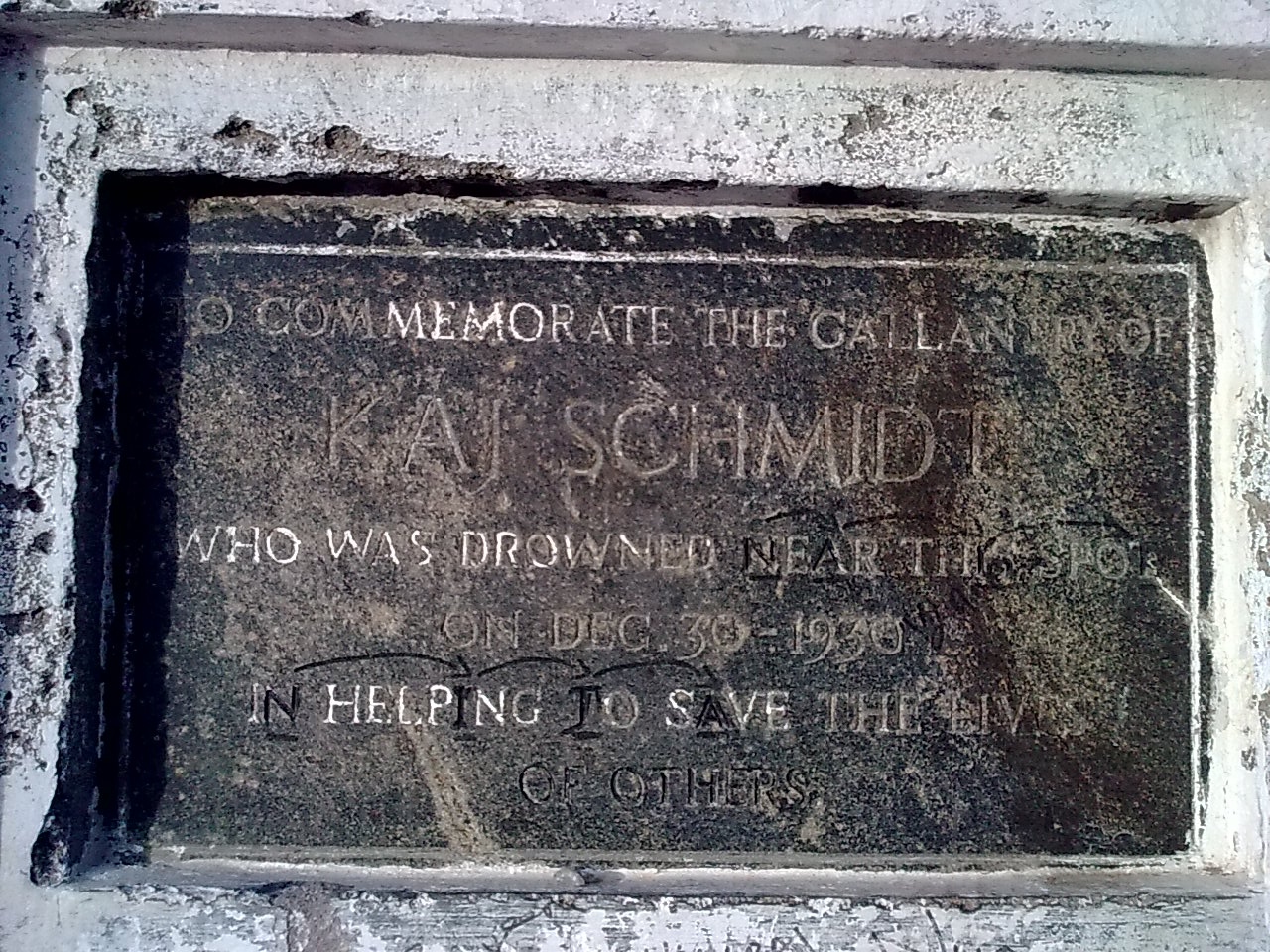
The plaque at Kaj Schmidt Memorial

According to experts, the brick structure lacks a stone foundation. The uneven base and the sea water have caused damage to the memorial over the years.

The memorial is the only heritage structure on Elliot's Beach. The memorial stone in the memorial reads, "To commemorate the gallantry of Kaj Schmidt who was drowned near this spot on December 30, 1930 while helping to save the lives of others."

At the initiative of an 87-year-old lady, in March 2013, the Corporation of Chennai announced that it would restore the memorial. In connection with the planned restoration of the memorial, the Chennai Corporation announced on 4 February 2014 that it plans to utilize fiber wrapping technology to reinforce the structure. The restoration was done by IIT Madras and REACH Foundation.

For the memorial to earn a heritage tag, it must survive until 2030. As of 2018, there is an enclosure around the memorial and the cracks in the structure have been mended. However, there is still a lot of graffiti on the white surface and people regularly climb the structure to take selfies. There are no security guards to discourage such actions.

The memorial is features in the cult classic Malayalam movie Nadodikattu. The film follows two impoverished young men, Ramdas (Mohanlal) and Vijayan (Sreenivasan), who fail at finding a job in Kerala and plan to immigrate to Dubai to make their fortunes; they instead get deceived and end up at the memorial. The spot has become a tourist destination for Keralites thanks to the film.
