= Ashta Lakshmi =

Eight manifestations of the Hindu goddess Lakshmi

- Goddess of Prosperity and Wealth; Supreme Goddess in Vaishnavism
- Devanagari: अष्टलक्ष्मी
- Sanskrit transliteration: aṣṭalakṣmī
- Affiliation: Lakshmi, Sri Vaishnavism, Mahadevi
- Abode: Vaikuntha, Manidvipa
- Mantra: Ashtalakshmi Stotra
- Weapon: Khanda (sword), Bow and Arrow, Trishula (Trident), Chakra (discus), Gada (mace), Ankusha (goad) and Shield
- Mount: Lotus, Owl, Eagle, Lion, Elephant
- Consort: Vishnu

Ashta Lakshmi (Sanskrit: अष्टलक्ष्मी, IAST: Aṣṭalakṣmī; lit. "Octet of Lakshmi") or Ashtalakshmi, is a group of the eight manifestations of Lakshmi, the Hindu goddess of prosperity. She presides over eight sources of wealth: spirituality, material wealth, agriculture, royalty, knowledge, courage, progeny, and victory.

The Ashta Lakshmi are always depicted and worshipped as an octet in temples.

== Iconography ==
=== Adi Lakshmi ===
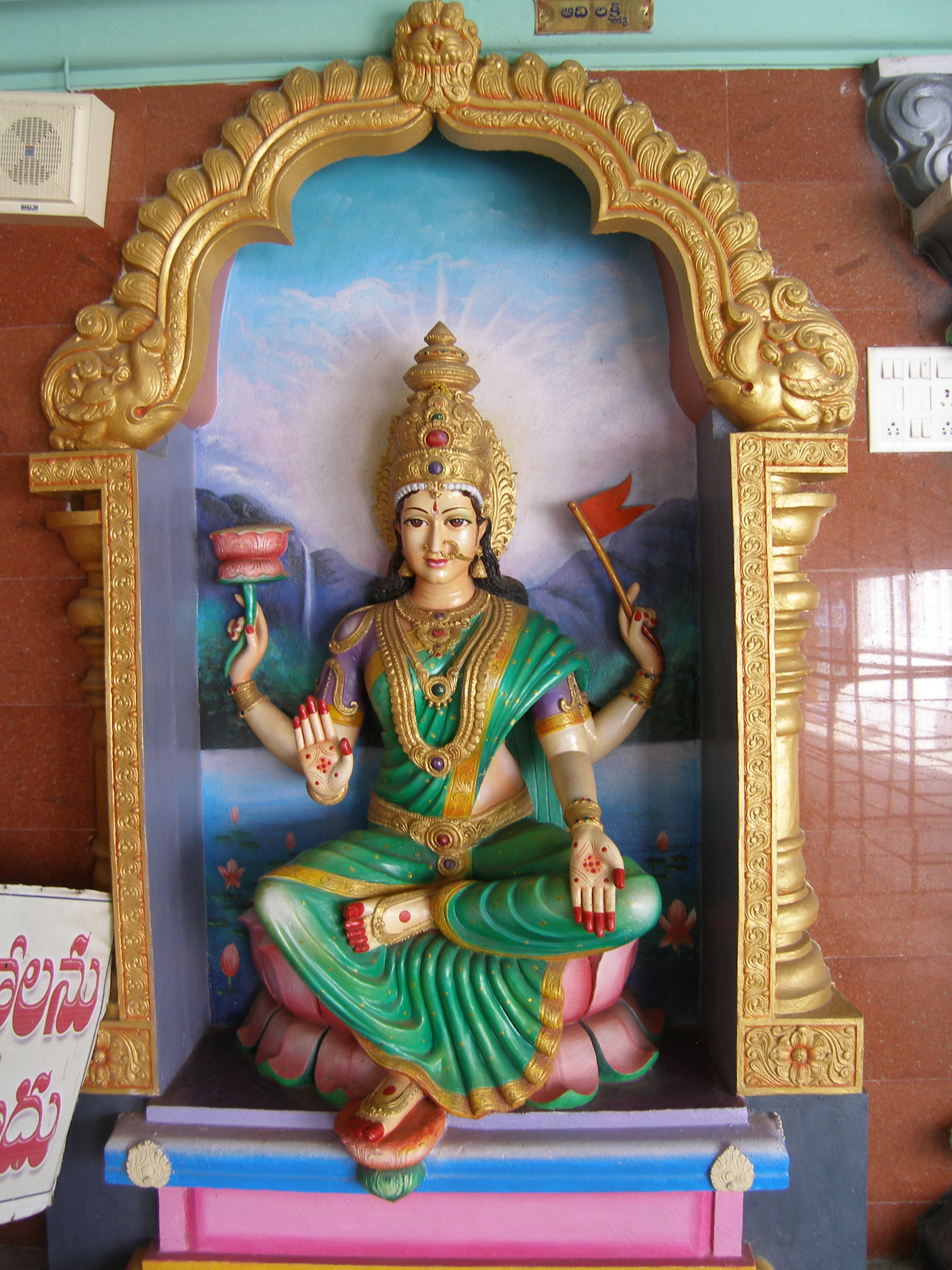
Adi Lakshmi

Adi Lakshmi (Primeval Lakshmi) is portrayed to be the earliest forms of Lakshmi.

Adi Lakshmi is the manifestation who supports a seeker to reach their source, or Atman. She is believed to proffer dhyana, a state of absolute silence, bliss, and peace. This aspect of the goddess is responsible for the furtherance in the quest for spiritual wealth.

She is depicted as four-armed, carrying a lotus and a red flag, and other two arms expressing the abhaya mudra (fearlessness pose) and the varada mudra (blessing pose).

=== Dhana Lakshmi ===
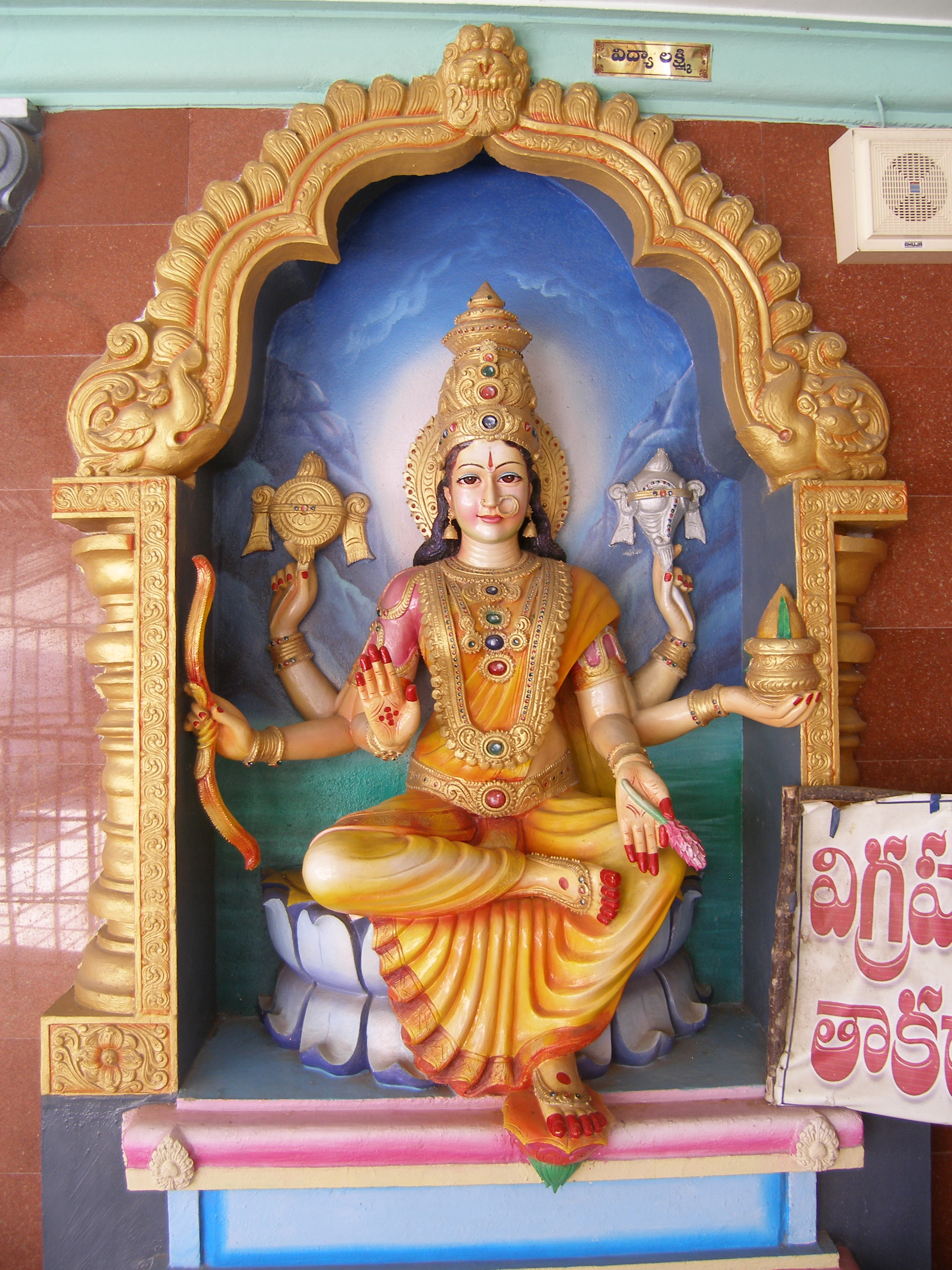
Dhana Lakshmi

Dhana Lakshmi (Wealth Lakshmi) is Lakshmi in her form as the goddess of material wealth.

Dhana Lakshmi is depicted with six hands, in red garments, carries the Sudarshana Chakra, shankha, kalasha (a water pitcher with mango leaves and a coconut on it) or the Amrita Kalasha (a pitcher containing Amrita – the elixir of life), a bow and arrow, a lotus, and an arm performing the abhaya mudra, with gold coins falling from it.

=== Dhanya Lakshmi ===
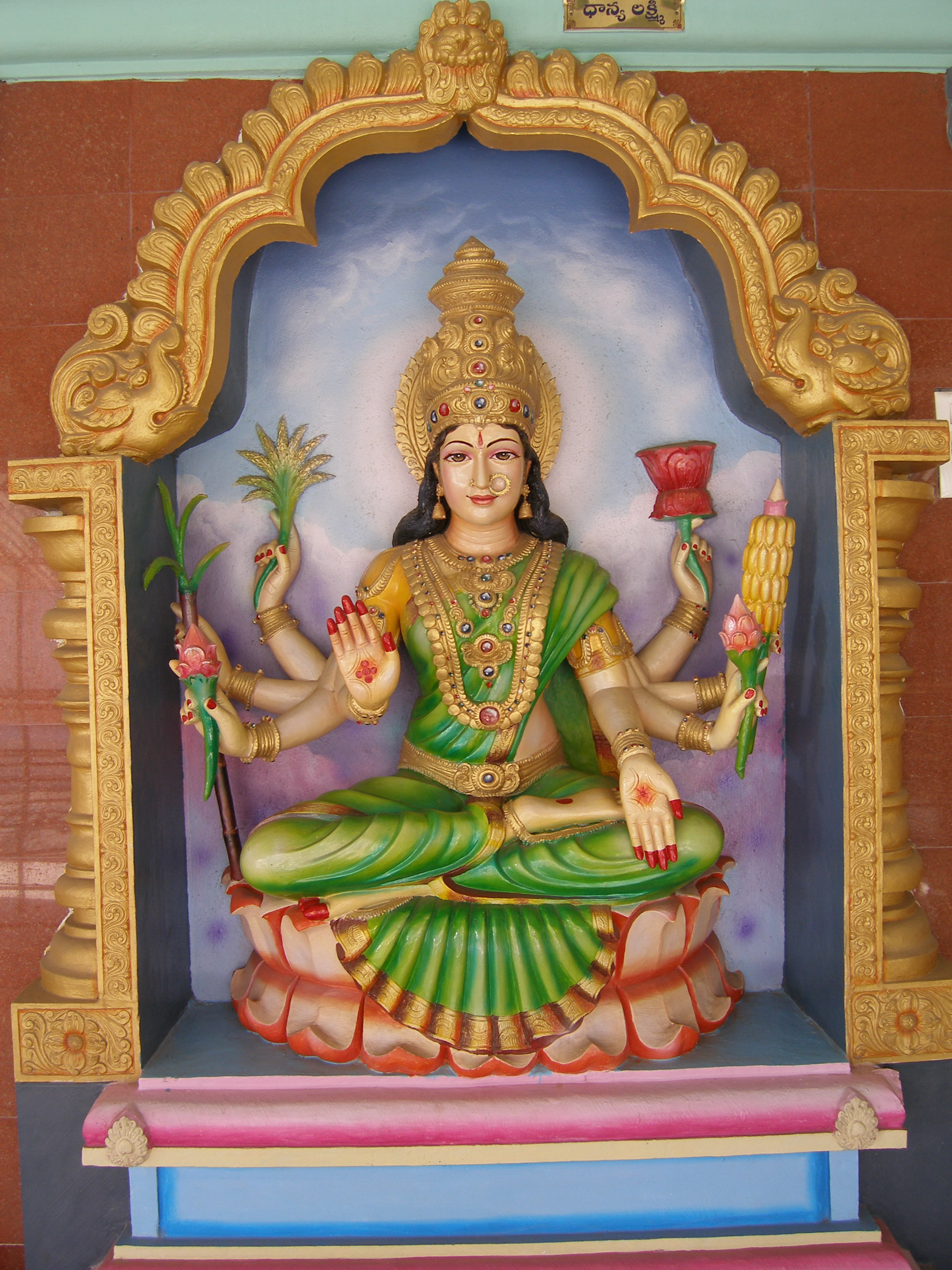
Dhanya Lakshmi

Dhanya Lakshmi (Grain Lakshmi) is the form of Lakshmi who represents the wealth of agriculture. Dhanya Lakshmi is also the aspect of Lakshmi who provides resources to adherents for their sustenance and well-being.

She is depicted as eight-armed, dressed in green garments, carrying two lotuses, a gada (mace), paddy crop, sugarcane, and bananas. Her hands express the abhaya mudra and the varada mudra.

=== Gaja Lakshmi ===
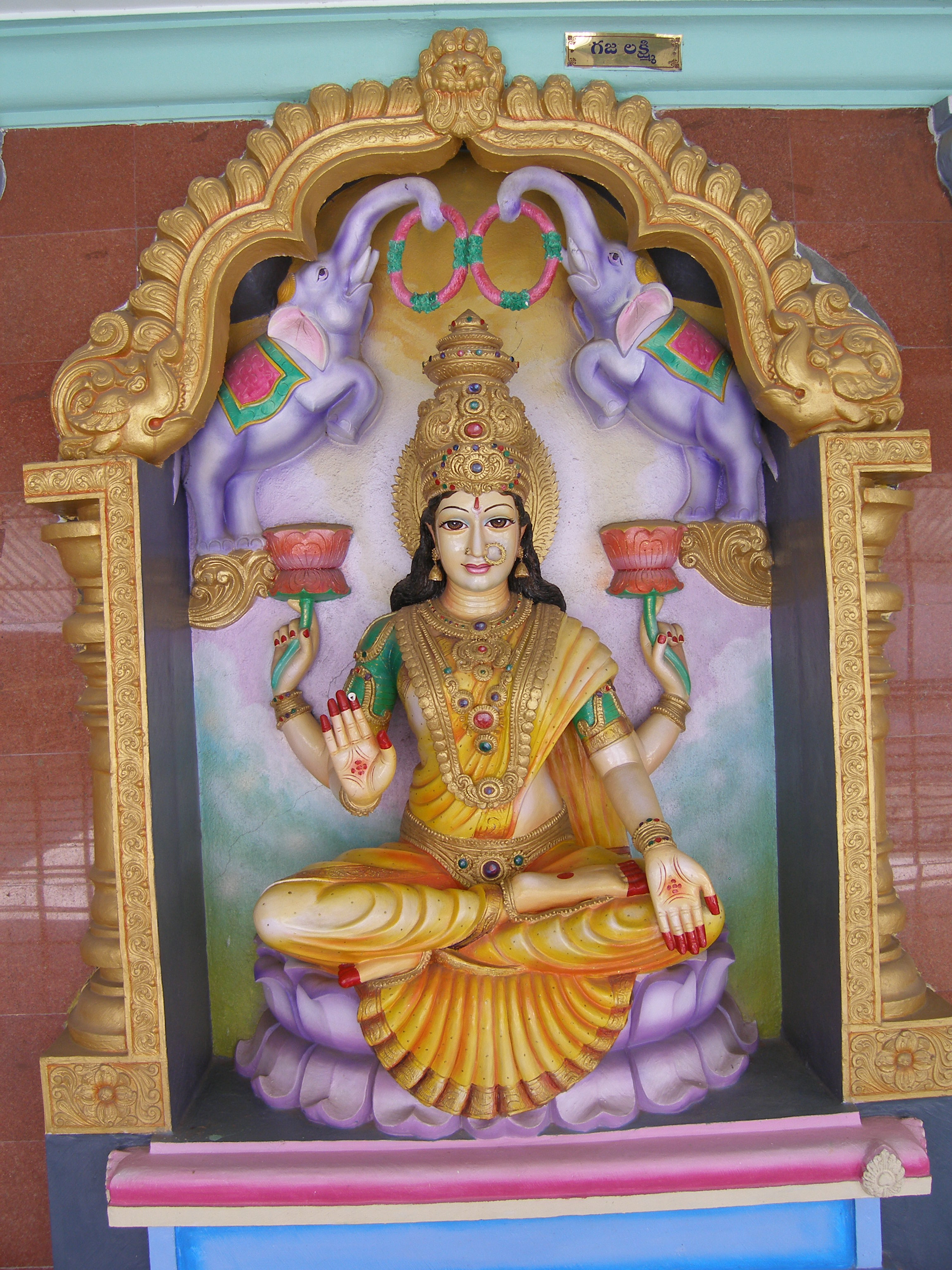
Gaja Lakshmi

Gaja Lakshmi (Elephant Lakshmi) is the giver of animal wealth (such as cattle), or the being who offers royal splendour, according to the Narayana Pancharatra.

According to Hinduism, Gaja Lakshmi restored the potent lost by Indra (King of the devas) during the Samudra Manthana. Vasudha Narayanan has interpreted this name as the, "one who is worshipped by elephants".

She is depicted as four-armed, donning red garments, carrying two lotuses, two arms expressing the abhaya mudra and the varada mudra, surrounded by two elephants bathing her with water pots.

=== Santana Lakshmi ===
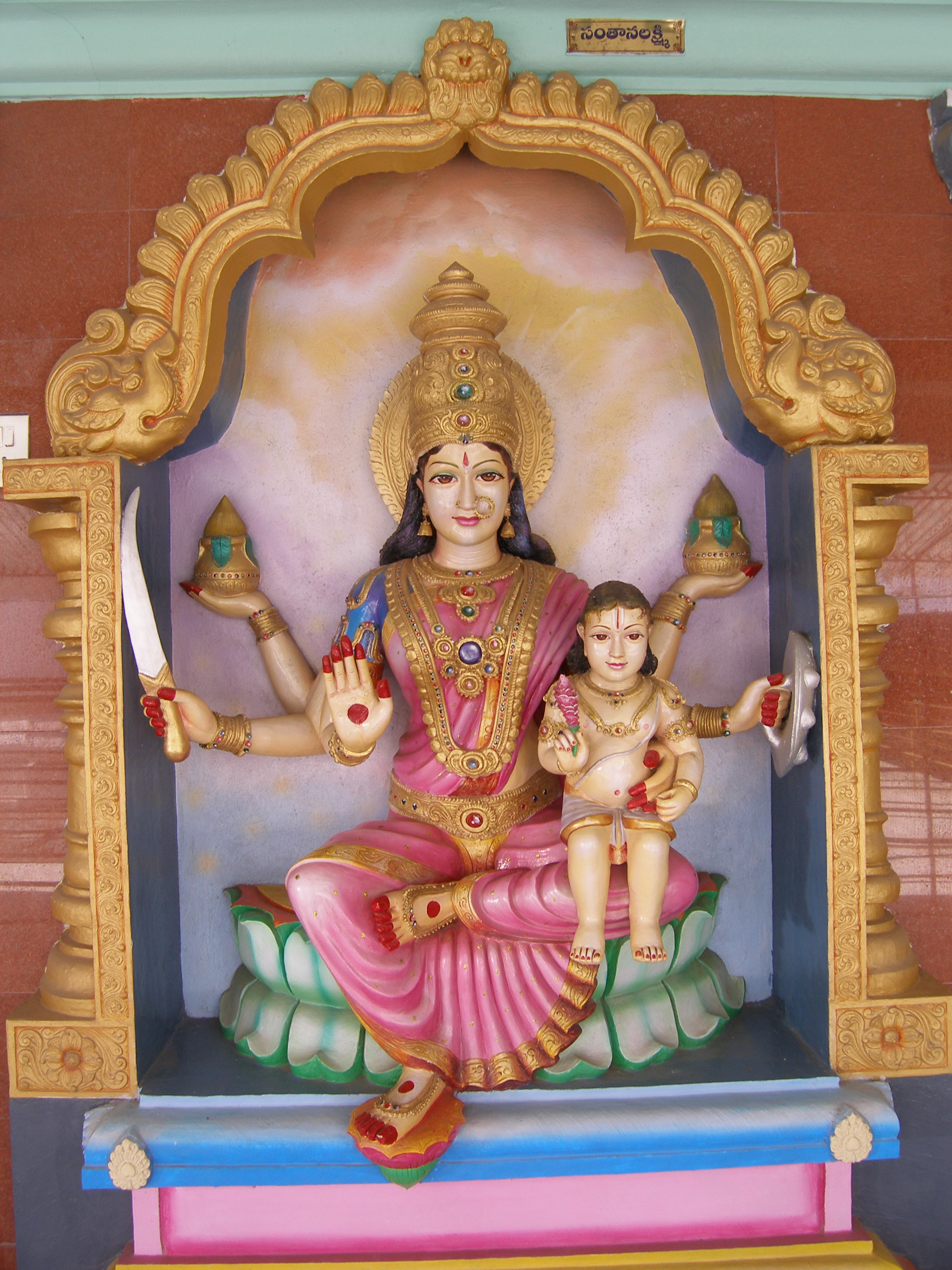
Santhana Lakshmi

Santana Lakshmi (Lakshmi of Children) is the goddess's manifestation who bestows offspring.

She is depicted as six-armed, carrying two kalashas (water pitcher with mango leaves and a coconut on it), a sword, a shield, a child on her lap, a hand in abhaya mudra, and the other holding Prana as a child holding the lotus (it's indirectly implied in Skanda Purana).

=== Dhairya Lakshmi ===
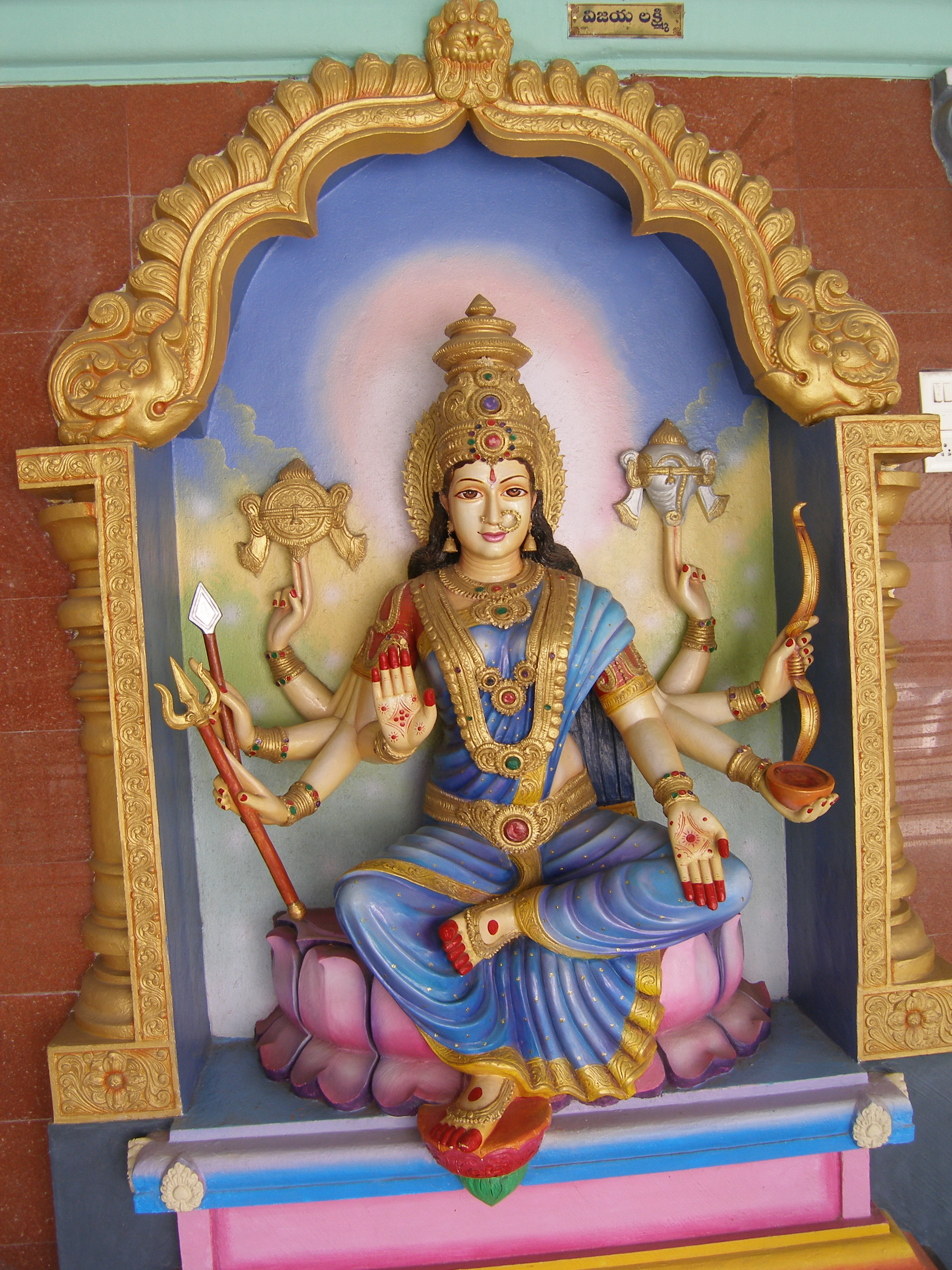
Veera/Dhairya Lakshmi

Dhairya Lakshmi (Courage Lakshmi), or Veera Lakshmi (Valourous Lakshmi), is a form of Lakshmi inspired by Durga. She is the form of the goddess who bestows valour during battles and courage plus strength for overcoming difficulties in life.

She is depicted as eight-armed, seated on a lion, in red garments, carrying a chakra, shankha, bow, arrow, trishula (or a sword), a bundle of palm leaf scriptures, other two hands in the abhaya mudra and the varada mudra.

=== Vijaya Lakshmi ===
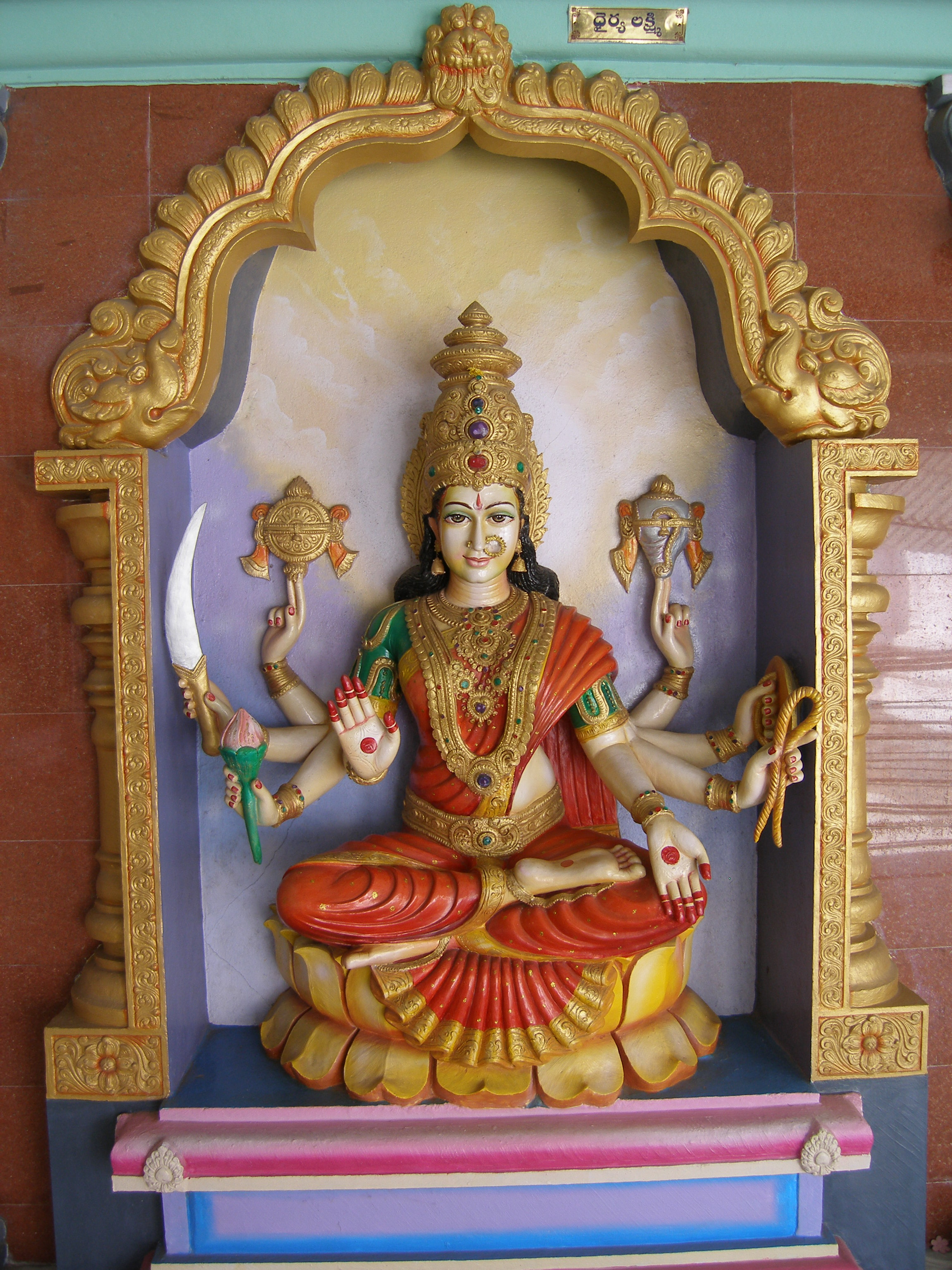
Vijaya Lakshmi

Vijaya Lakshmi or Jaya Lakshmi (Victorious Lakshmi) is also a manifestation drawn from Durga. She is form of the goddess who bestows victory, not only in battles, but also for conquering hurdles in order to achieve success.

She is depicted as eight-armed, dressed in red garments, carrying the chakra, shankha, sword, shield, lotus, pasha, and other two hands expressing the abhaya mudra and the varada mudra.

=== Vidya Lakshmi ===
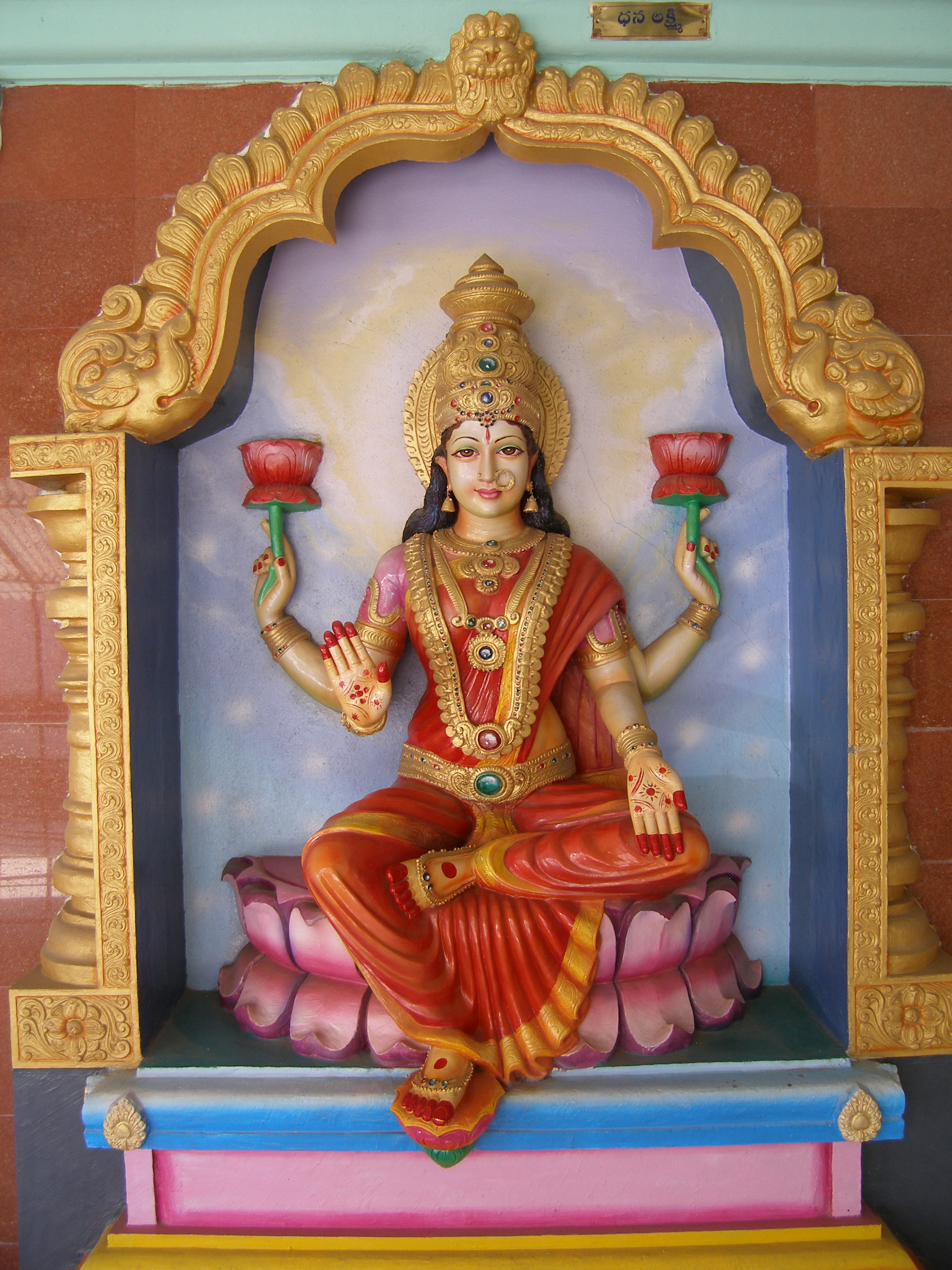
Vidya Lakshmi

Vidya Lakshmi (Knowledge Lakshmi) is the goddess and the bestower of knowledge of arts and the sciences.

She is dressed in a red saree and has a resemblance to the goddess Saraswati. She holds a book of the Vedas, a peacock feather as a pen, the varada mudra and the abhaya mudra.

=== Other forms ===
In some Ashta Lakshmi lists, other forms of Lakshmi are included:

1. Aishvarya Lakshmi (Auspicious Lakshmi): The goddess who bestows auspices, and the only form of Lakshmi who mounts a horse. She generally replaces Vidya Lakshmi from the Ashta Lakshmi list.
2. Saubhagya Lakshmi (Fortune Lakshmi): The manifestation who furnishes good fortune.
3. Rajya Lakshmi (Royal Lakshmi): The form of Lakshmi who bestows majesty, revered by monarchs.
4. Vara Lakshmi (Boon Lakshmi): The form of the goddess who bestows boons. This form of Lakshmi is venerated on the occasion of Varalakshmi Vratam.

== Worship ==
The octagram, or eight-pointed star polygon (Schläfli {8/2} or 2{4}), commonly misattributed to symbolize Ashtalakshmi due to being called the Star of Lakshmi in The Return of the Pink Panther

Around the 1970s, a leading Sri Vaishnava theologian, UV Srinivasa Varadachariar, published a hymn called the Ashtalakshmi Stotra dedicated to the eight forms of Lakshmi. Narayanan comments:

“Although these attributes (which represent the wealths bestowed by the Ashta Lakshmi) of Sri (Lakshmi) can be found in traditional literature, the emergence of these eight (Ashta Lakshmi goddesses) in precisely this combination is, as far as I can discern, new.”

The prayer Ashtalakshmi Stotra lists all of the Ashta Lakshmi, in which the goddess is depicted as seated on a lotus. The rise in popularity of the Ashta Lakshmi can be linked with the rising popularity of the Ashtalakshmi Stotra.

Ashta Lakshmi is now widely worshipped both by Sri Vaishnava and other Hindu communities in South India. Occasionally, Ashta Lakshmi is depicted together in shrines or in "framing pictures" within an overall design and are worshipped by votaries of Lakshmi who worship her in her various manifestations. In addition to emergence of Ashta Lakshmi temples since the 1970s, traditional silver articles used in home worship as well as decorative jars (kumbha) now appear with the Ashta Lakshmi group molded on their sides.

Books, popular prayers manuals, pamphlets sold outside temples in South India, ritual worship, and "a burgeoning audiocassette market" also presently popularise the octet of Lakshmi.

== Temples ==
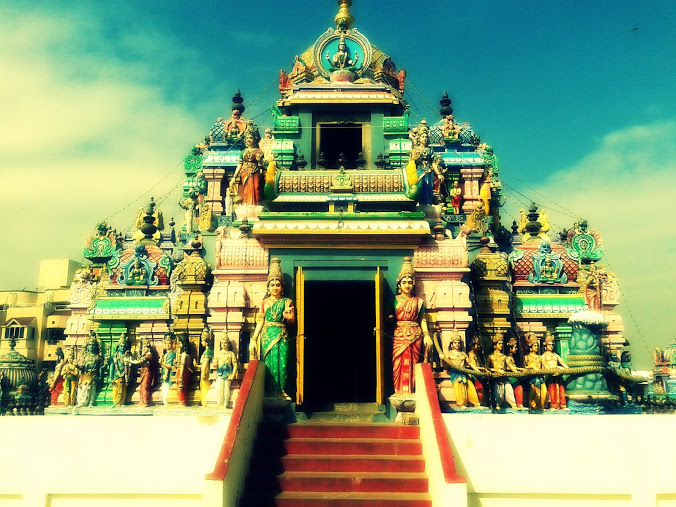
Ashtalakshmi Kovil - Temple of Eight Lakshmi's, Chennai, Tamil Nadu, India.

- Ashtalakshmi Temple, Besant Nagar, Chennai, Tamil Nadu, India: The Ashta Lakshmi Kovil, built in 1974, is the first shrine dedicated exclusively to the Ashta Lakshmi where Lakshmi is given greater importance than Vishnu. It has eight small shrines arranged in clockwise direction, dedicated to the Ashta Lakshmi and then a ninth shrine dedicated to Vishnu and Lakshmi together, unlike the traditional separate shrines.
- Ashtalakshmi Temple, Vasavi Colony, Dilsukh Nagar, Hyderabad, Andhra Pradesh, India
- Sydney Durga Temple - The Hindu Temple, located in Regents Park, Sydney, Australia has 8 small sanctums dedicated to the Ashta Lakshmi.
- Ashtalakshmi Temple, Sugar Land, Houston, Texas, United States
- Ashtalakshmi Temple, North Hollywood, California, United States
- At the entrance - leading from Vittavasal Street to Meenakshi Temple, Madhurai, a mandapam (Hall) called Ashta Lakshmi Mandapam is dedicated to the Ashta Lakshmi, the statues of which support the roof on either side.
- Parashakthi Temple, Pontiac, Michigan has the deities installed there.
- Asta Lakshmi Temple, Gwalior.
- Asta Lakshmi Devasthanam, Fremont, California.
- Ashtalakshmi at Dr. Vasant Vijay Guruji Ashram
- Sree Mahalakshmi Temple, Cheruthazham, Kerala
- Sree Vasudevapuram Mahavishnu temple situated in Ernakulam district of Kerala India conducts the Ashtalakshmi Thampoolasamprana Mahotsavam every year starting on the eve of Akshaya Tritheye. The belief is that Maha Lakshmi gives darshan and shower blessings on devotees only on eight days in a year as Ashta Lakshmi. The most auspicious ritual of the temple known as the Thampoolasamarpanam is performed during the mahotsavam.

== See also ==
- Lakshmi Planum
- Ashtasakhi
- Ashtabharya
