= Varasiddhi Vinayaka Temple =

Hindu temple in Chennai, India

Coordinates: 13.000397°N 80.266996°E

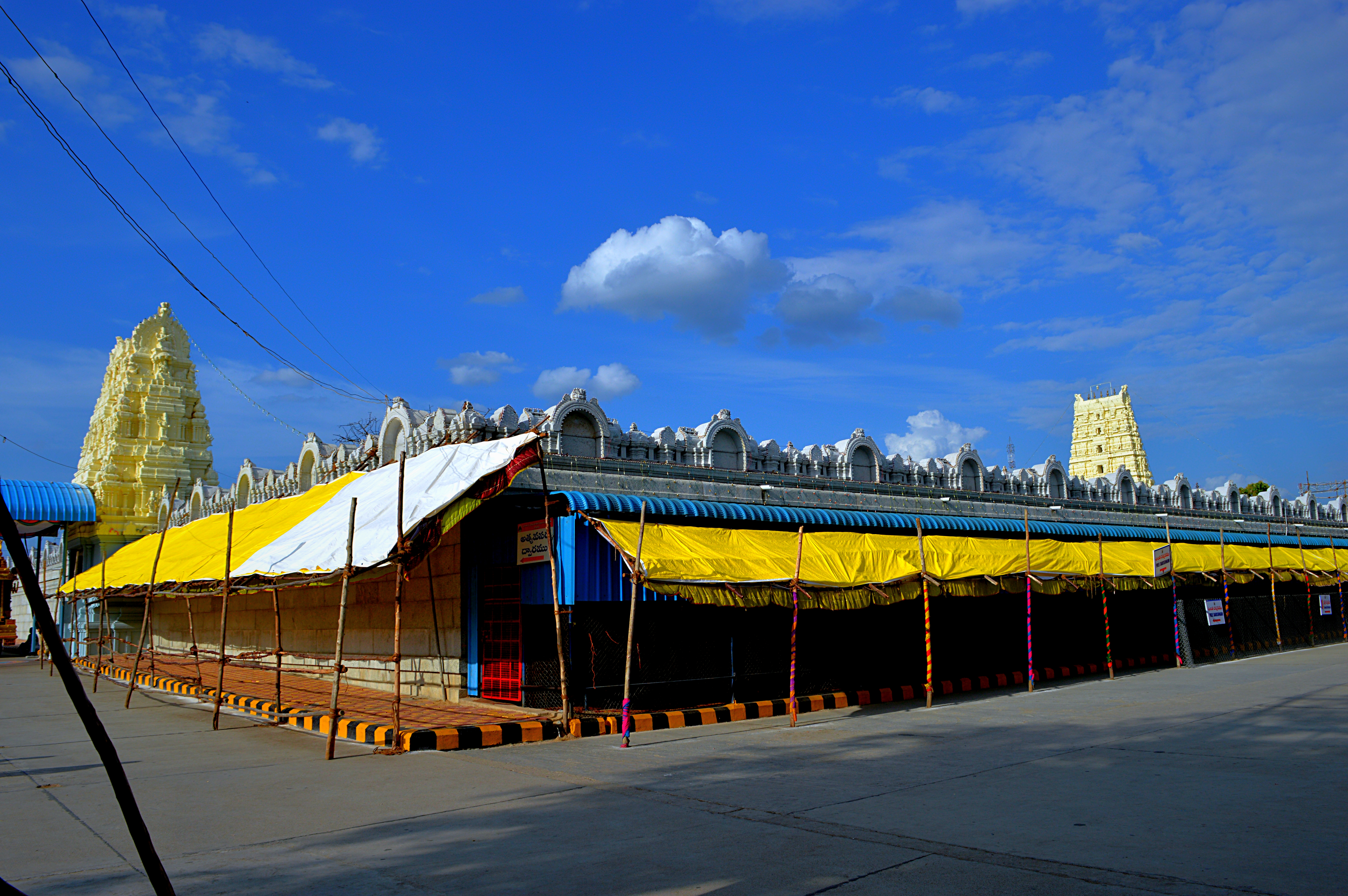
- Varasiddhi Vinayaka Temple in 2012

Religion
- Affiliation: Hinduism
- District: Chennai
- Deity: Lord Vinayaka

Location
- Location: Besant Nagar
- State: Tamil Nadu
- Country: India
- Interactive map of Varasiddhi Vinayaka Temple

The Varasiddhi Vinayakar Temple in Besant Nagar, Chennai, India is a Hindu temple, located near the beach in Besant Nagar. It is dedicated to the Hindu god Vinayaka or Ganesha. The temple participates in activities such as feeding the poor and holds poojas frequently.

The first Kumbabhishekam (consecration) of the temple after extension activity was held in April, 1979 before which the idol was being worshiped at a site opposite the present site of the temple, within the CPWD Quarters compound. In fact, in the sanctum sanctorum, we see the idol of Valampuri Varasiddhi Vinayakar with Consort Siddhi held at His left. Over this idol, we see a small Ganesh Idol. This was the original idol that was being worshipped at the original site.

Subsequent developments took place rapidly, like, construction of an auditorium behind the praharam on the eastern side and Goshala. The Temple conducts music programme during Vinayakar Chathurthi time in this auditorium.

== See also ==
- Religion in Chennai
