= Ashtalakshmi Temple, Chennai =

Hindu temple of Ashtalakshmi in Chennai, India

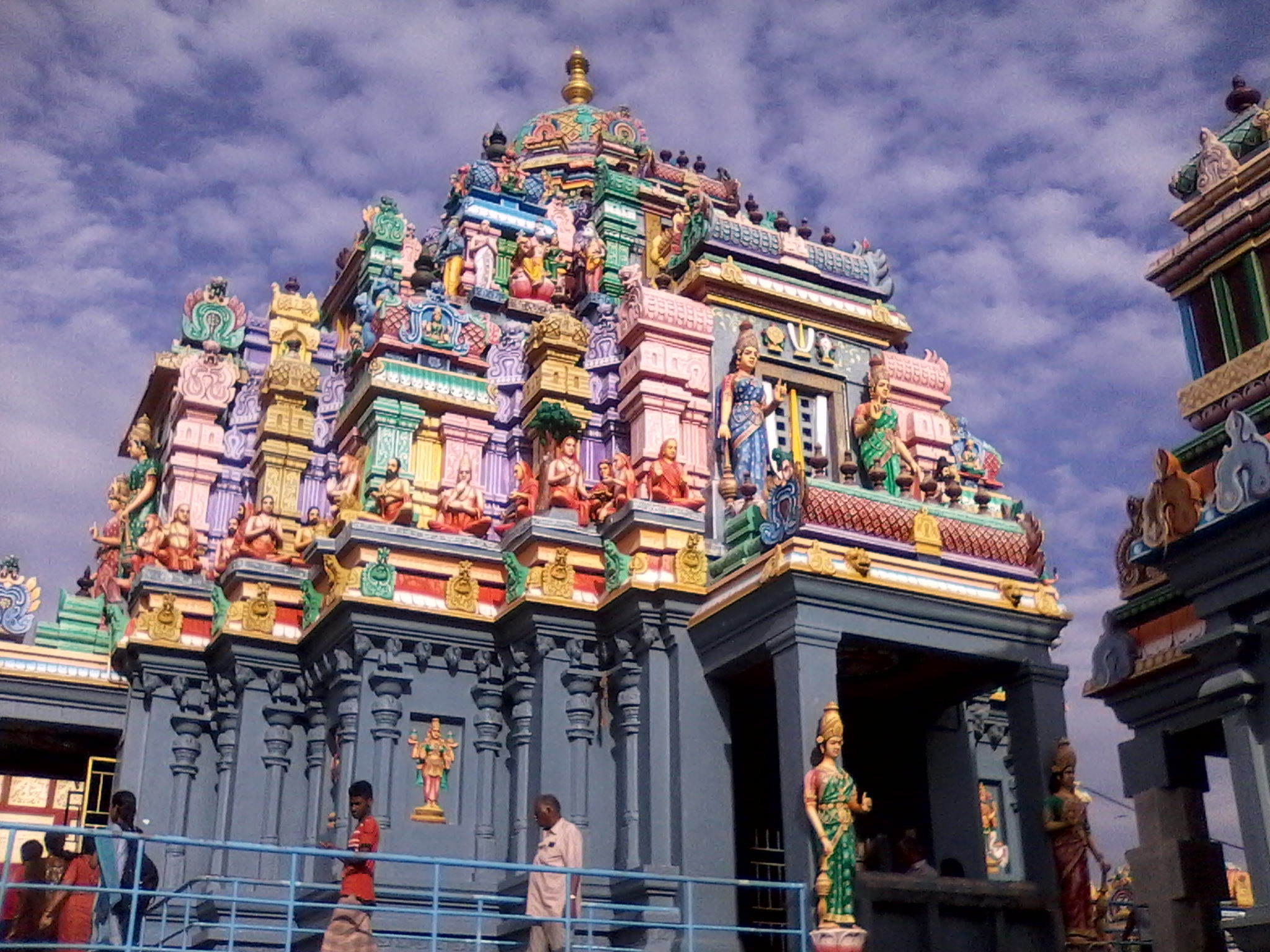
- The Ashtalakshmi Temple in Chennai

- Ashtalakshmi Temple, Besant Nagar, Chennai, Tamil Nadu

Religion
- Affiliation: Hinduism
- District: Chennai
- Deity: Ashta Lakshmi

Location
- Location: Besant Nagar, Chennai
- State: Tamil Nadu
- Country: India
- Interactive map of Ashtalakshmi Temple, Chennai
- Coordinates: 12.9926°N 80.2704°E

Architecture
- Type: Hindu architecture
- Completed: 1976
- Elevation: 46 m (151 ft)

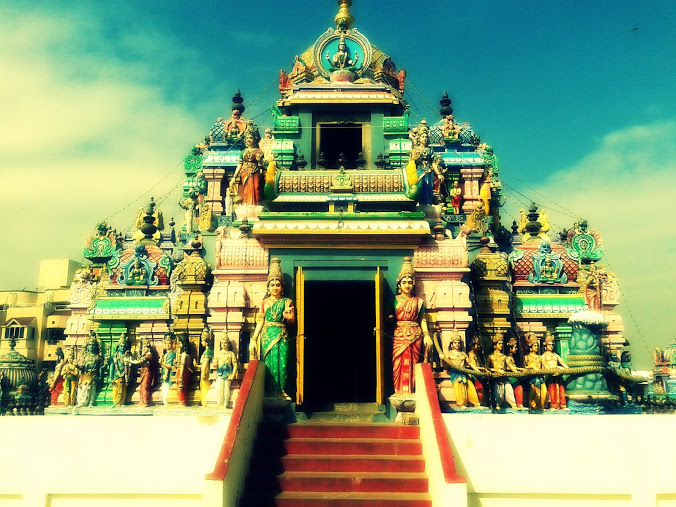
Ashtalakshmi Kovil

The Ashtalakshmi Kovil is a Hindu temple, which lies on the shorelines near the Elliot's beach, in Chennai, India. The temple is dedicated to the goddess Lakshmi, and her eight primary forms – the Ashtalakshmi – the giver of all eight forms of wealth, namely, offspring, success, prosperity, wealth, courage, bravery, food, and knowledge. The sanctorums are depicted on a multi-tier complex in such a way that visitors could visit all the shrines without stepping over any of the sanctorums.

== Construction ==
The temple was constructed on the wishes of Sri Chandrashekarendra Saraswati swamigal of Kanchi Mutt. Sri Mukkur Srinivasa Varadhachariar was the Mahatma instrumental behind fulfilling the wishes of Kanchi Periyava.The foundation was laid in January 1974 by public participation. The consecration of the temple took place on 5 April 1976 in the presence of the 44th guru of the Ahobila Mutt Vedhantha Dhesika Yatheendhra Mahadhesikan Swami.

== The temple ==
The temple measures 65 ft in length and 45 ft in breath. It is modeled after the Sundara Varadaraja Perumal temple in Uthiramerur.

In this temple, the Ashtalakshmis, the eight forms of goddess Lakshmi, are present in four levels in nine separate sanctums. The shrine of Lakshmi and her consort Vishnu is in level two. One starts the worship from here. Taking the stairs, the path leads to the third floor, which has the shrines of Santhanalakshmi, Vijayalakshmi, Vidyalakshmi and Gajalakshmi. Further few steps would lead to the shrine of Dhanalakshmi, which is the only shrine on the fourth floor. Exiting the main shrine, in the first level, there are shrines for Aadilakshmi, Dhaanya lakshmi and Dhairyalakshmi. The temple also has Dashavatara (avatars of Vishnu), Guruvayoorappan, Ganesha, Dhanvanthari and Anjaneyar deities.

== Renovation ==
In 2012, the temple was renovated at a cost of ₹ 7 million. Another ₹ 1.6 million was spent on conducting the Jeernotharana Ashtabandana mahakumbhabhishekam, a Hindu ceremony. A total of 32 kalasams were newly laid in the temple, including a gold-plated 5.5-foot-high kalasam atop the sanctum sanctorum.

== See also ==
- Religion in Chennai
