= Besant Nagar =

- Neighbourhood
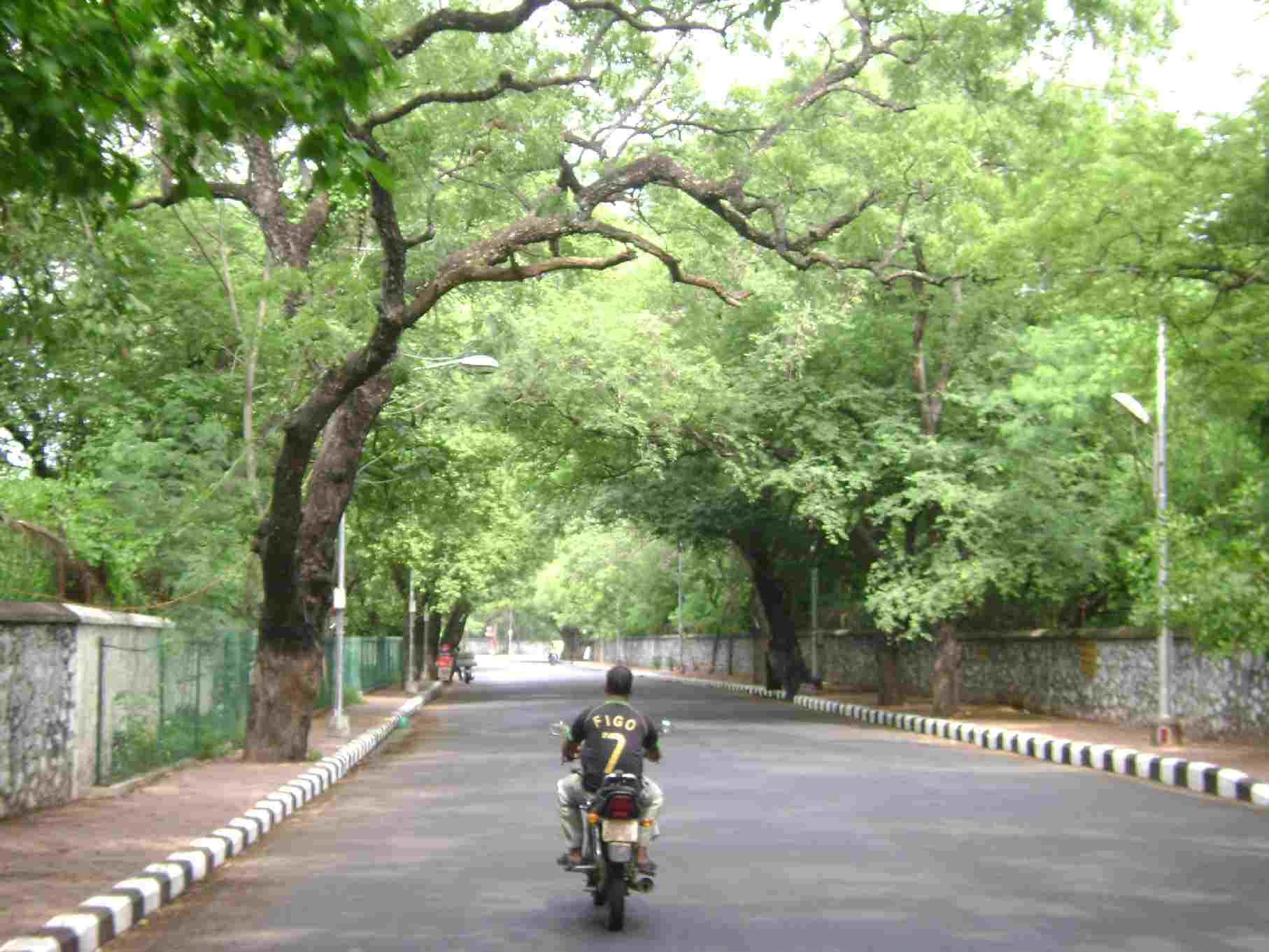
- A typical road in Besant Nagar

- Location within Chennai Location within Tamil Nadu Location within India
- Coordinates: 13.0002°N 80.2668°E
- Country: India
- State: Tamil Nadu
- District: Chennai
- Taluk: Mylapore
- Metro: Chennai
- Zone: Adyar
- Ward: 152
- Named for: Annie Besant

Languages
  - Official: Tamil
- Time zone: UTC+5:30 (IST)
- Vehicle registration: TN-07
- Lok Sabha constituency: Chennai South
- Vidhan Sabha constituency: Velachery (from 2010 Delimitation)

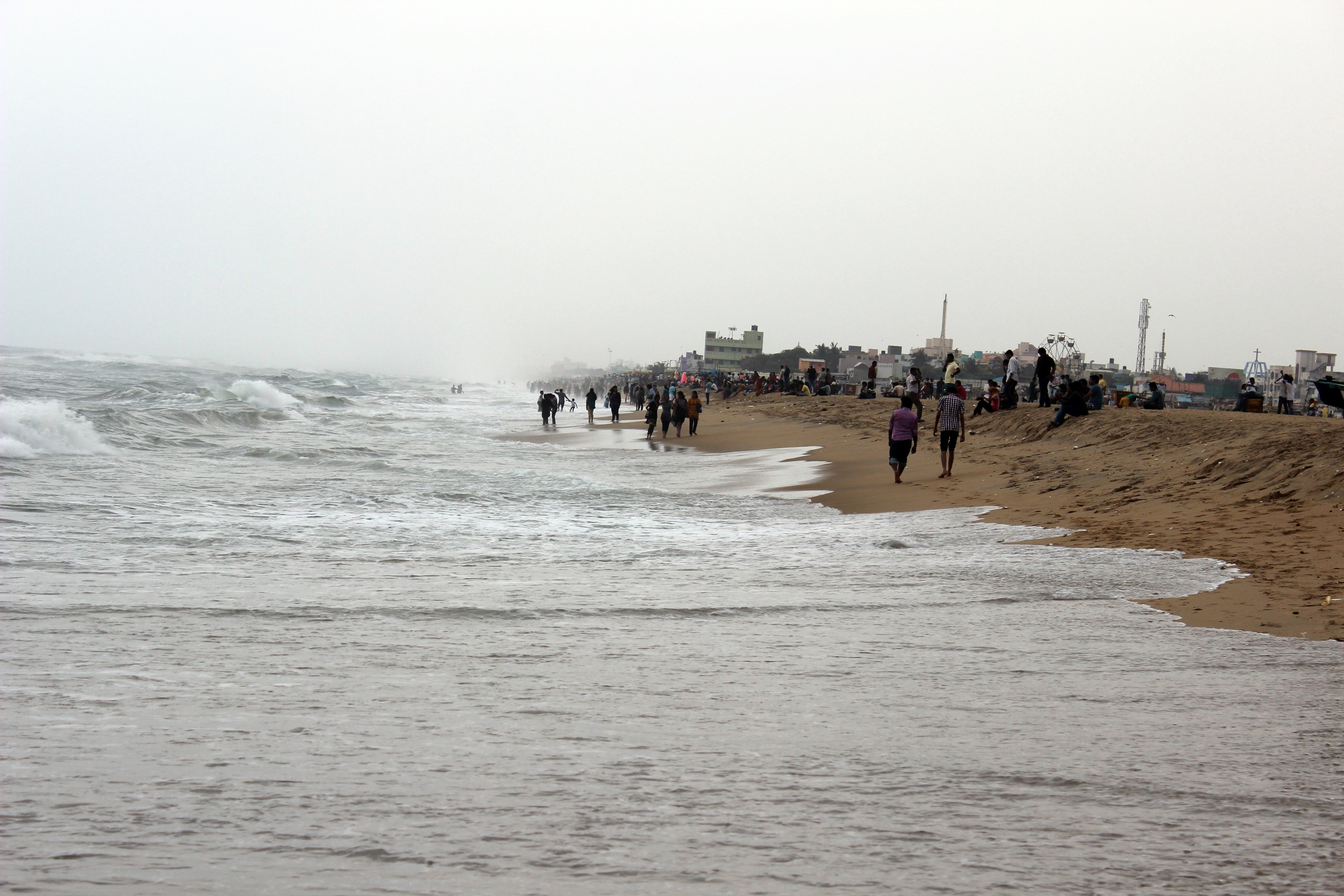
Elliott's Beach at Besant Nagar, Chennai

Besant Nagar is an upscale, exclusive residential neighbourhood in South Chennai, India. It is located along the coast of the Bay of Bengal.

The neighborhood is inhabited by a highly affluent population and has many upmarket restaurants, cafes and boutiques. It is named after Annie Besant, the first female president of the Indian National Congress in 1917. The main attraction is Elliot's Beach, named after Edward Elliot, the former Governor of Madras. It forms the end-point of the Marina Beach shore. The green spaces and beach is a spot for youngsters and elders.

== History ==
Kalakshetra Academy, the dance school started in 1936 by Rukmini Devi Arundale and her husband George Arundale and their associates at the Theosophical Society is also present in this locality. Besant Nagar was developed by Tamil Nadu Housing Board (TNHB) in the early 1970s and up to the early 1980s. It was developed in an area of about 4 sq km encompassing the surroundings of Indra Nagar and Shastri Nagar. TNHB developed residential plots, apartments, commercial complexes, wide roads, school zones, bus terminus and large parks. The Central Government Staff Quarters, popularly known as C.P.W.D. quarters, is located here and contributed to the development of the locality. Besant Nagar is also the residence of (former) World Chess Champion Viswanathan Anand.

== Besant Nagar Today ==
=== Places of worship ===
The Arulmigu Mahalakshmi Temple is located on the shores of Besant Nagar Beach. This is the only temple dedicated to Sri Mahalaksahmi, the Consort of Sriman Narayanan (Sri Mahavishnu), on the east coast in Tamil Nadu. Other notable places of worship include the Varasiddhi Vinayaka temple (inaugurated in 1977), Ashtalakshmi Kovil (1976), Arupadai Murugan Kovil (1986), Ratnagirishwarar Kovil (1968) and the Velankanni Church.

=== Educational institutions ===
The Besant Theosophical High School, The School KFI, St. John's English School & Junior College, Olcott Memorial School and Arignar Anna Government High School are some of the other schools in Besant Nagar.

The Besant Theosophical High School founded in 1934, is the oldest unit of the Kalakshetra Foundation. It's affiliated with the State Board syllabus and offers education primarily in Tamil, with the option of English.

Olcott Memorial High School (OMHS) is named after its founder Colonel Henry Steel Olcott who founded the school in 1894. The Panchama Free School as it was then called, it was founded to provide schooling access to the children of the fifth caste who were denied access to the regular schools.

The School, KFI has been functioning on leased premises of The Theosophical Society since 1979. The school will shift to a new location and continue its valuable educational work with the help and support of parents, alumni and well-wishers of the school. The new residential Krishnamurti school, Pathashaala, near Chennai commenced in August 2010.

Shiv Nadar School, Chennai has also come up in Besant Nagar- it has commenced its academic journey from June 2023 onwards to children from Nursery to Grade 4 for now. Shiv Nadar Foundation has announced the launch of a K-12 (from kindergarten to 12th grade) school chain in Chennai- Shiv Nadar School. The academic session for Nursery to Grade 4 will begin from June 2023 onwards. Around 150 students will be enrolled in the first year of operations, the school plans on increasing admissions every year.

The school campus spans across 14-acres of land in the Damodar Gardens located near the Elliot's beach. The school will have separate block for the junior, middle, and senior school students. The students will be able to avail facilities like state-of-the-art science lab, play area, multi-purpose indoor sports complex, sports field for athletics a dining hall, an auditorium, a swimming pool and a playground among others. The entire campus will be ready by 2024.

Arignar Anna Govt Higher Secondary School is an English medium school. The school was founded in the year 1964 and it is affiliated with the State board. The school is a Co-educational school and it has classes from 6 to 12. The School does not have a pre-primary section.

St. John's English School & Junior College also shortly known as St. John's Besant Nagar is a CBSE affiliated higher secondary school in Besant Nagar, Chennai. The school was established in 1981. It caters to the age group 2 years to 18 years - from classes Pre-KG to XII, with a total strength of 2,500 students.

=== Other institutions ===
The Rajaji Bhavan building housing many Central Government offices greets you as you enter Besant Nagar. It also houses a Railway Booking counter for the convenience of the residents of the locality as well as for the other areas around Besant nagar.

Besant Nagar is an excellent example of organized government town planning by Tamil Nadu Housing Board (TNHB). Originally a quiet residential area, the popularity of the nearby Elliot's beach has led to a steady increase in traffic and commercial activities.

The Reserve Bank of India staff quarters, The CPWD Quarters housing the officials of various Central Government departments, The Customs Colony, The Government Officials Cooperative Housing Society residences, and the TNHB housing buildings all laid out in neat fashion, along with modern individual residential buildings all add charm and order to the locality.

The beach and the 6th avenue are the venue for many events like the Vintage Car Rally, Half Marathons, the Army Band, Musical and Promotional events, Food Carnivals and many more.

In October 2015, The Hindu publication introduced the concept of a Car Free Sunday along the beach promenade in order to connect with the local community. This event is inspired by Ciclovía in Bogota, Colombia. In the past year, the Car Free Sunday has become a meeting place for families to walk along the beach, do joint sessions of Zumba, yoga, engage in sport, sing, have a fitness tryout while the kids can cycle, play local, traditional games right on the street, without the hassle and noise of traffic and vehicles.

To the North East is the Fishermen village of Urur Kuppam and to the South East is a Fishermen hamlet near the Velankanni Church.

This area is bound fully on the east by the Bay of Bengal (Elliots Beach), on the South by the Kalakshetra Campus, on the North by the Theosophical Society and its sprawling forested green campus ( with the Adyar Estuaries still further to its North) that except through the Besant Avenue in the North-West, the approach from Shastri nagar in the west as two points, there is no chance of traffic congestion.

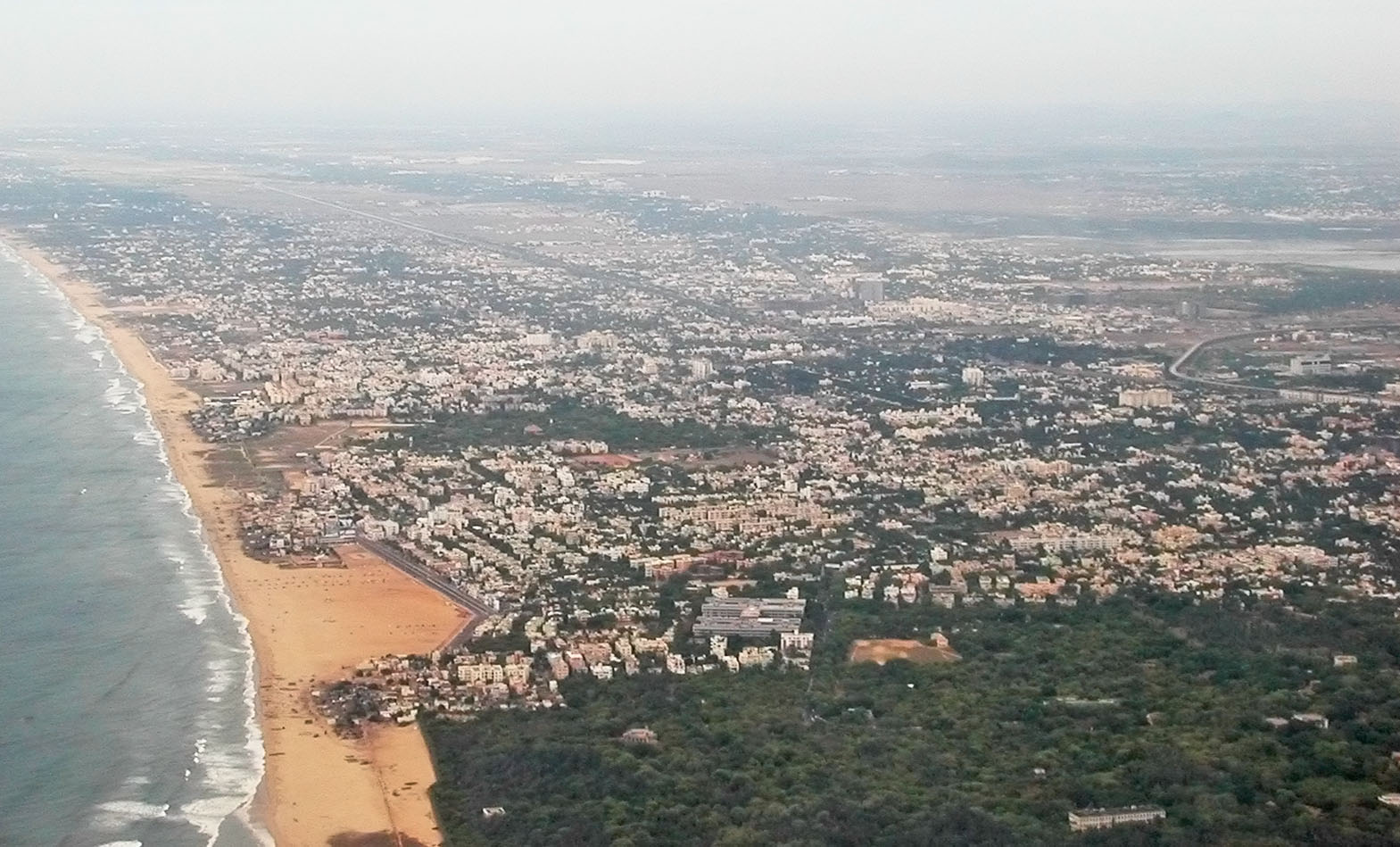
An aerial view of Besant Nagar and Elliots beach

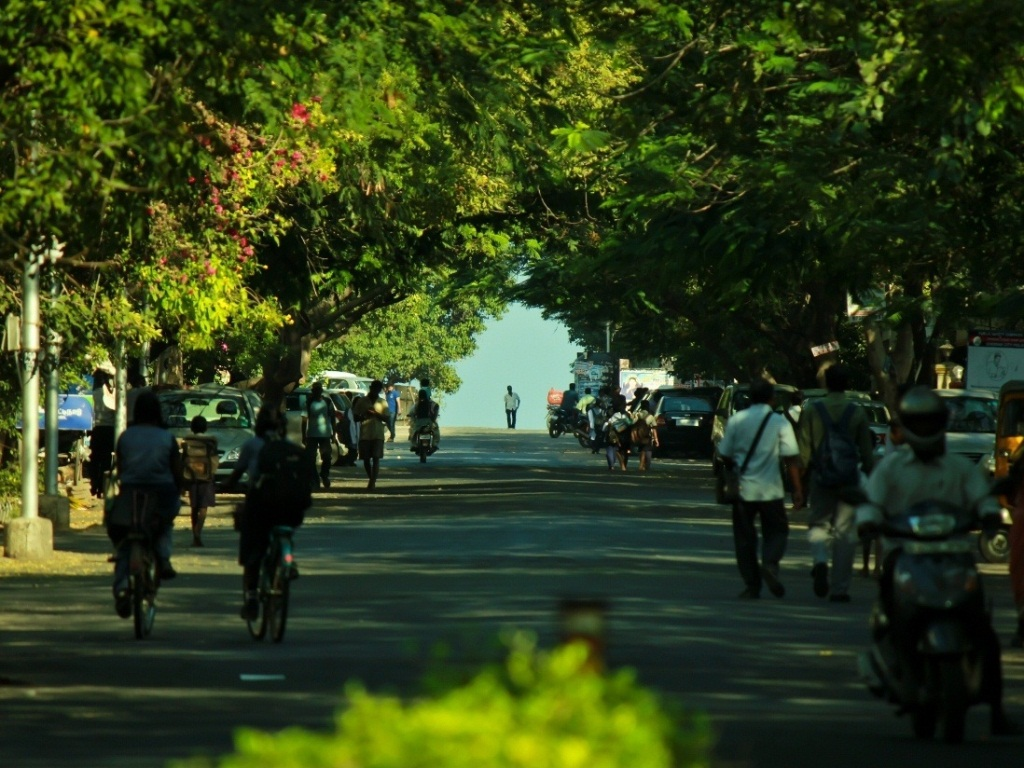
Besant Nagar 5th Avenue

== Bus depot ==
The Besant Nagar bus terminal is used by 85 different buses making 500 trips every day. Around 4,000 people use the terminal every day.

In October 2012, the Metropolitan Transport Corporation (MTC) decided to convert the Besant Nagar bus terminal into a depot. The depot will be 70 percent larger than the terminal. The depot is being built at a cost of ₹ 5 million and is expected to be completed in less than a year. In 2020 Besant nagar bus depot was defunct and merge with the MTC region Adyar bus depot.
