= Edward Elliot (judge) =

Edward Francis Elliot (died 11 June 1866) was a judge and the second son of Hugh Elliot, the Governor of Madras from 1814 to 1820. He is remembered largely for his affair with Isabella Napier, the wife of Colonel Johnstone Napier that created a sensational scandal in colonial Madras.
