= Adyar =

Adyar or Adayar may refer to:

- Adyar, Bhandara, a small town in Maharashtra, India
- Adyar, Chennai, a locality of Chennai, Tamil Nadu, India
  - Battle of Adyar, October 1746
  - Adyar River, a river in Chennai city
    - Adyar Creek
      - Adyar Eco Park (also known as Tholkappia Poonga), an ecological park set up in the Adyar estuary area
  - Adyar Ananda Bhavan, Indian vegetarian restaurant chain
  - Adyar Cancer Institute
  - Adyar Film Institute
  - Adyar Gate, another name of ITC Sheraton Park hotel & Towers in Chennai
  - Adyar Kamakshi Temple
  - Adyar Library
  - Theosophical Society Adyar, an international occult organisation headquartered in Adyar, Chennai
- Adyar, Karnataka, a town in Karnataka, India
- Adayar (horse), an Irish-bred Thoroughbred racehorse
- Adyar K. Lakshman, Indian dancer and choreographer
