= Tholkappia Poonga =

Ecological park in Chennai, India

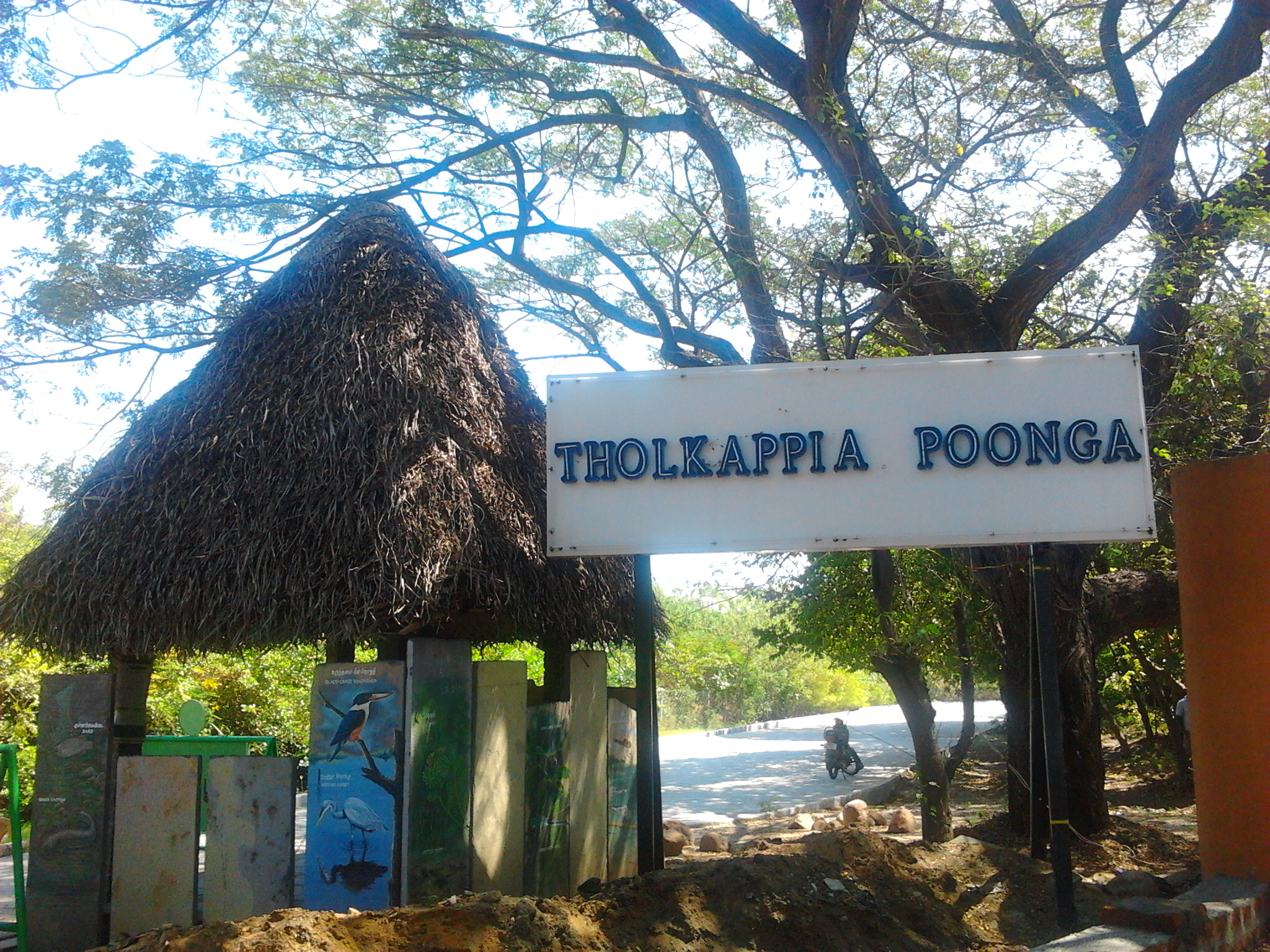
- Adyar Poonga front
- Interactive map of Tholkappia Poonga
- Type: Urban park
- Location: Adyar in Chennai, India
- Coordinates: 13.0193°N 80.2647°E
- Area: 358 acres (145 hectares)
- Created: 2011
- Operator: Chennai River Restoration Trust
- Status: Open all year

Tholkappia Poonga or Adyar Eco Park (also known as Adyar Poonga) is an ecological park set up by the Government of Tamil Nadu in the Adyar estuary area of Chennai, India. According to the government, the project, conceived based on the master plan for the restoration of the vegetation of the freshwater ecosystems of the Coromandel Coast, especially the fragile ecosystem of the Adyar estuary and creek, was expected to cost around ₹ 1,000 million which will include the beautification of 358 acres (1.45 square kilometres) of land. The park's ecosystem consists of tropical dense evergreen forest, predominantly comprising trees and shrubs that have thick dark green foliage throughout the year, with over 160 woody species, and comprises six vegetative elements such as trees, shrubs, lianas, epiphytes, herbs and tuberous species. The park was opened to public by Chief Minister M. Karunanidhi on 22 January 2011 and named after the renowned Tamil scholar Tholkappiar. About 65 percent of the park is covered by water and artefacts and signages. In the first 2 months of its inauguration, nearly 4,000 children from several schools in the city and the nearby Kancheepuram and Tiruvallur districts have visited the park to learn about wetland conservation, eco-restoration and water management. While the first phase of the ecopark covered about 4.16 acres of CRZ-III area, the entire area covered under the second phase falls under this category.

== Geography ==
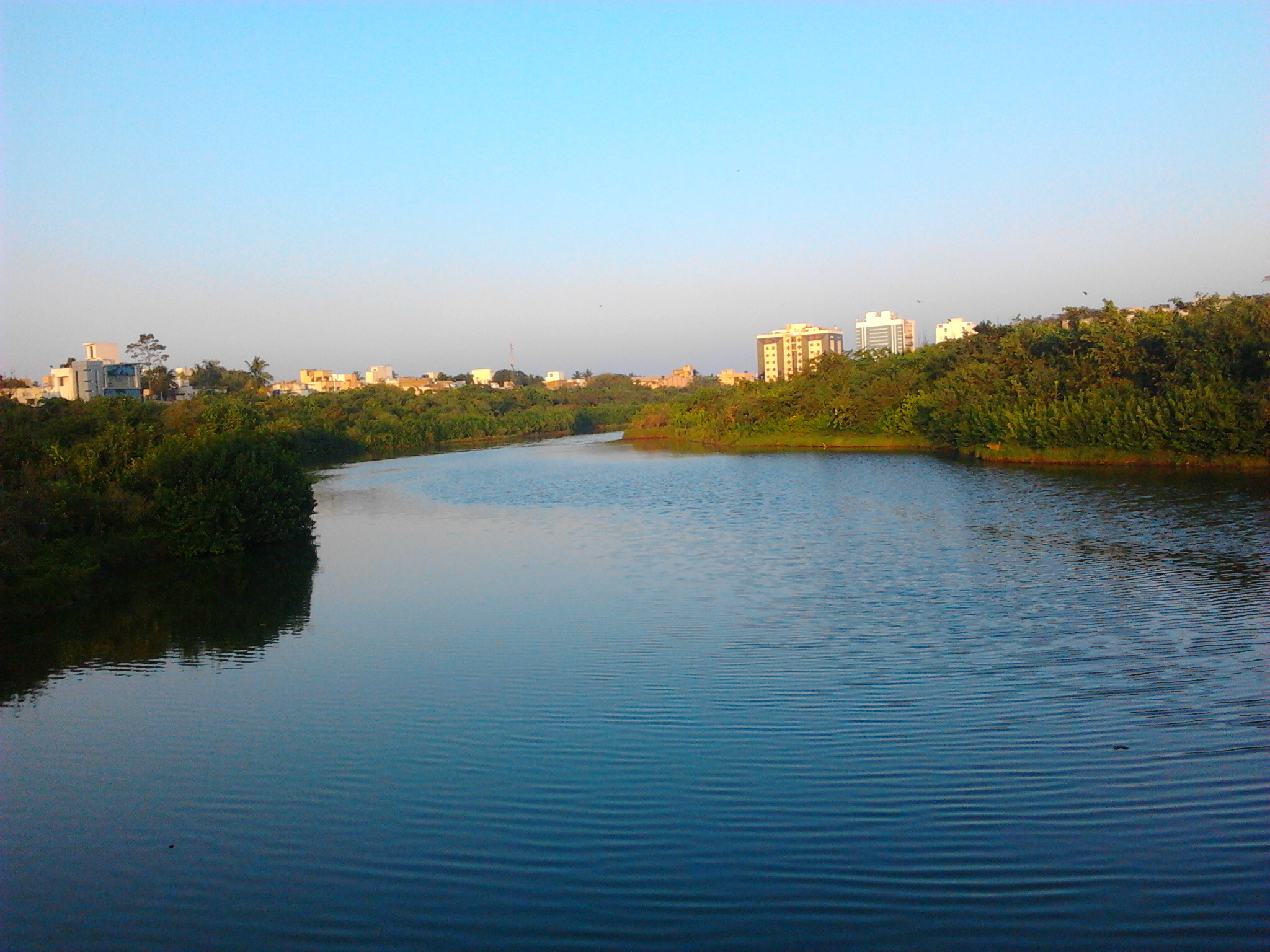
The creek surrounds the Quibble Island, stopping short of completely encircling it

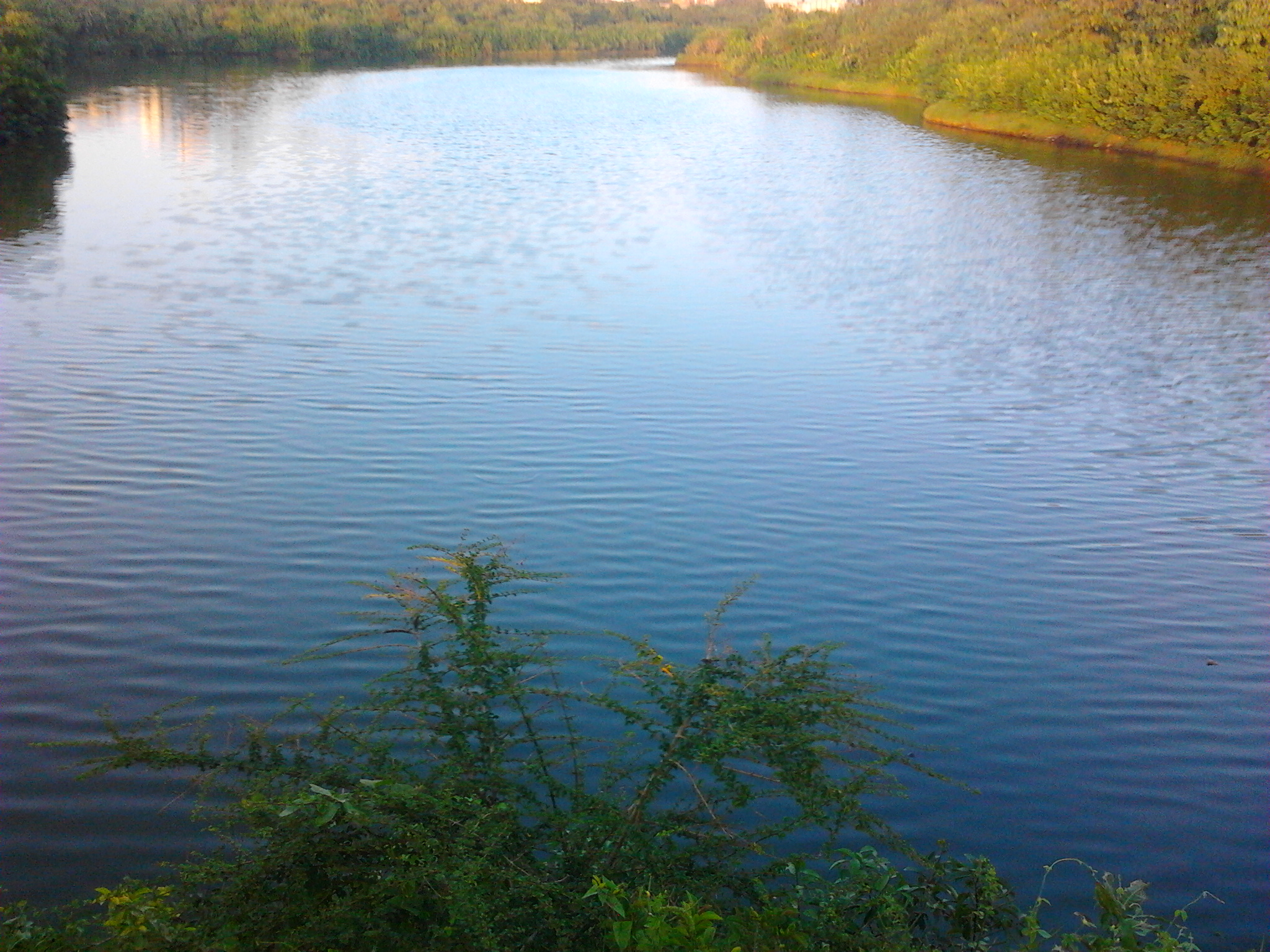
Before joining the sea, a part of the river forms a tidal creek

The Adyar river originates from Malaipattu tank near Manimangalam village in Sriperumbudur Taluk at about 15 km west of Tambaram and gains momentum as a stream from Chembarambakkam lake. It runs through Chennai for 42 km before draining into the Bay of Bengal, forming an estuary, which extends from the Adyar Bridge to the sandbar at the edge of the sea, with some small islets in-between. Just before joining the sea at a sand bar on the shore, one part of the river takes off northward beyond the Chettinad Palace as a small inlet of water forming a tidal creek. The creek takes a U-turn near Foreshore Estate. It surrounds what was formerly called Quibble Island, stopping short of completely encircling it. The estuary covers an area of about 300 acres. The low salinity, good shelters, calm conditions and high plankton availability in the creek serves as a good nursery for fish. The flow of tidal water in and out of the creek allowed for easy travel of boats. It therefore encouraged fishing and there was a thriving economy of fish trade here. However, with the city's sewage and effluence from its various industries, for some time, emptying into the river, the biological activities in the region was affected.

The Adyar wetland reserve is a significant link for birds on their great annual migrations, particularly the wading birds which feed on the coastal mudflats. Historically, approximately 200 species of migratory birds visited the Adyar Creek region but many are now on the endangered IUCN Red List. The restoration of this coastal wetland ecosystem will encourage many of these species to return.

== Early phase ==
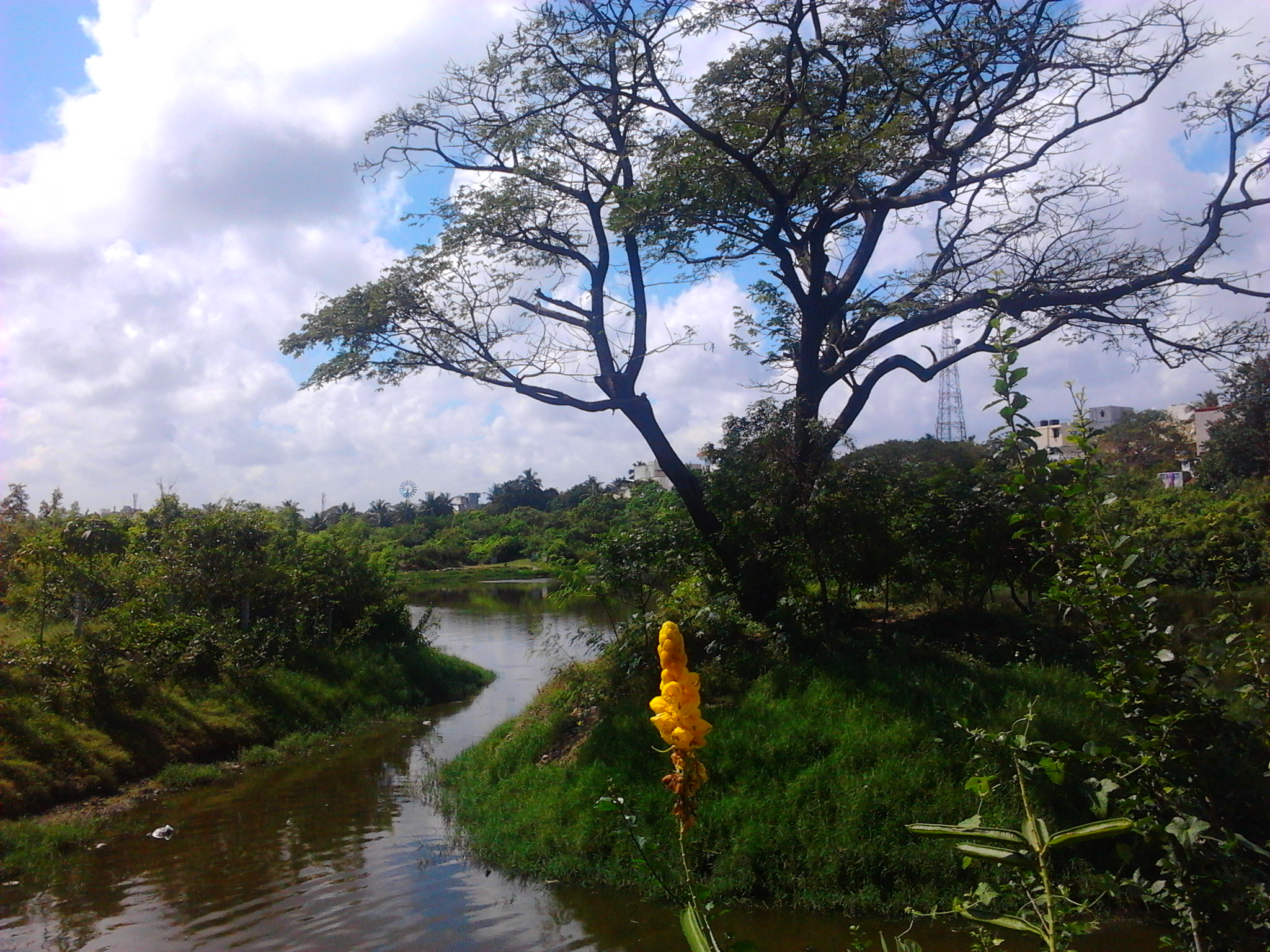
Many small inlets form part of the tidal creek across the eco-park

An estimated not more than 500 acres of undisturbed tropical dry evergreen forest remains in Tamil Nadu and the eco-park, aiming at the restoration of more than 350 acres, serves as a significant conservation effort to bring this vegetation back to the Coromandel coast. Owing to uncontrolled exploitation of the wetland due to urbanisation, the region became a degraded area by the end of the 20th century. When the Ambedkar Memorial was constructed, the damage to the ecosystem was challenged by the Citizen, consumer and civil Action Group (CAG) in the court. In 2000, the High Court directed the state government to preserve the wetlands. On 22 December 2003, the State Government handed over 58 acres of the area to the Corporation of Chennai to develop it into an eco park modelled on Parque Texozomoc of Mexico. The eco-park was conceptualised by M. P. Vijayakumar, the then commissioner of the Chennai Corporation, in 2004. The budget of ₹ 600 million for creating the park was passed in 2005 and Adyar Creek Eco Park Limited, a special purpose vehicle, was set up to harness and channel the funds for development. In a bid to take up ecological restoration of the Adyar estuary, the Tamil Nadu Government constituted the Adyar Poonga Trust in October 2006. The Trust was set up with the Chief Secretary as the chairman and Secretaries of Highways, Forests, Fisheries, Municipal Administration & Water Supply, and Finance as members. However, the CAG was never made part of the body. The work of preparing an ecological restoration plan was entrusted with Pitchandikulam Forest Consultants of Auroville in February 2007. The ecological restoration aimed at an eco-park that will be a showcase ecosystem of the Coromandel Coast with fresh water ponds, brackish areas, mangroves, mud flats, dunes, and islands.

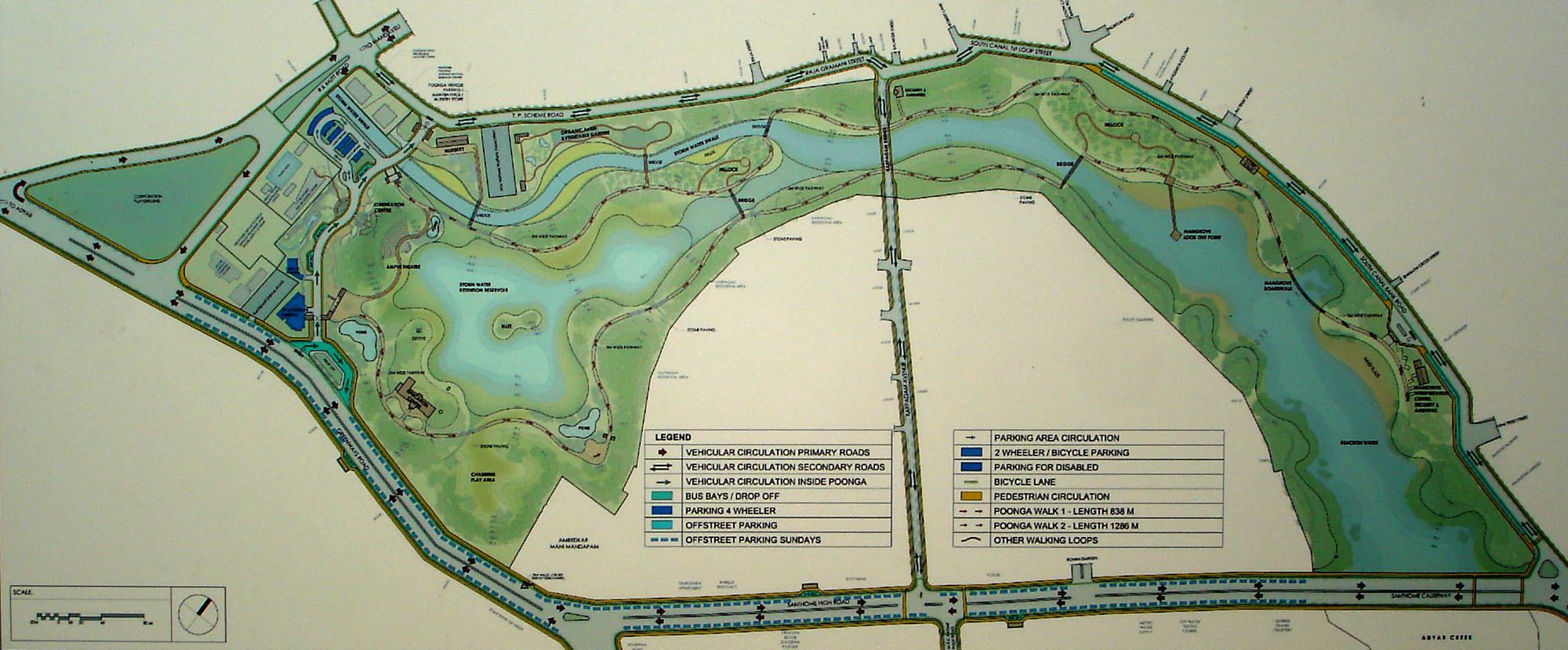
Master plan of the eco-park

The improvement did not begin until clearance in June 2004. Once completed, it is claimed to become the first eco-tourism venture in the state. A major portion of the boundary wall for the park was built by the Chennai Corporation in 2006 at a cost of ₹ 15 million, while the remaining improvements could not be carried out owing to encroachments on the land. The area before restoration used to be a filthy place, with debris strewn around. Cattle was being reared by neighbouring slum dwellers and antisocials made merry in the area that was full of thickets. Initial assessment of the creek area was, in fact, done from the nearby high-rise structures because no one could enter the park. Following action by the civic body, the squatters of Rajah Gramani Thottam were removed and allotted to Slum Clearance Board tenements in Semmencherry in early July 2007. The issue was also taken up by the members of the Corporation Council. As a result, the remaining portion of compound wall was made higher.

== The Chennai Rivers Restoration Trust ==
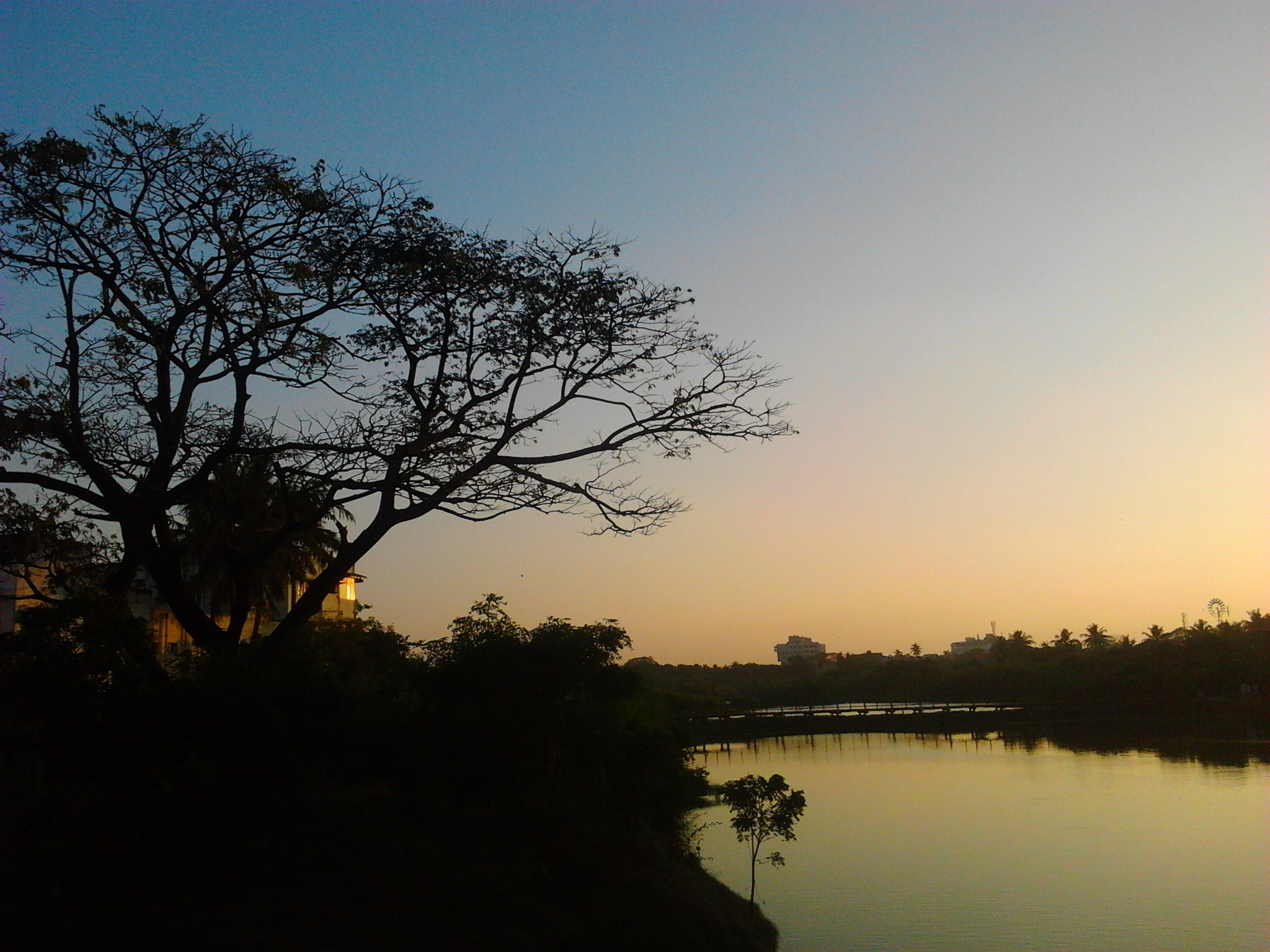
The waterbody as seen from Karpagam Bridge, Karpagam Avenue

Tamil Nadu Urban Infrastructure Financial Services Limited has been charged with engaging consultants to develop a master plan and invite bidders for development of the park. The Adyar Creek Trust has been set up by the government of Tamil Nadu to co-ordinate the execution of the project. The Adyar Poonga Trust has been rechristened as Chennai Rivers Restoration Trust (CRRT). The Chief Secretary to the Government of Tamil Nadu is the chairman for the trust and the secretaries in the Finance Department, Municipal Administration and Water Supplies, Highways Department, Public Works Department, Environment and Forest Department, and the Commissioner, Corporation of Chennai are the trustees.

M. Karunanidhi, the then chief minister of Tamil Nadu, laid the foundation stone for the project in August 2007.

== Phase I ==
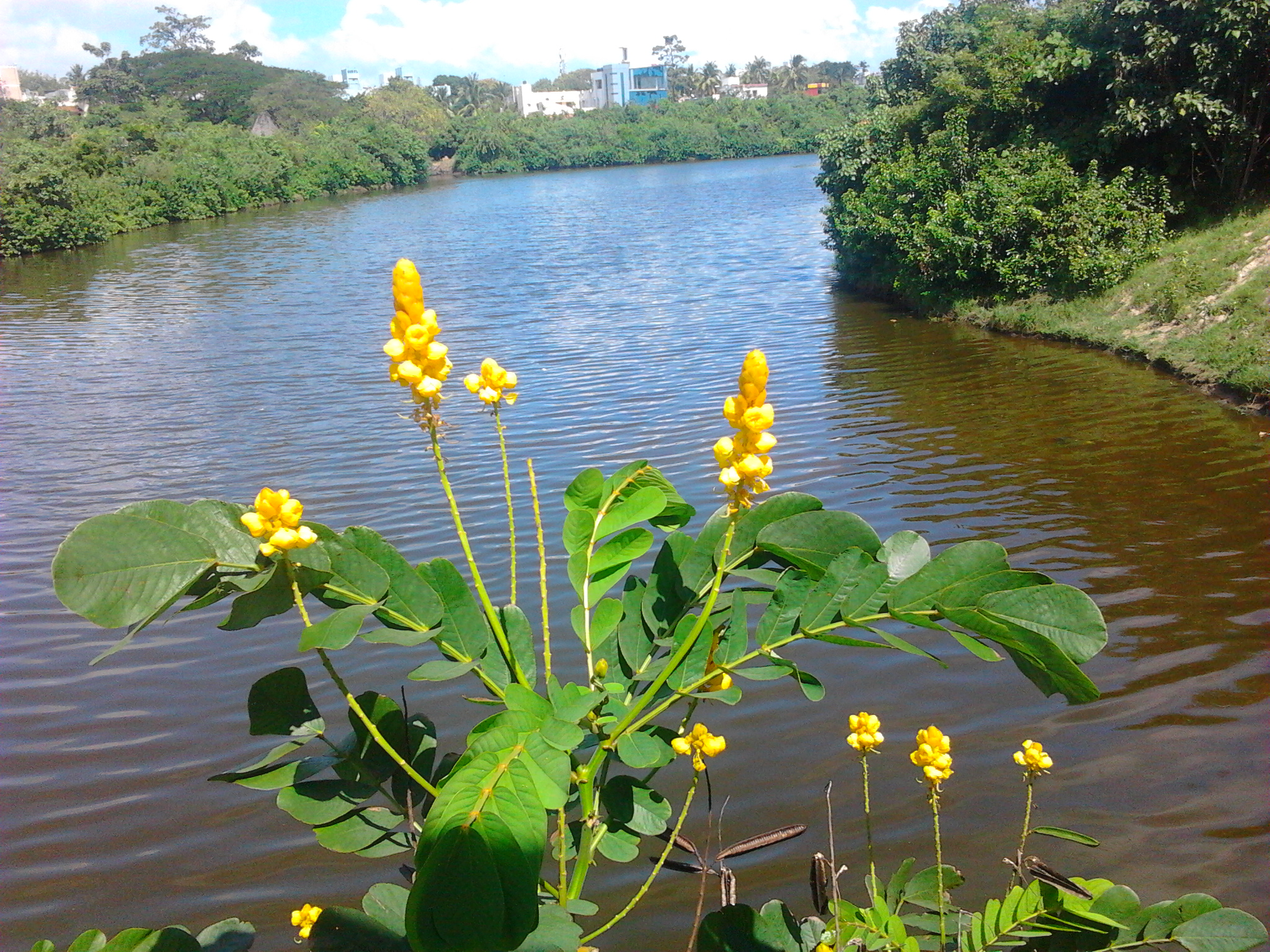
About 172 endemic species of plants were planted in the park to serve as habitat for aquatic, terrestrial and arboreal species

Pitchandikulam Forest Consultants are the lead consultants in the ecological restoration of 58-acres of the Adyar Creek estuary. As part of the master plan for the restoration of the creek area, a 40-m causeway connecting Karpagam Avenue near Greenways Road with Mandaveli was demolished and was replaced by a wooden bridge 40-m long and 3-m wide. Along South Canal Bank Road, a mangrove forest has been created, as the soil is well suited for such growth. In the first phase of the ecological restoration plan which covers 58 acres costing ₹ 230 million, more than 91,280 varieties of saplings of 172 endemic species of trees, herbs, shrubs, reeds and tuberous plants were planted to serve as habitat for aquatic, terrestrial and arboreal species, chiefly at locations such as the entrance plaza, swale area near Town Planning Scheme Road, the rear side of Ambedkar Manimandapam and along Santhome entrance plaza, lakes were desilted, and a play area for children was created. About 37,600 reeds have been planted along the water margins.

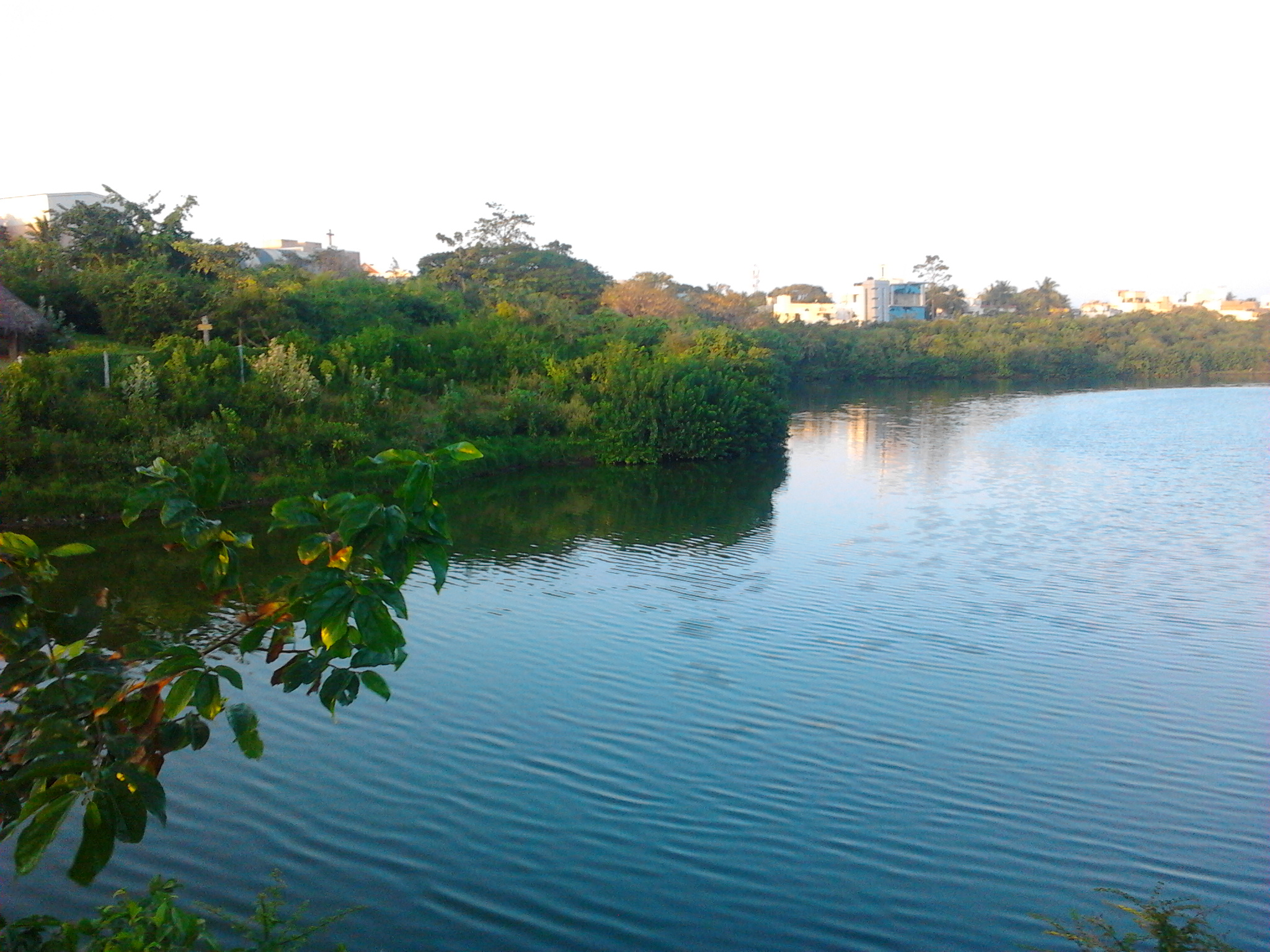
The water quality has improved since the creation of the eco-park

Development works include land development (including excavation), construction of visitors' orientation area, three wooden bridges and a steel bridge for sightseers, a green centre, nursery building, children's interactive learning centre, environmental education centre, bamboo pavilions, signages and exhibits. The green centre has been planned in the erstwhile fisheries building near Ramakrishna Mutt Road. An audio visual room, environmental education centre, library to document creek activities, laboratory to check water quality, a souvenir shop, coffee corner, all form part of the centre. The CRRT had to excavate 150,000 tonnes of construction debris and garbage from the site to create a water body embellished with earthen pathways, wooden bridges, signage and bamboo pavilions. A total of 266,000 cubic metres of earth was removed from the site to create a park. The Phase I of the park has 136,560 plants of 172 indigenous species with about 1,000 name boards with inscriptions of the botanical names. It also includes solar-powered lights, seven water tanks, PVC pipes for a length of 3,100 m, and roads and pathways stretching 4 km on the 58-acre campus. The environmental clearance for the Adyar Poonga was obtained from the Union ministry of environment and forests in mid-January 2011. The park was opened to public on 22 January 2011. One fourth of the 58-acre park would be the conservation zone to which public would have no access. A ticket plaza has been built near Brodies Castle Road.

About 4.16 acres of Phase I development has been categorised as Coastal Regulatory Zone (CRZ) III. The Phase I consists chiefly of wetland habitat with 70 percent water. A number of stormwater drains carrying water to the Adyar River are being diverted by the Chennai Corporation for better recharge of water in the eco-park. The new inlets of the drain would pass through South Canal Bank Road, Rohini Garden and Karpagam Avenue. These will be in addition to existing stormwater drain inlets along roads such as R. K. Mutt Road.

== Phase II ==
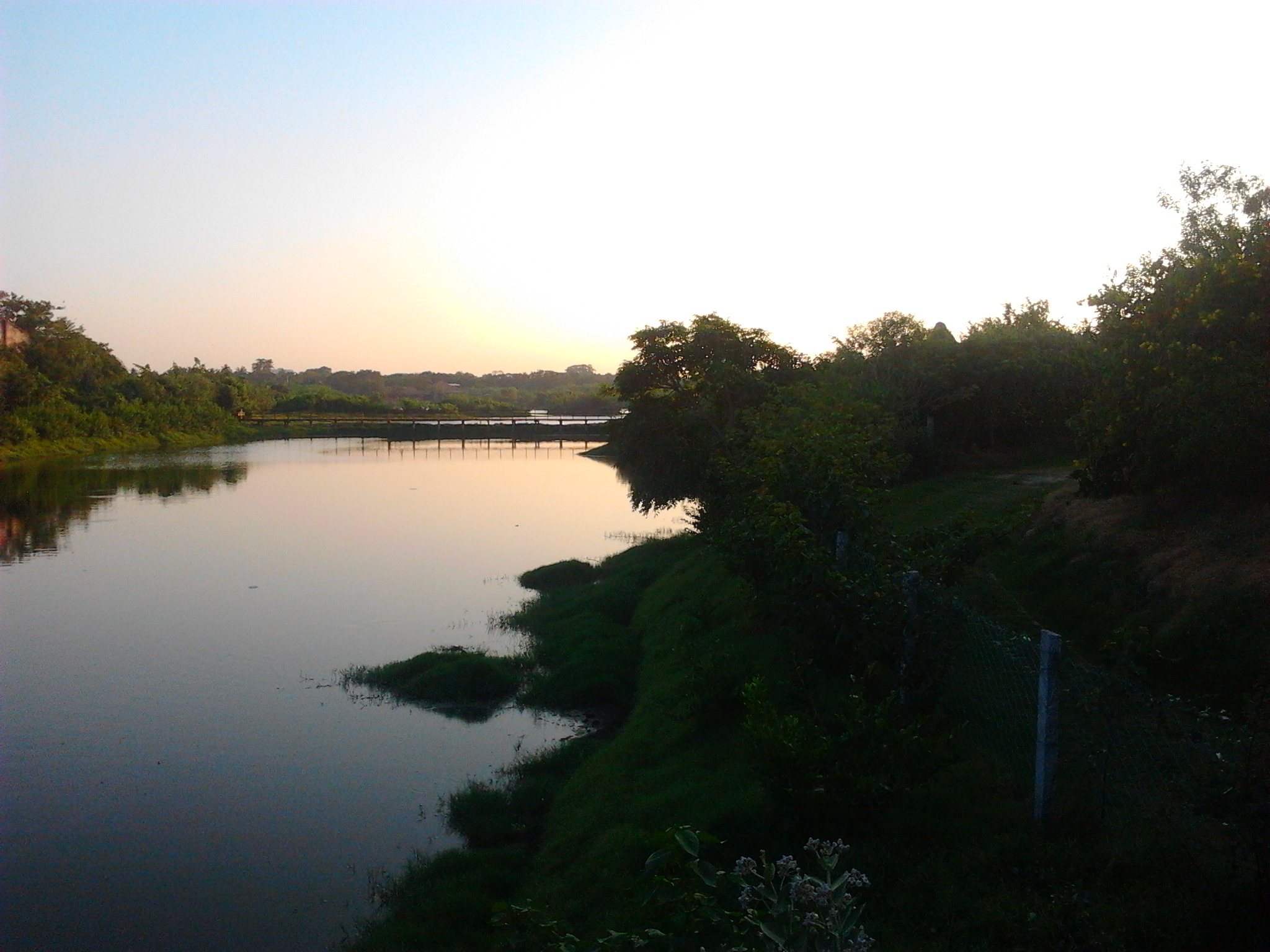
Phase II of the development includes stabilisation of bunds, river banks, creek and small islands

The second phase of the project covers ecological restoration of about 300 acres of Adyar River estuary between Theosophical Society and Srinivasapuram and includes habitat restoration, monitoring pathways, sanitation, solid waste management and measures to enhance tidal influx in Adyar estuary and creek. The plan for the second phase had been prepared and work started in January 2011, on the day of inauguration of the first phase of the park. Work on the phase is estimated to cost ₹ 189.3 million. The CRRT plans to make an application seeking permission from the State Coastal Zone Management Authority for commencing the second phase of the Adyar Poonga. The area covered under the second phase falls under CRZ III category. The authority would examine the project proposed in the CRZ area and give its recommendations for it to be referred to the government.

The second phase would mainly involve water body restoration. About 100,000 saplings belonging to 24 mangrove species such as Avicennia marina, Acanthus ilicifolius, and Rizhophora mucronata and mangrove associates such as barringtonia and pongamia will be planted.

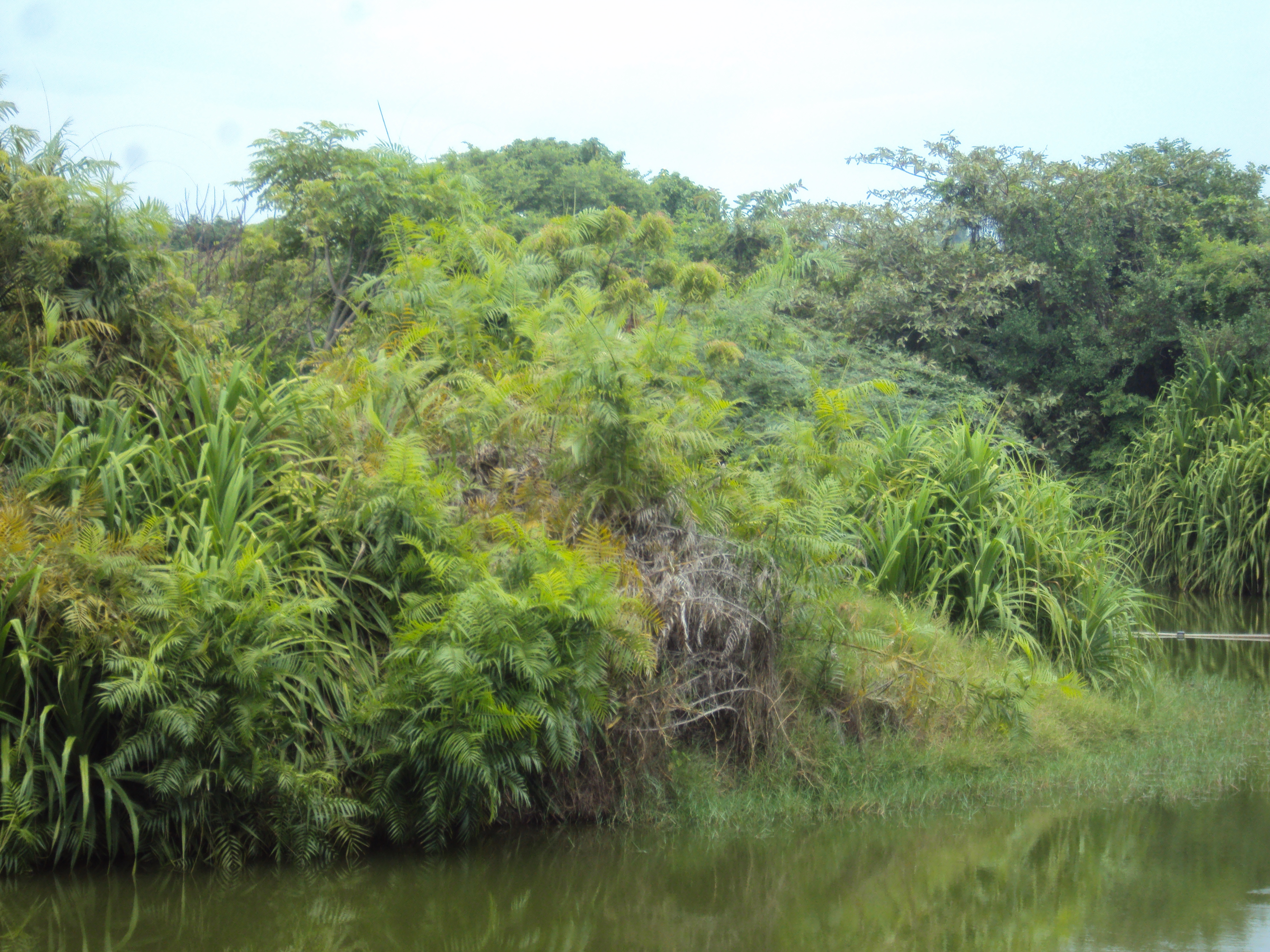
Naturally grown vegetation at the Eco Park

On getting approval for the second phase from the government, cleaning of the stretch between the Kotturpuram bridge and Greenways Road would commence with the active participation of the Chennai Corporation and Chennai Metrowater. Work on restoration of flora between Thiru Vi Ka Bridge and Santhome Causeway would also be taken up. Removal of Prosopis, an exotic species, from the eco-park would be carried out as part of this phase of the project. Rhizophora and Avicennia species would be planted in the area instead. Stabilisation of bunds, river banks, creek and small islands in the area would form part of Phase II. The project would also restore the normal tidal inflow into the creek and estuary and make the place a haven for more species of aquatic birds. After completion of the second phase, residents are likely to be allowed there for morning walks.

There are proposals to enlarge the culverts below Santhome Causeway to allow passage of water in and out of the creek. Mangrove plantations will also come up along the river to the Thiru Vi Ka Bridge in Adyar. Plans to restore the old Elphinstone Bridge adjacent the Thiru Vi Ka Bridge by setting up a bird-watching spot along with a garden are part of the Phase II of the restoration.

== Flora and fauna ==
Although around 200 species of birds have been reported in the creek area in the past, several of these had vanished from the vicinity because of rapid urbanisation.

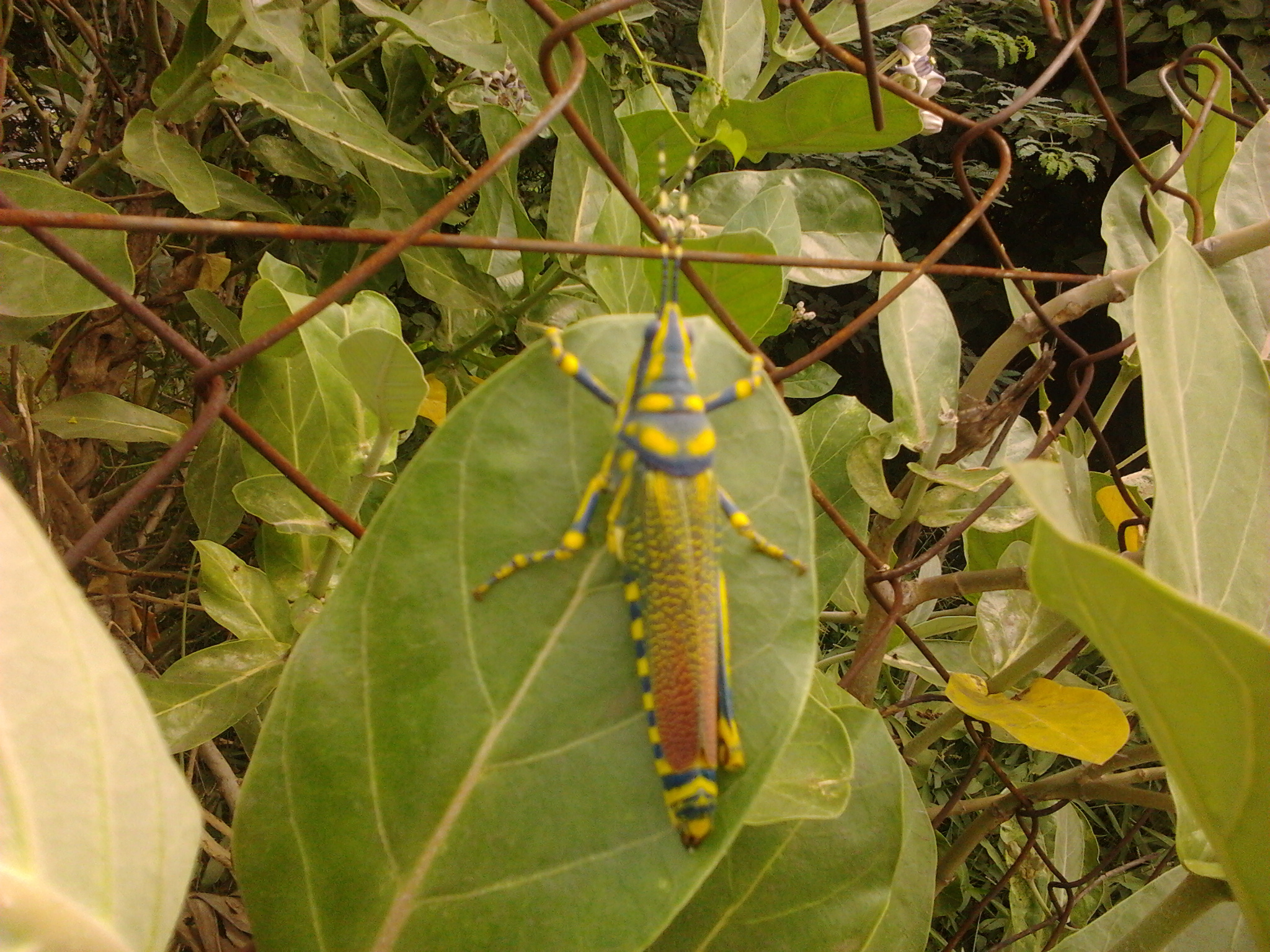
A locust spotted near the water body

A total of 143 species of fish, amphibians, birds and reptiles have been seen in the park and the number is expected to go up to 200 once the project is completed. More than 85 different kinds of birds, including rare black bittern, cinnamon bittern, black-winged kite, white-bellied sea eagle, pied kingfisher, yellow wagtails, egret, chestnut-winged cuckoo, and black-winged stilt have been spotted by ornithologists in the green expanse. After the northeast monsoon of 2011, painted storks were spotted in the area after a gap of several years. Butterflies such as common mormon, lemon pansy, the rare painted lady and black rajah, moths such as idaea, emerald moth and oleander hawk moth, and dragonflies such as the blue-tailed green darner have been spotted here. Crows, mynahs, blue rock pigeons and water paddybirds walk on the sand near the waterbodies. Non-poisonous snakes, soft and hard shell turtles, painted frogs and green pond frogs can also be seen in the park. The restoration has also improved the quality of water, which according to Central Pollution Control Board norms, is suitable for propagation of wildlife.

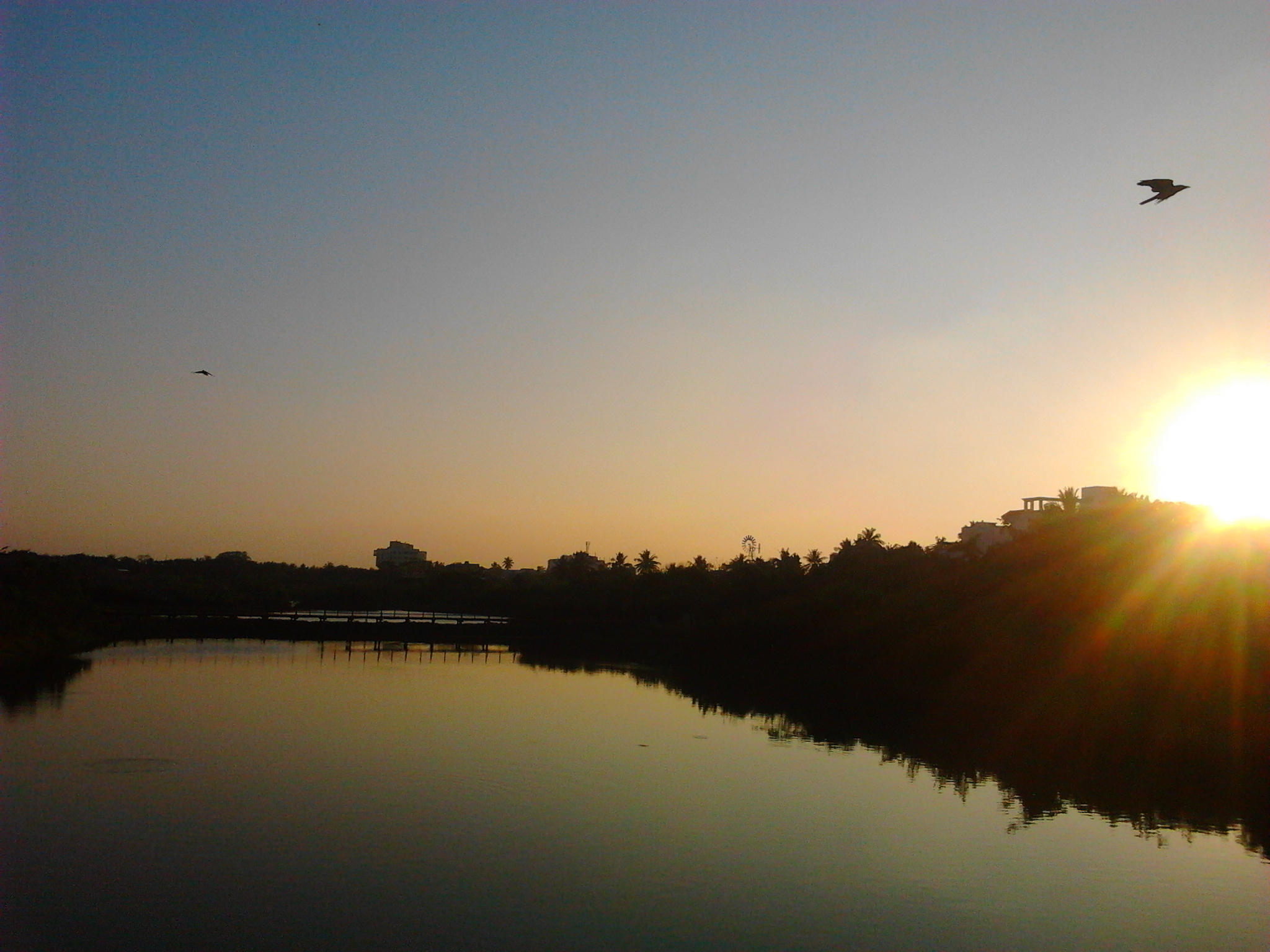
The water body of the eco-park at dusk

Other species spotted in the vicinity after restoration include mammals such as grey mongoose and Indian flying fox, reptiles such as common Indian bronzeback and saw-scaled viper, amphibians such as flapshell turtle, Indian painted frog, skipper frog, common Indian toad, green frog (a protected species under schedule 1) and the soft-shelled turtle (also an endangered species), fishes such as Indian shortfin eel, spotted snakehead, and flathead mullet. Around 10 species of mammals, 90 species of birds, 25 species of reptiles and amphibians, 56 species of butterflies, 20 different dragonflies and 30 species of fish have been identified so far.

The number of species of birds in the park has increased from 33 in 2007 to 90 in 2010 and to 120 in 2019. Reptiles have increased from 14 in 2007 to 29 in 2010. Ambhibians have increased from three in 2007 to 10 in 2010.

== Civic initiatives ==
An organisation named 'Friends of Adyar Poonga', with about 40 members, has been started as an initiative to promote environment conservation. The organisation is aiming at helping in creating environmental awareness in local schools. The members meet every second Saturday of the month inside the park.

== Visitor information ==
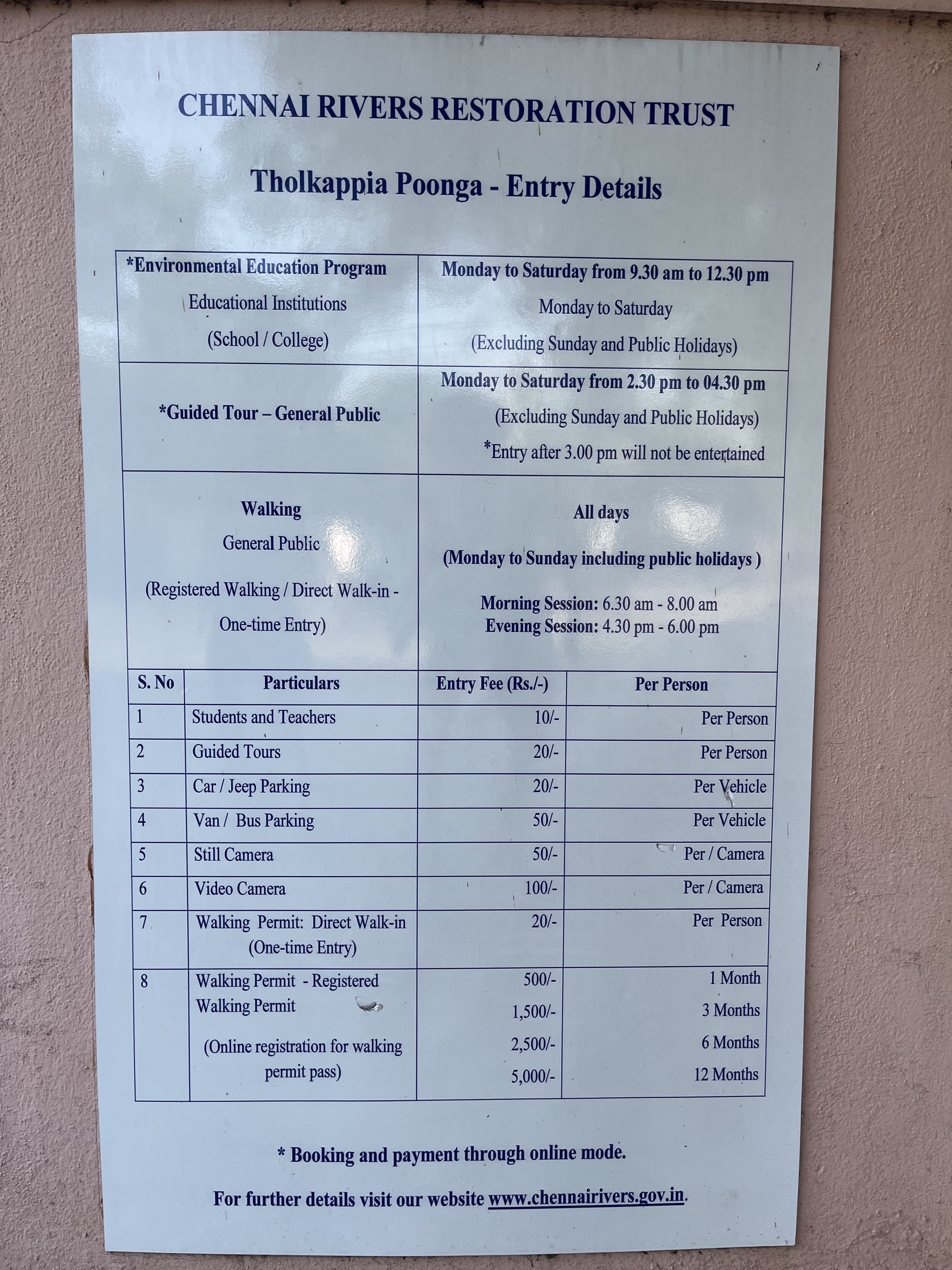
Tholkappia Poonga Entry Time and Fee Details as of 1 October 2023

Given the fragile ecology of the park, the monitoring committee appointed by the Madras High Court had recommended minimum human interference in the park, which is presently intended to serve as a centre for environmental education as well as research activities. As of 1 October 2023, the park is open to the public with limited access in the morning and evening from 6:30 am to 8:30 am and 4:30 pm to 6:00 pm. Guided tours are available in the afternoon from 2.30 pm to 4.30 pm, excluding Sundays and public holidays. The park is also open for students from 9.30 am to 12.30 pm, excluding Sundays and public holidays.

Entry Costs
| Entry Particulars | Cost |
|---|---|
| Students and Teachers | 10₹ per person |
| Park Entry | 20₹ per person |
| Guided Tours | 20₹ per person |
| Car Parking | 20₹ per vehicle |
| Van / Bus Parking | 50₹ per vehicle |
| Still Camera | 50₹ per camera |
| Video Camera | 100₹ per camera |
| Monthly pass | 500₹ per person |
| 3 month pass | 1500₹ per person |
| 6 month pass | 2500₹ per person |
| 12 month pass | 5000₹ per person |

== Species spotted at the Poonga ==
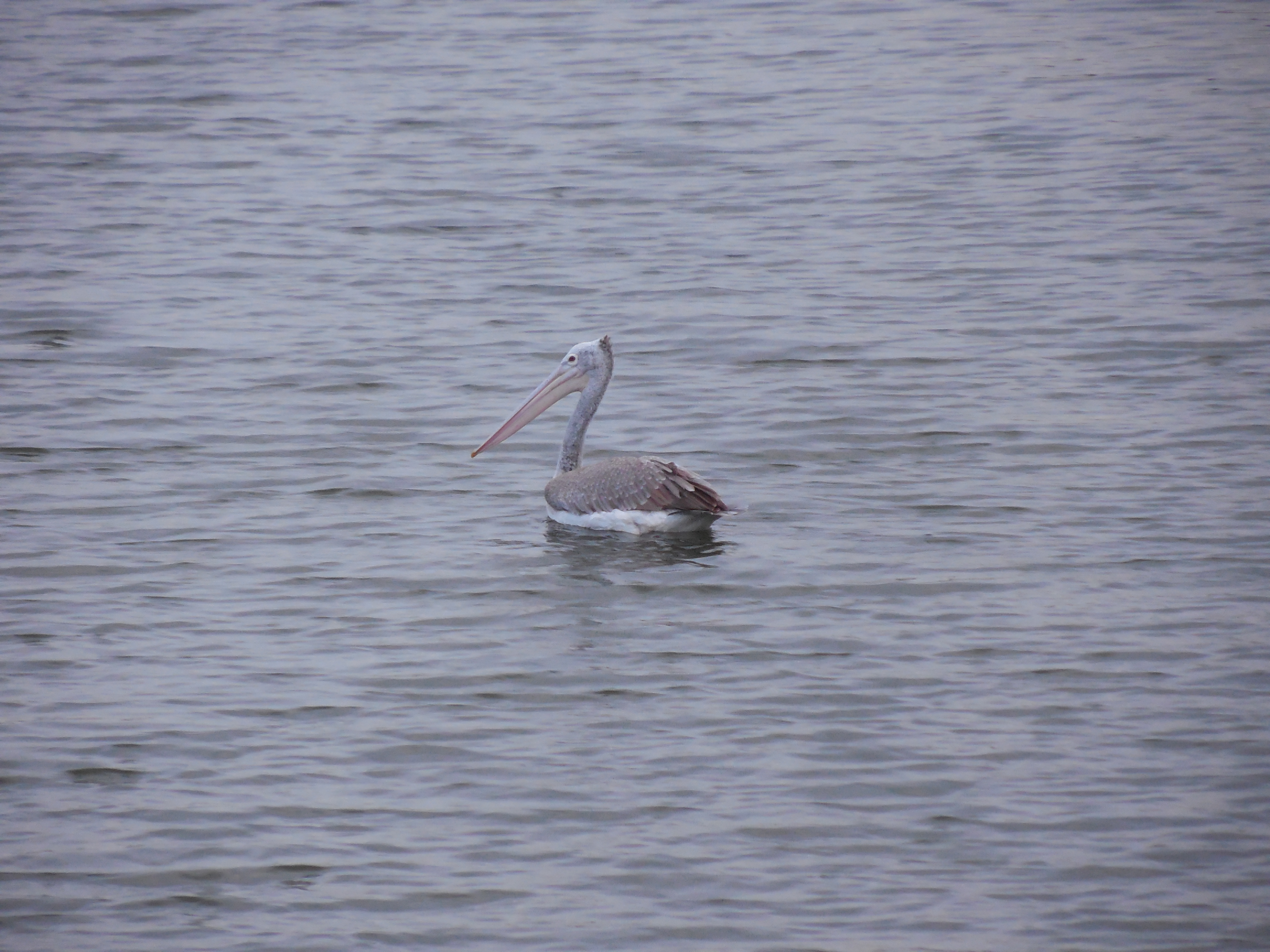
A Pelican (Seen in July)

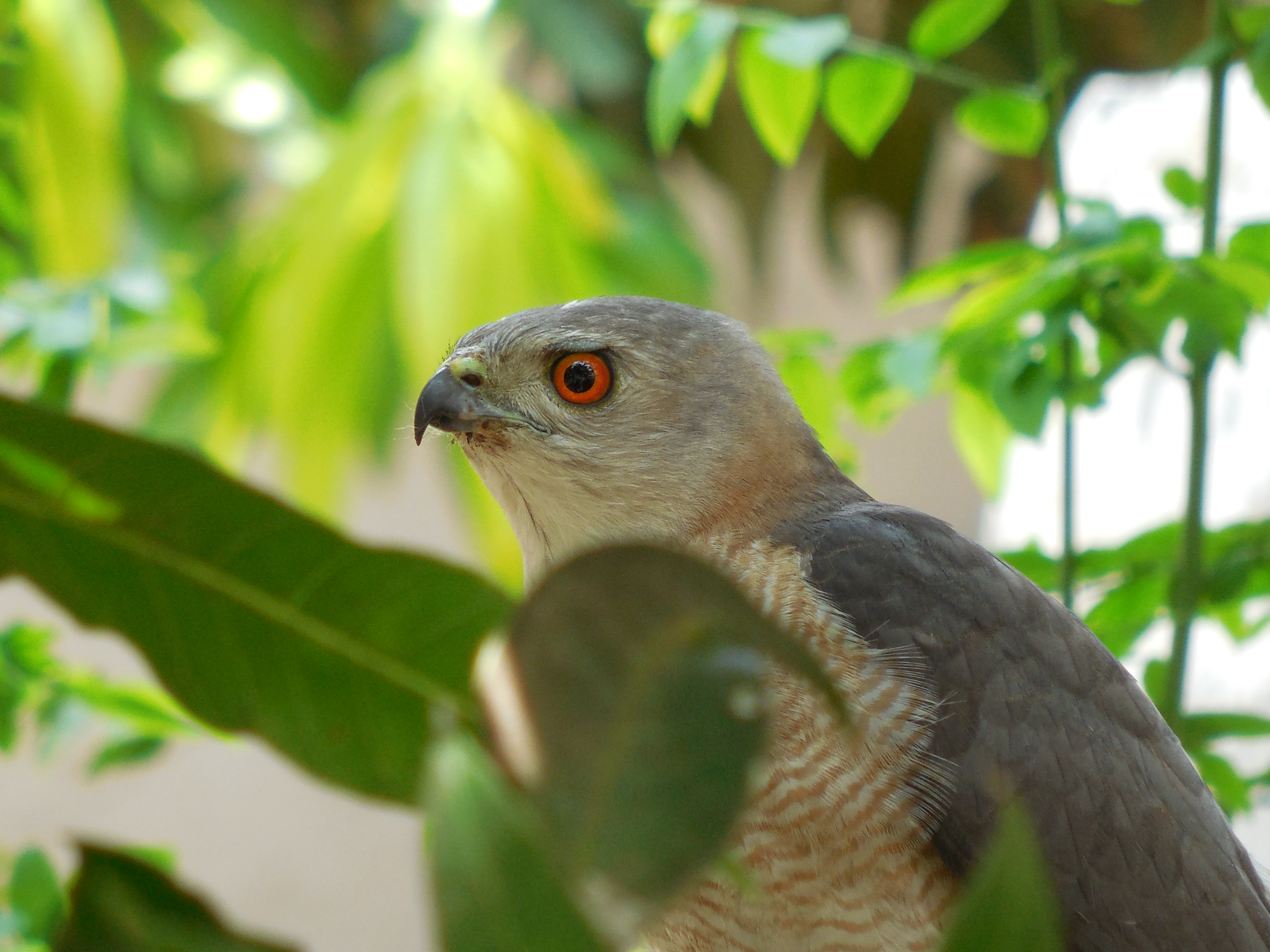
A shikra (Seen in April)

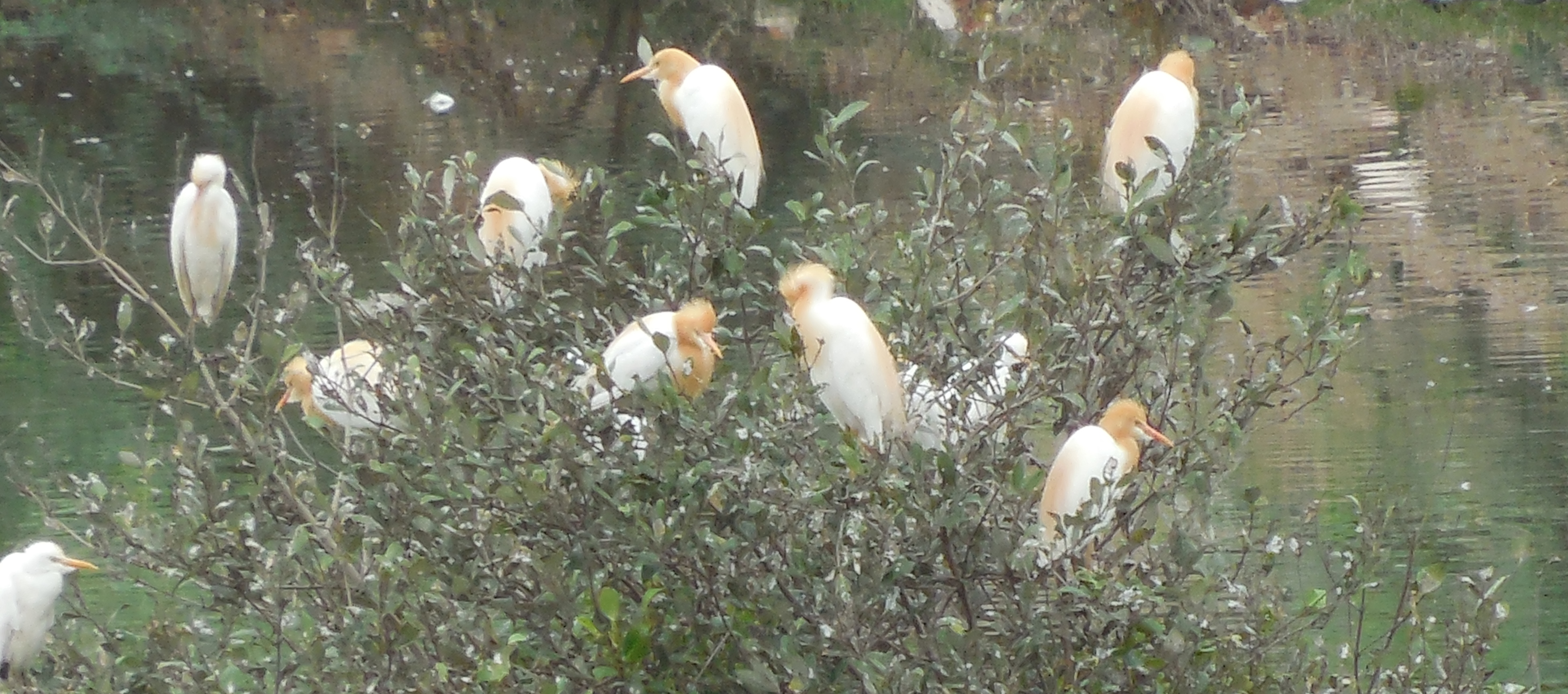
Cattle herons (Seen in May)

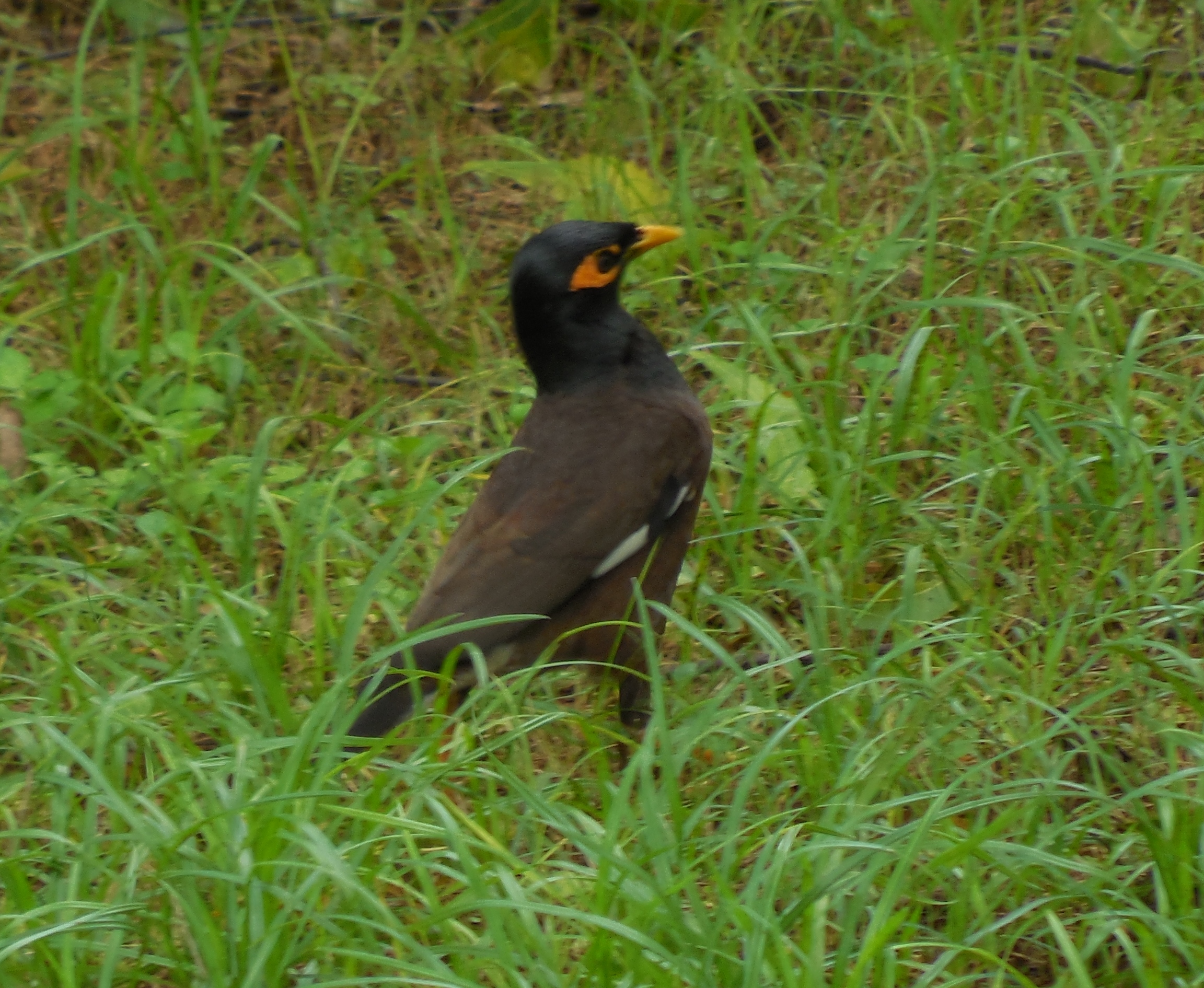
Common myna (Daily)

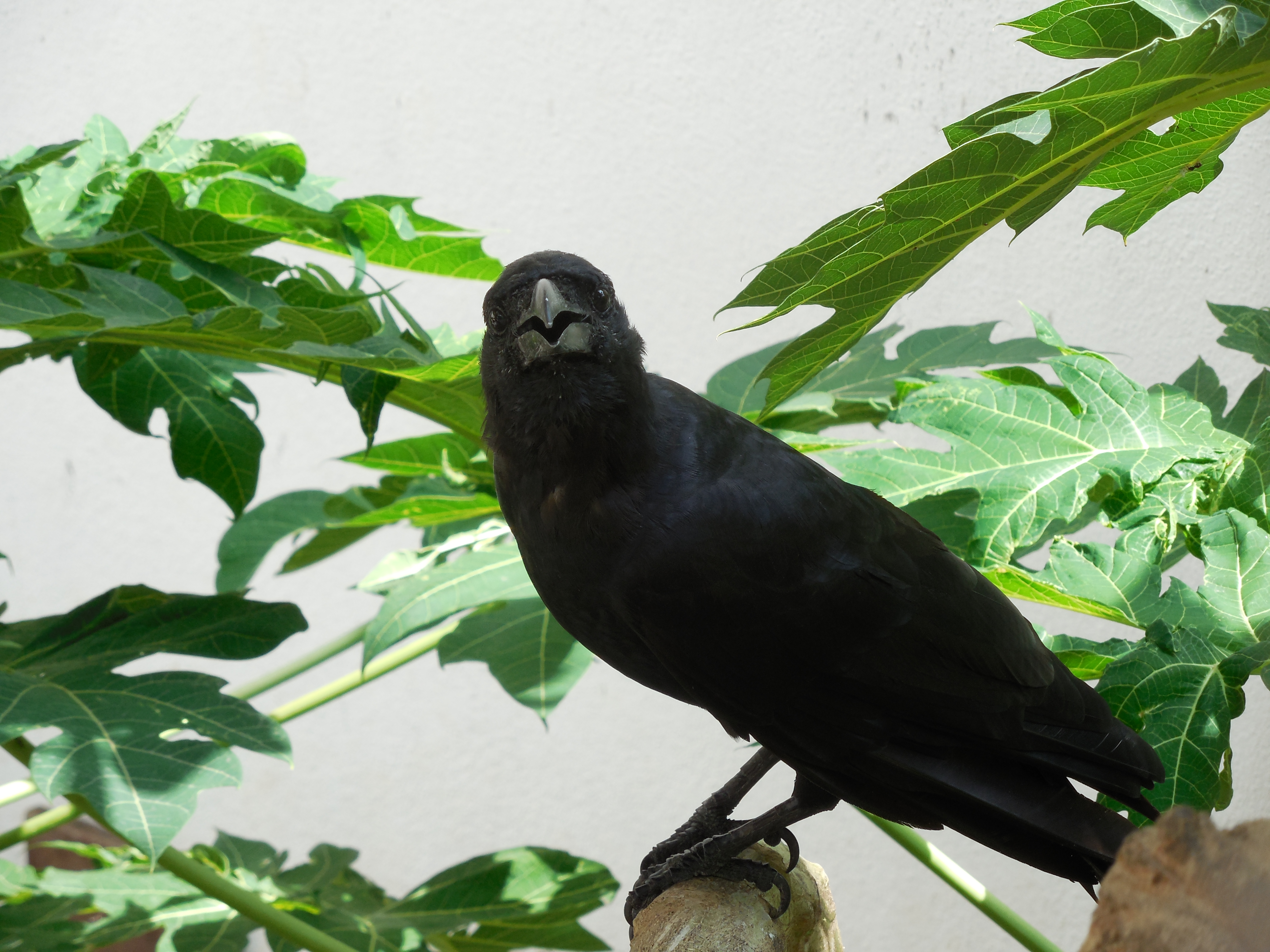
An Indian jungle crow (Daily)

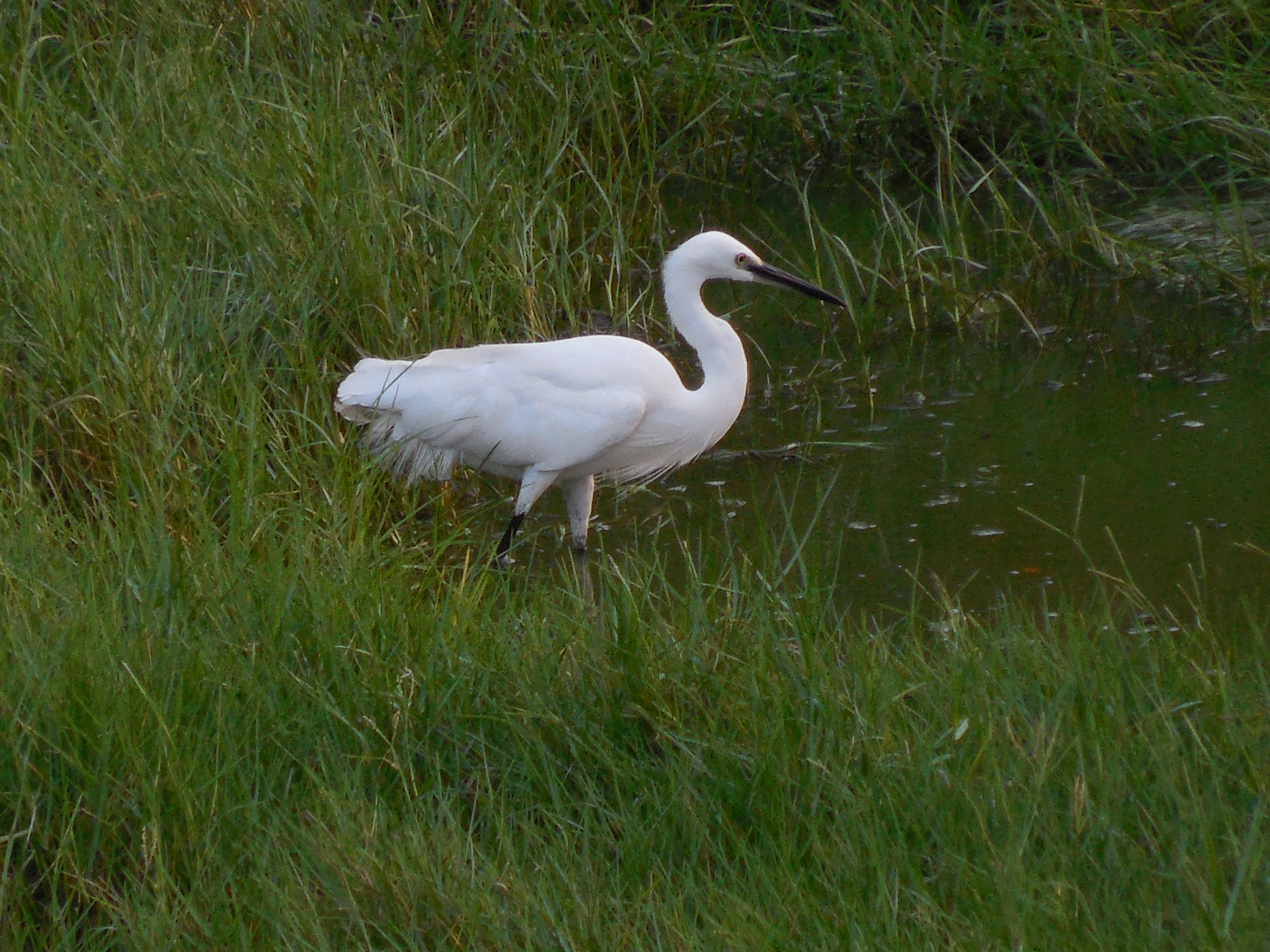
A little egret (Daily)

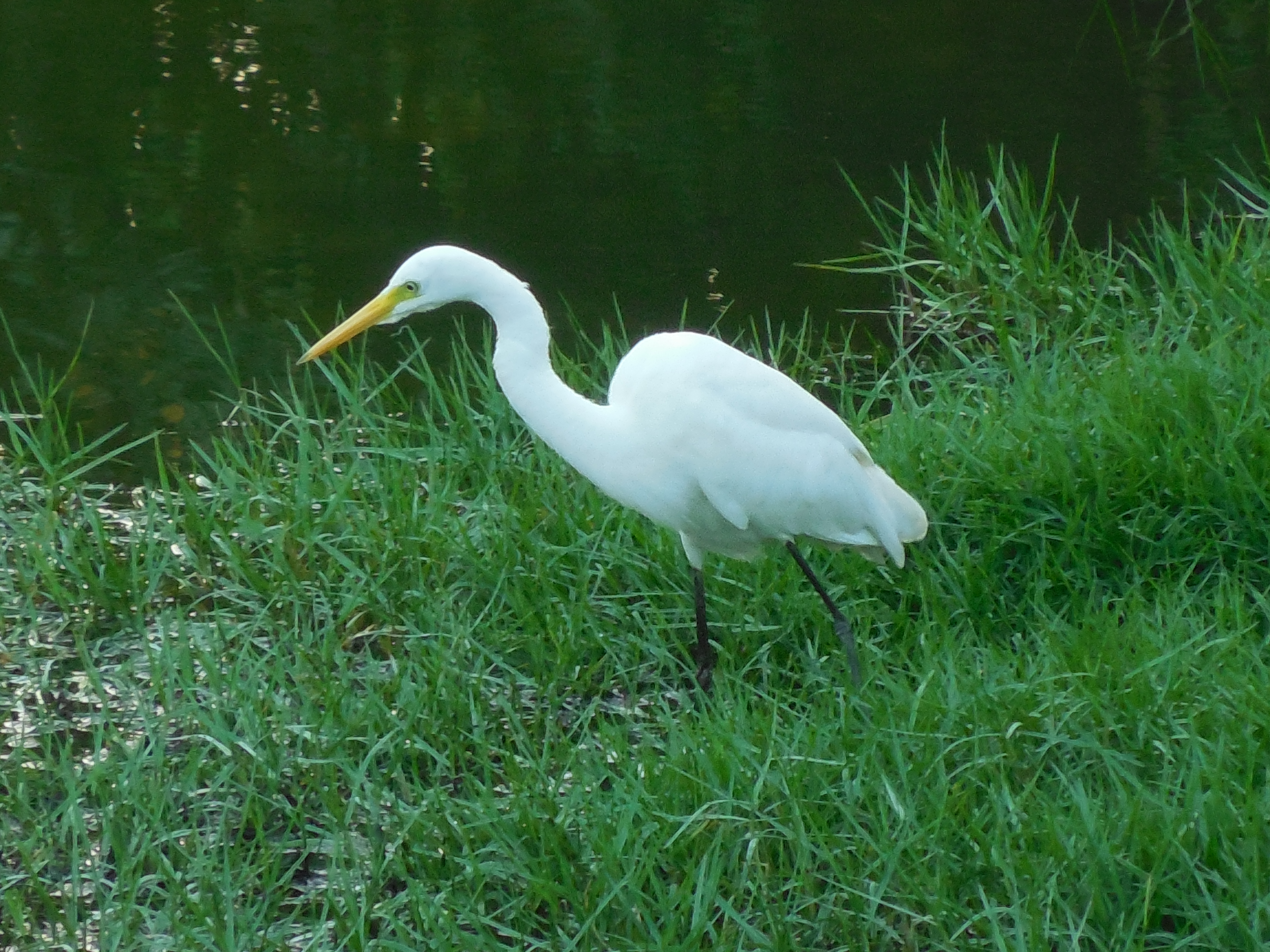
A yellow billed intermediate egret (Daily)

== See also ==
- Madhavaram botanical garden
- Semmozhi Poonga
- Parks in Chennai
