= Adyar River =

River in India

Coordinates: 13.01367°N 80.26559°E

Adyar
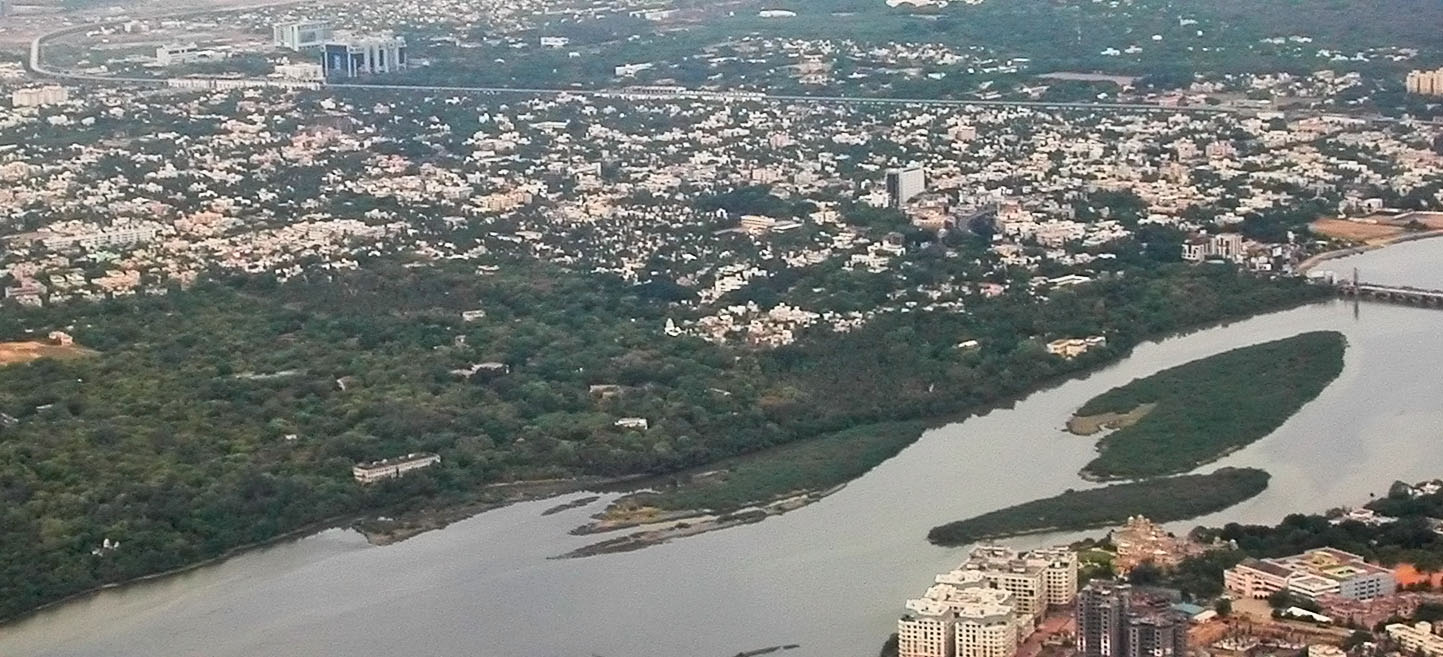
- Adyar in Chennai.

- Mouth

Location
- Country: India
- State: Tamil Nadu
- City: Chennai (Madras)

Physical characteristics
- Source: Adanur Tank
  - location: Manimangalam village, Kancheepuram, Tamil Nadu, India
- Mouth: Adyar estuary
  - location: Tamil Nadu, India
- Length: 26 mi (42 km)
- Basin size: 204 sq mi (530 km^{2})
- Discharge
  - location: Adyar, Chennai (Madras)

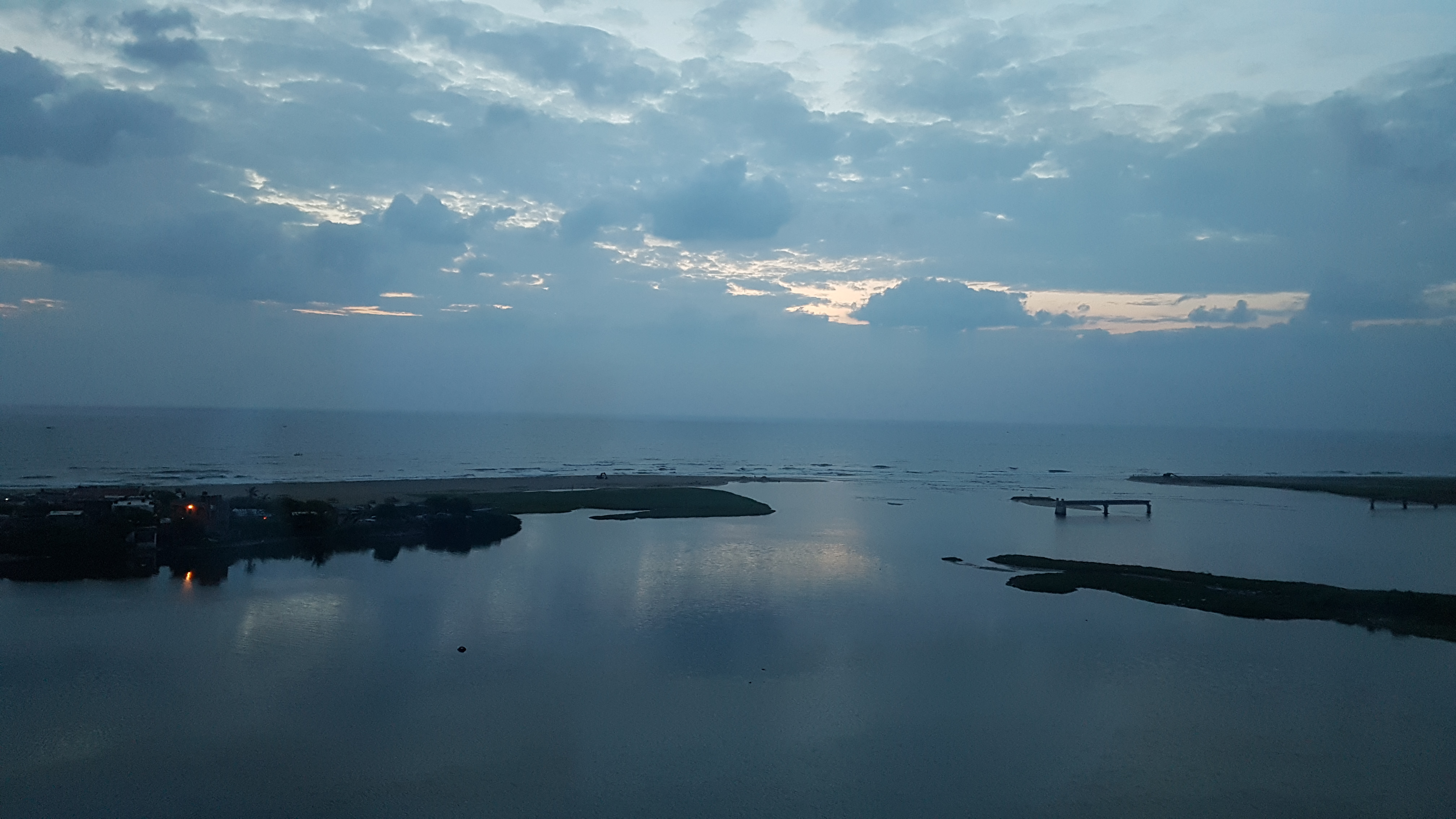
Adayar River Joining the Bay of Bengal

The Adyar River, which originates from the Adhanur Lake in the Kanchipuram district, is one of the three rivers that winds through Chennai, Tamil Nadu, India, and joins the Bay of Bengal at the Adyar estuary. The 42.5-kilometre (26.4 mi) long river contributes to the estuarine ecosystem of Chennai. Despite the high pollution levels, boating and fishing take place in this river. The river collects surplus water from about 200 tanks and lakes, small streams and the rainwater drains in the city, with a combined catchment area of 860 square kilometres (331 mi^{2}). Most of the waste from the city is drained into this river and the Cooum.

== Origin and course ==
The Adyar starts from the Malaipattu tank (80.00° longitude and 12.93° latitude) near Manimangalam in Sriperumbudur taluk at about 15 kilometres (9 mi) west of Tambaram in south Chennai. It begins to resemble a stream only from the point where water released from Chembarambakkam Lake joins the river at Thiruneermalai. It flows through Kancheepuram, Tiruvallur and Chennai districts for about 42.5 kilometres (26.4 mi) before joining the Bay of Bengal in Adyar, Chennai. Here it forms an estuary, which extends from Adyar Bridge to the sandbar at the edge of the sea, with some small islets in between. The estuary attracts a wide variety of birds. The estuary covering an area of about 120 hectares (300 acres) was made a protected wildlife reserve in 1987. The river forms a backwater near the mouth, known as the Adyar creek, due to the formation of sand bar at the mouth. This creek is a natural channel which carries tidal water back into the sea.

== Geography ==
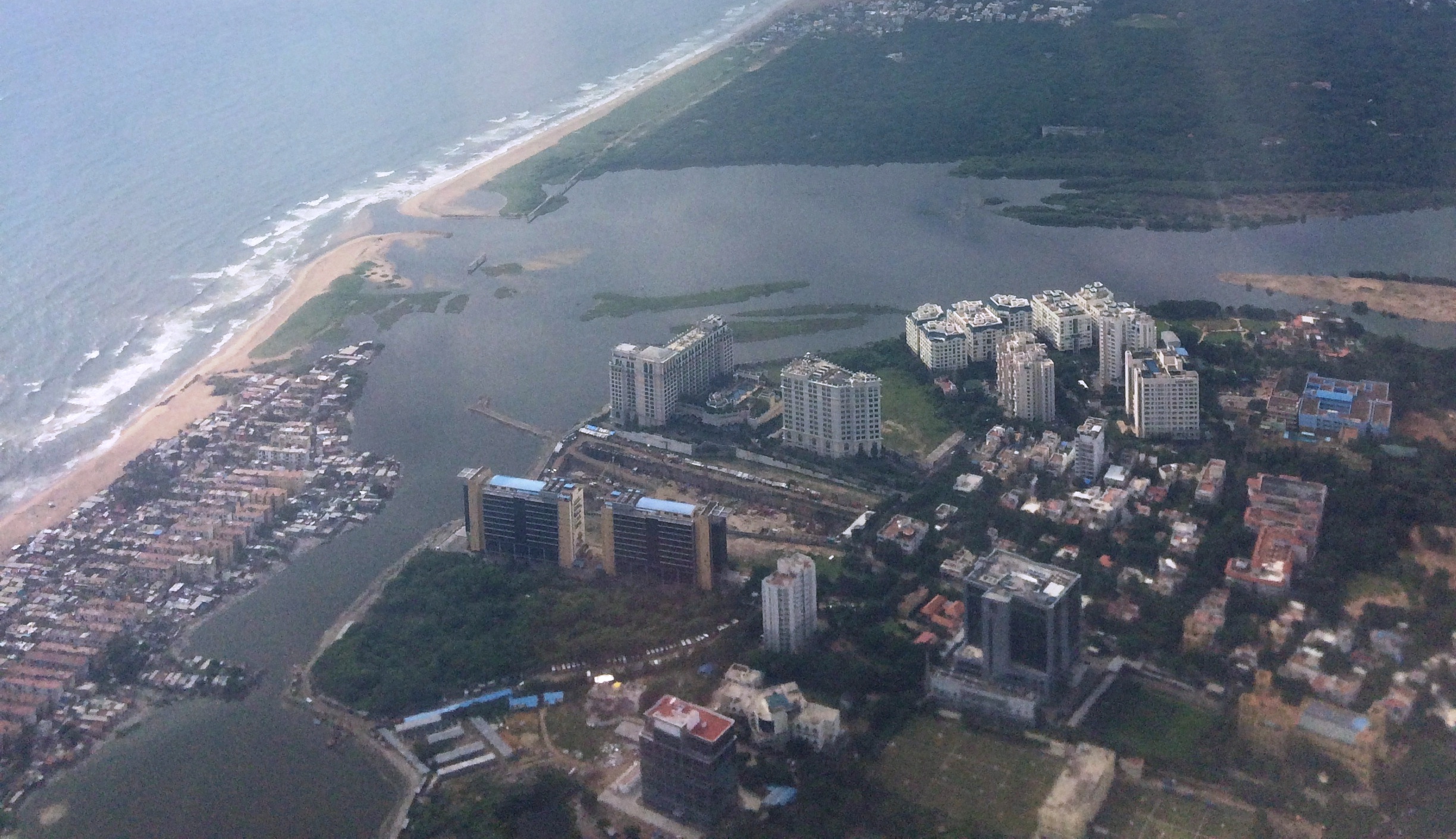
Aerial view of the Adyar creek

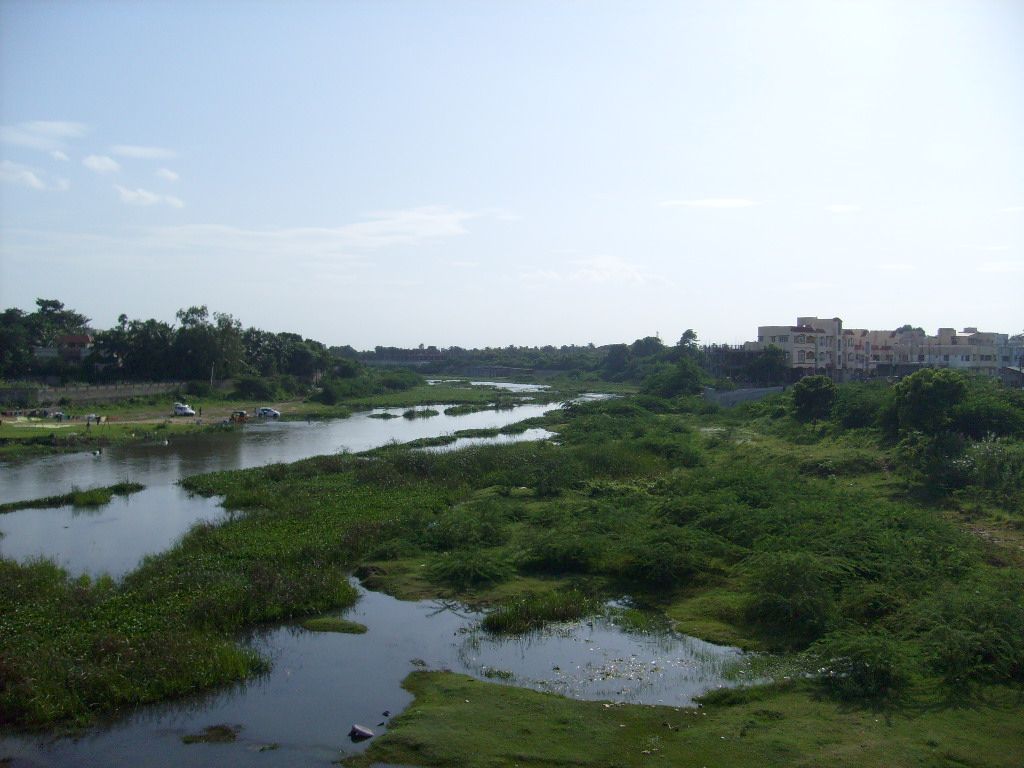
A view of the Adyar River from the Manapakkam Bridge

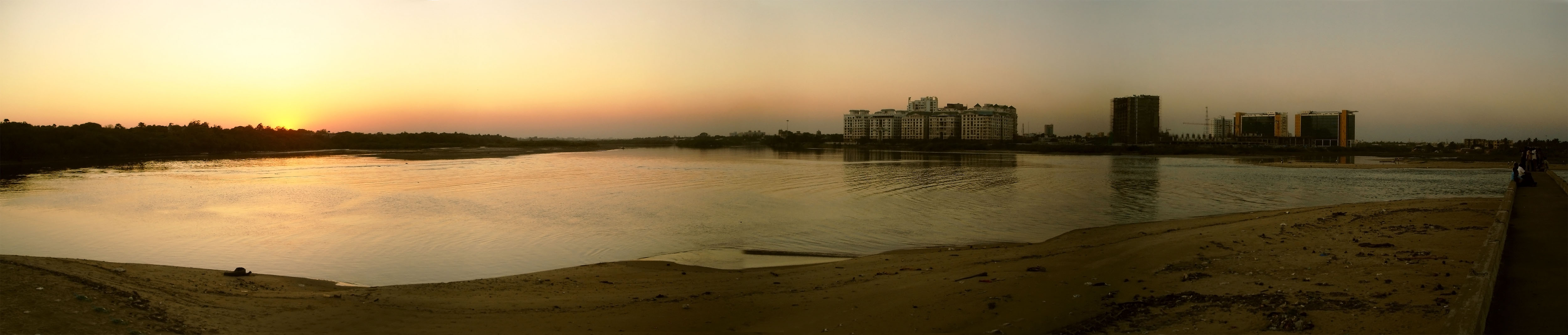
Sunset over the river

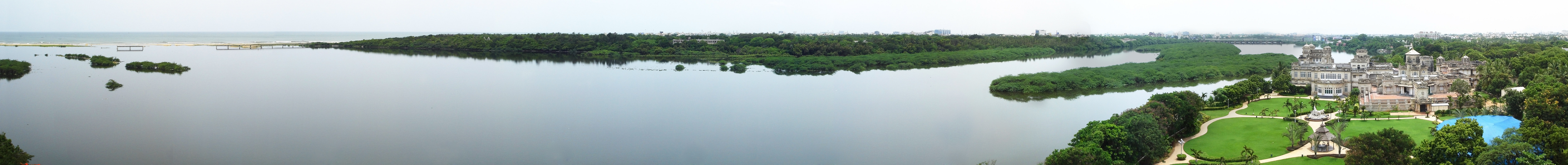
The Adyar Estuary

The river has varying depth of approximately 0.75 metres (2.5 ft) in its upper reaches and 0.5 metres (1.6 ft) in its lower reaches. The catchment area of the river is 530 square kilometres (200 mi^{2}). Bed width ranges from 10.5 to 200 metres (34 to 656 ft). It flows for 24 kilometres (15 mi) in the Chennai Metropolitan Area including about 15 kilometres (9 mi) within the Chennai district before draining into the sea. It discharges about 190 to 940 million cubic metres (150,000 to 760,000 acre⋅ft) water annually to the Bay of Bengal. The discharge is seasonal with about 7 to 33 times more than the annual average during the Northeast monsoon season between September and December. The river is also supplied by surplus water from about 40 ponds.

The present discharge of the river is 39,000 cu.ft/s whereas the anticipated flood discharge capacity is about 60,000 cubic feet per second. During the floods of 2005, the river had a discharge of 55,000 cubic feet per second.

== Ecology ==
Adyar Estuary and Creek and the Theososphical Society on the Estuary's southern side has been a haven for migratory and resident birds for years. The environmental conditions in the estuary with low salinity, good shelters and high plankton availability in the Adyar creek serves as a good nursery for fish. The flow of tidal water in and out of the creek allowed for easy travel of boats. It therefore encouraged fishing and there was a thriving economy of fish trade here. However, with the city's sewage and effluence from its various industries, for some time, emptying into the river, the biological activities in the region was affected. Although the number has been in decline due to pollution and anthropogenic activities, they still attract hundreds of birds. A few years before, the Theosophical Society has come out with a CD on 'Birds of Adyar', compiled by the Trust for Environment Monitoring and Action Initiation. The Adyar Poonga, whose Phase 1 and 2 stand completed (as of 2015), are a first towards restoring this fragile but vibrant eco-system. Efforts were being made by the AIADMK government to close sewage inlets, free the flood banks from encroachments, and replant native varieties of trees after cordoning of the river, to prevent further illegal occupation since the Chennai Floods of 2015 and have been reasonably successful.

== Landmarks ==
The Theosophical Society, Anna University, Madras Boat Club, Thenral are prominent institutions located in the banks of Adyar. Adayar river crosses 6 line Outer Ring Road landmark of Royappa nagar And JJ Nagar.

== Contamination ==
The river receives a sizeable quantity of sewage from Chennai after reaching Nandambakkam near Chennai. The river is almost stagnant except during the rainy season. Rapid industrialisation and urbanisation have led to severe contamination. Adyar River receives 10% of the untreated sewage being let into the three principle waterways of Chennai daily; the Buckingham Canal and the Cooum River receive 60% and 30%, respectively.

The problem of sedimentation was not severe as the Adyar's width near Thiru.Vi.Ka. Bridge is nearly 480 metres (1,570 ft) that enabled tidal effect into the waterway for about 4 kilometres (2.5 mi). However, it was essential to provide groynes to keep the river mouth open for adequate width and prevent inundation during monsoon. In 2011, the Water Resources Department (WRD) proposed to construct groynes to reduce formation of sand bars near the mouth the river.

== Cleaning up ==
In 2012, the state government allotted ₹ 3,000 million towards construction of 337 sewage cleaning systems in the waterways in the city, including 49 locations in the Adyar river. Others include 105 points in Cooum river and 183 locations in the Buckingham Canal.

== Bridges ==
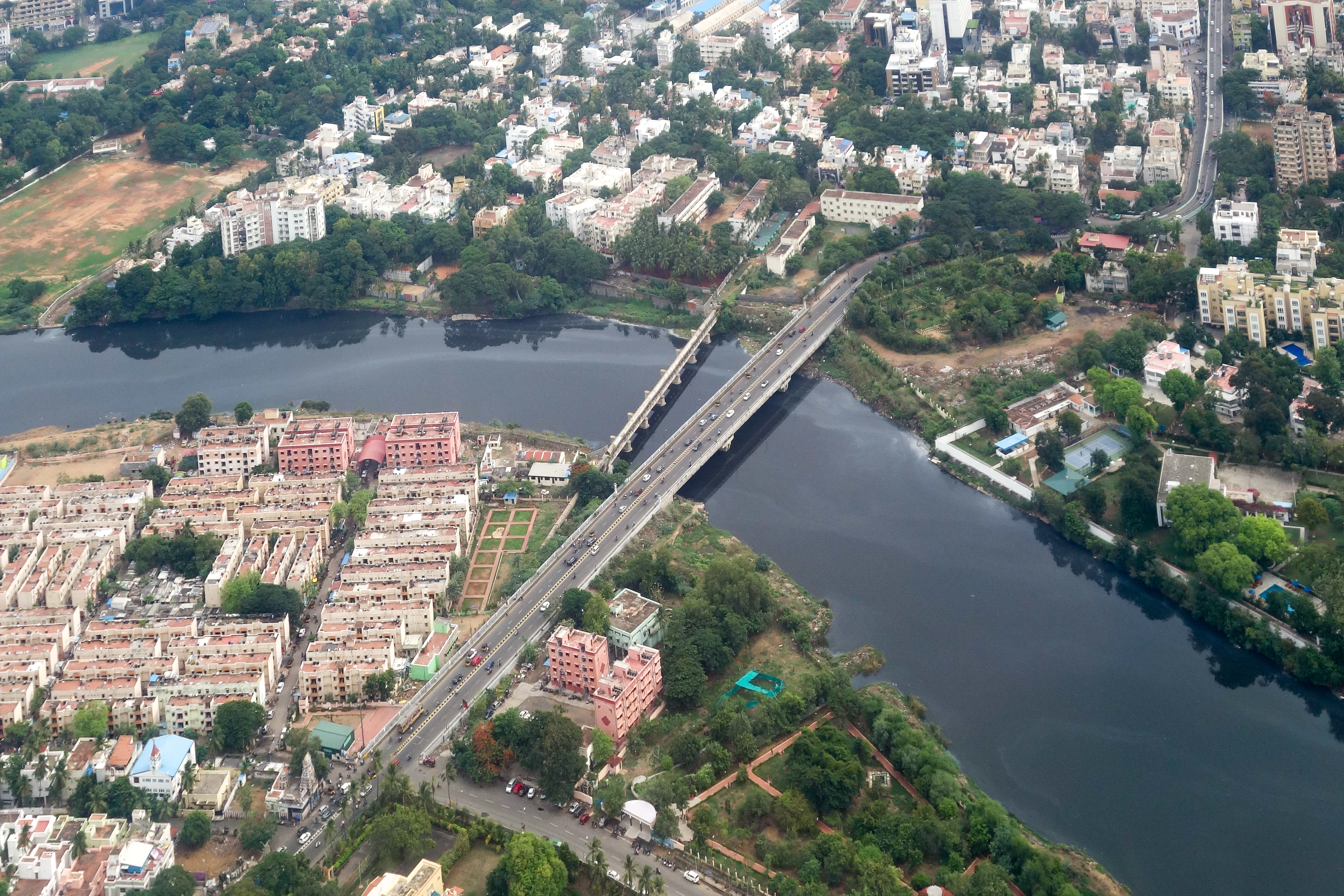
Kotturpuram Bridge (aerial view), 2018

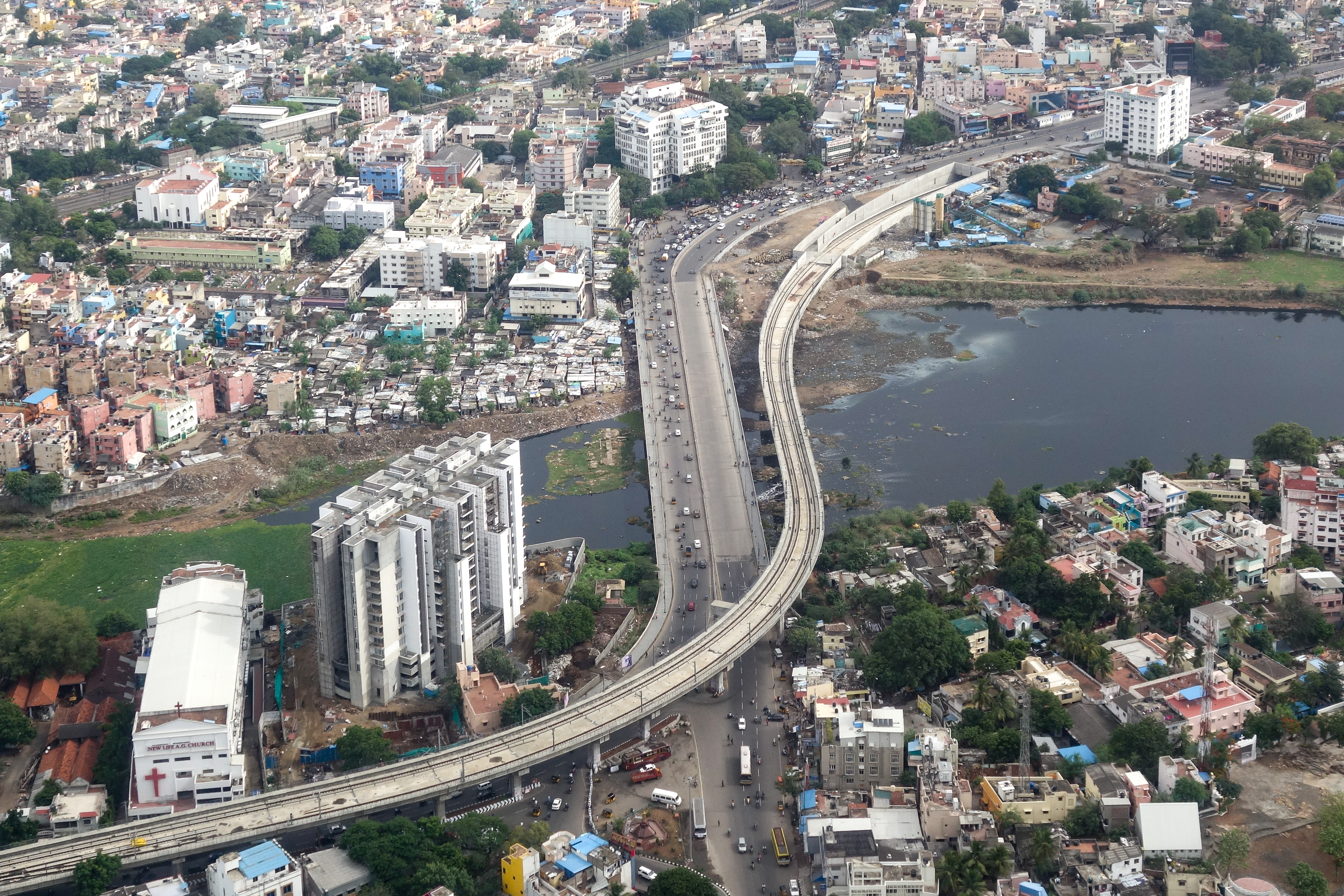
Maramalai Adigalar Bridge and Metro Line 1 bridge (aerial view), 2018

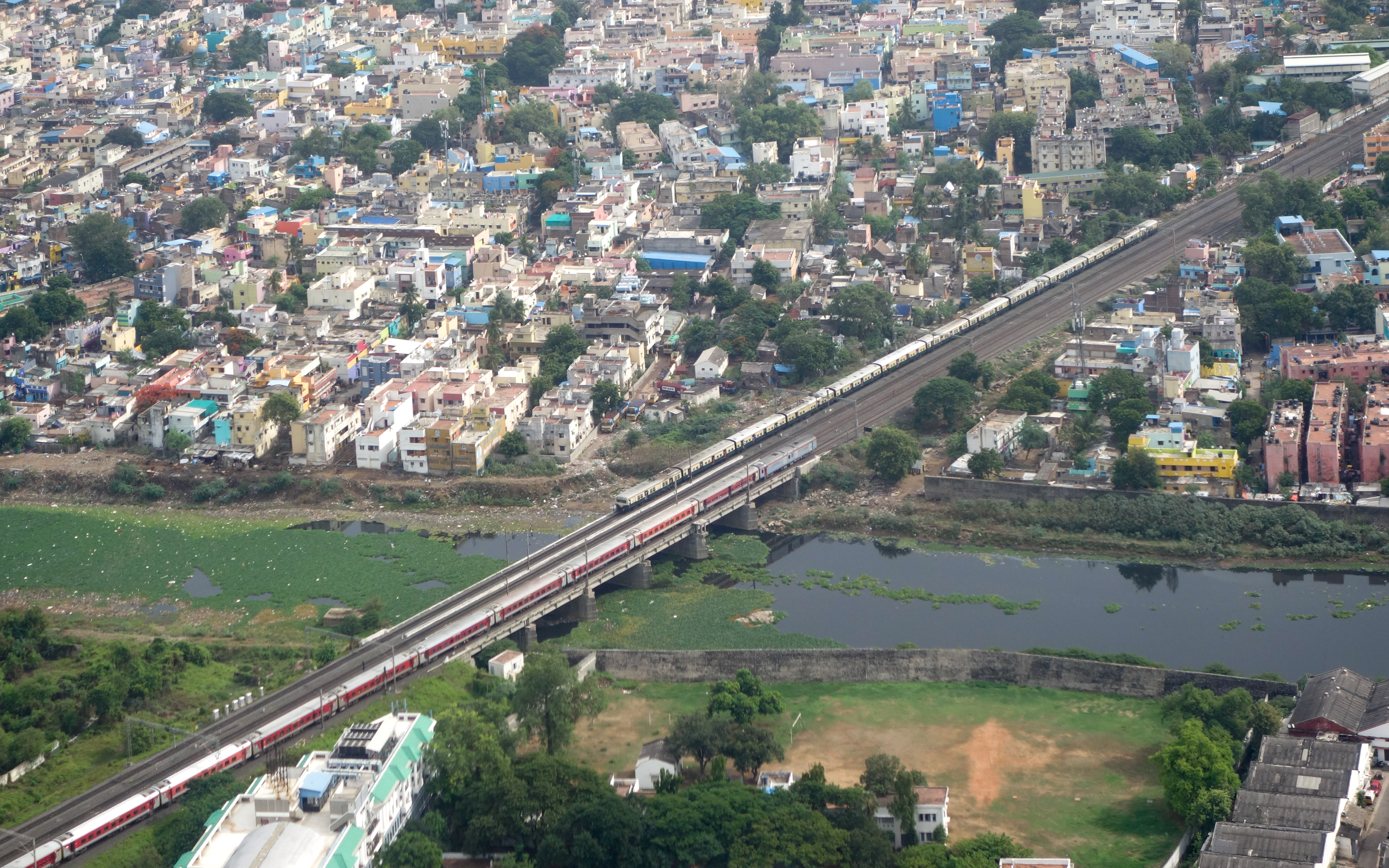
Guindy Railway Bridge (aerial view), 2018

There are several bridges built across the river over the course of time. The Corporation of Chennai maintains about 6 of these bridges.

- Broken bridge in Foreshore Estate
- Eliphinstone Bridge in Adyar
- Thiru Vi Ka Bridge in Adyar
- Kotturpuram Bridge in Kotturpuram
- Maramalai Adigalar Bridge in Saidapet
- Abraham Bridge (replaced Alandur Causeway) in West Saidapet
- Jafferkhanpet Bridge in Jafferkhanpet
- Manapakkam Bridge in Manapakkam

The Thiru Vi Ka Bridge was constructed at a cost of ₹ 5.8 million and was inaugurated in October 1973. It is a four-laned bridge measuring 312 metres (1,025 ft) long and 19 metres (62 ft) wide. During the time of its inauguration, the bridge had separate lanes for cyclists and footpaths for pedestrians. The bridge was damaged in November 1985 due to a rush of flood water, resulting in the suspension of vehicular traffic over the bridge. It had developed a gaping hole and a portion of the road surface had caved in.

The Elphinstone Bridge was constructed in the 1840s during the time of Lord Elphinstone, who was governor of Madras from 1837 to 1842 and was the first to connect south Madras to Santhome and Mylapore. Before its construction, there were no bridges across the Adyar river except the causeway then known as Marmalong Bridge. Parisals, which were round floats pushed by long poles, were the chief mode of transportation across the river, and there were several makeshift landing places on the banks of the river for carrying goods. Soon, the British found the area between Santhome and the river suitable for building their farmhouses. Further developments during the first half of the 19th century probably necessitated the building of a new bridge. The bridge was still in use during the time of inauguration of the Thiru Vi Ka bridge. The bridge was meant for other, slow-moving traffic across the river. However, the bridge was severely damaged during a cyclone between 1876 and 1878. Today the bridge carries sewer pipelines. It is 11 metres (36 ft) wide and has concrete slabs covering the sewer pipelines running over it. The full width of the bridge is covered with the slabs and either side of the bridge has a flight of stairs, which is used by pedestrians.

In October 2005, a new bridge adjacent to the existing Thiru Vi Ka bridge was proposed as a two-lane facility. However, it was then decided to build it as a three-laned one based on a traffic survey. Construction work began in December 2010. The 16-span bridge, being built at a cost of ₹ 139.6 million, is 333 metres (1,093 ft) long and 11 metres (36 ft) wide. It is being built between the Thiru Vi Ka bridge and the Elphinstone bridge that carries the Chennai Metrowater lines. Although the capacity of the bridge is only 1,450 passenger car unit (PCU), the level of congestion during peak hours is 10,747 PCU—about 7.41 times its capacity.

The runways of Chennai International Airport were extended across the Adyar River. This contributed to the flooding of the airport during the 2015 South India floods.

== Encroachments ==
The banks of the Adyar river flooded often due to uncontrolled and unchecked encroachments. However, ever since the devastating Chennai Floods of 2015, where 29,000 cusecs of water were estimated to have been released, purging everything in its path, the AIADMK government, has made sustained efforts, to clean the river, with reasonable success - including cordon of its bank with a dedicated wall, remove encroachments from the Jaffarkhanpet End, till the mouth of the river near the Broken Bridge, along its flood banks, as well as regularly de-silt its sister channels, stormwater inlets and the river itself.

== Gallery ==
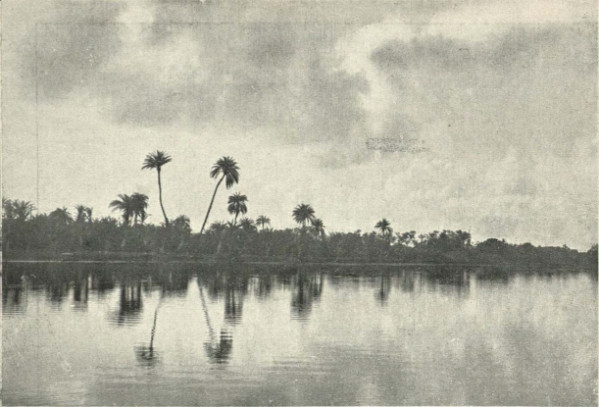
The Adyar River, c. 1905

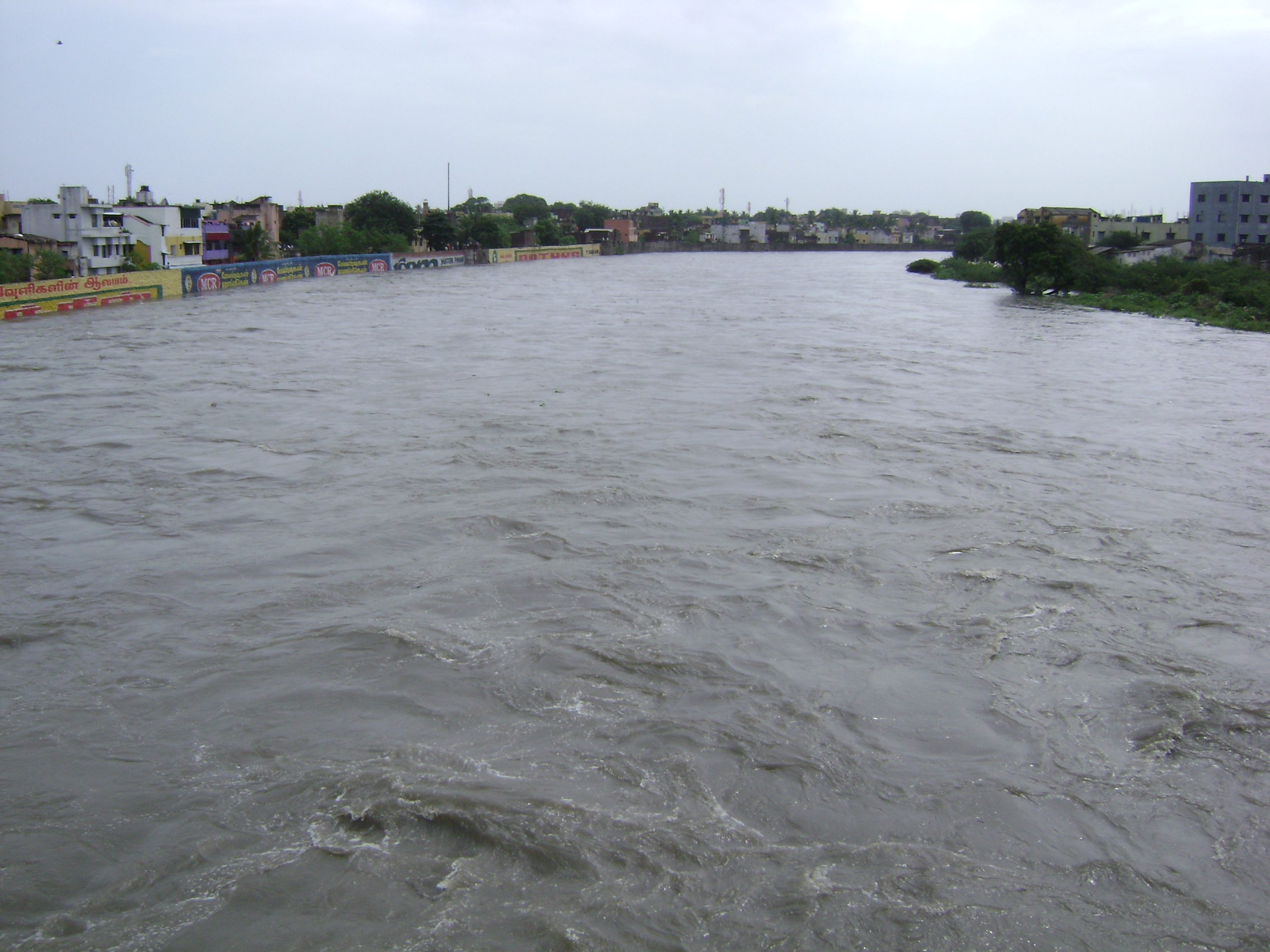
A flooded Adyar river

== See also ==
- Cooum river
- Kosasthalaiyar river
- Water management in Chennai
