= Adyar Creek =

Backwater estuary in Adyar, Chennai, India

Coordinates: 13°00′N 80°15′E

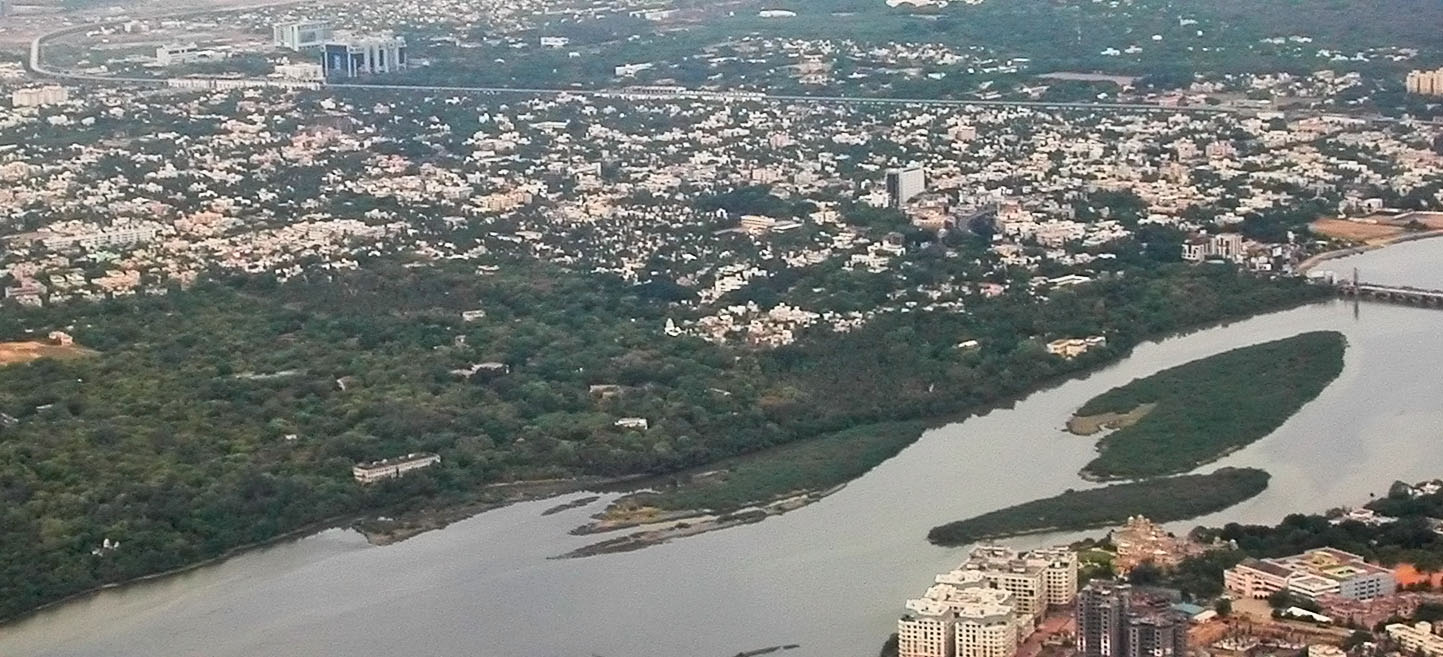
Adyar Creek as viewed from near the coast

Adyar Creek is a backwater estuary located in the Adyar area of Chennai, India. Situated at the mouth of the Adyar River along the Coromandel Coast, the creek surrounds the Quibble Island before draining into the Bay of Bengal.

The creek had been heavily affected by urban pollution over time. As a result, the creek and it's surrounding ecosystem underwent a major ecological restoration in 2008, leading to the establishment of Tholkappia Poonga eco-park.

== Eco-restoration ==
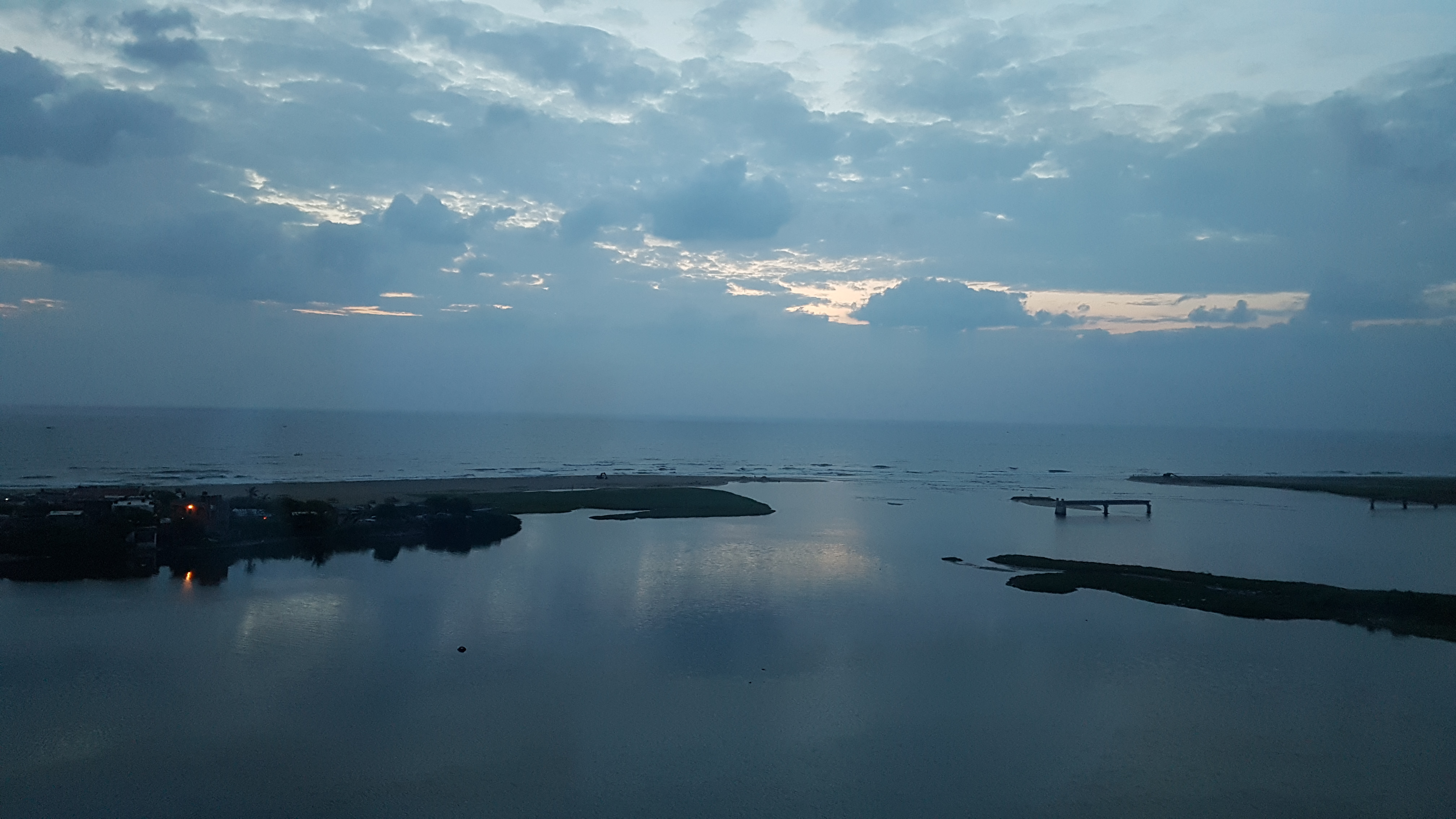
The creek forms where the Adyar River joins the Bay of Bengal.

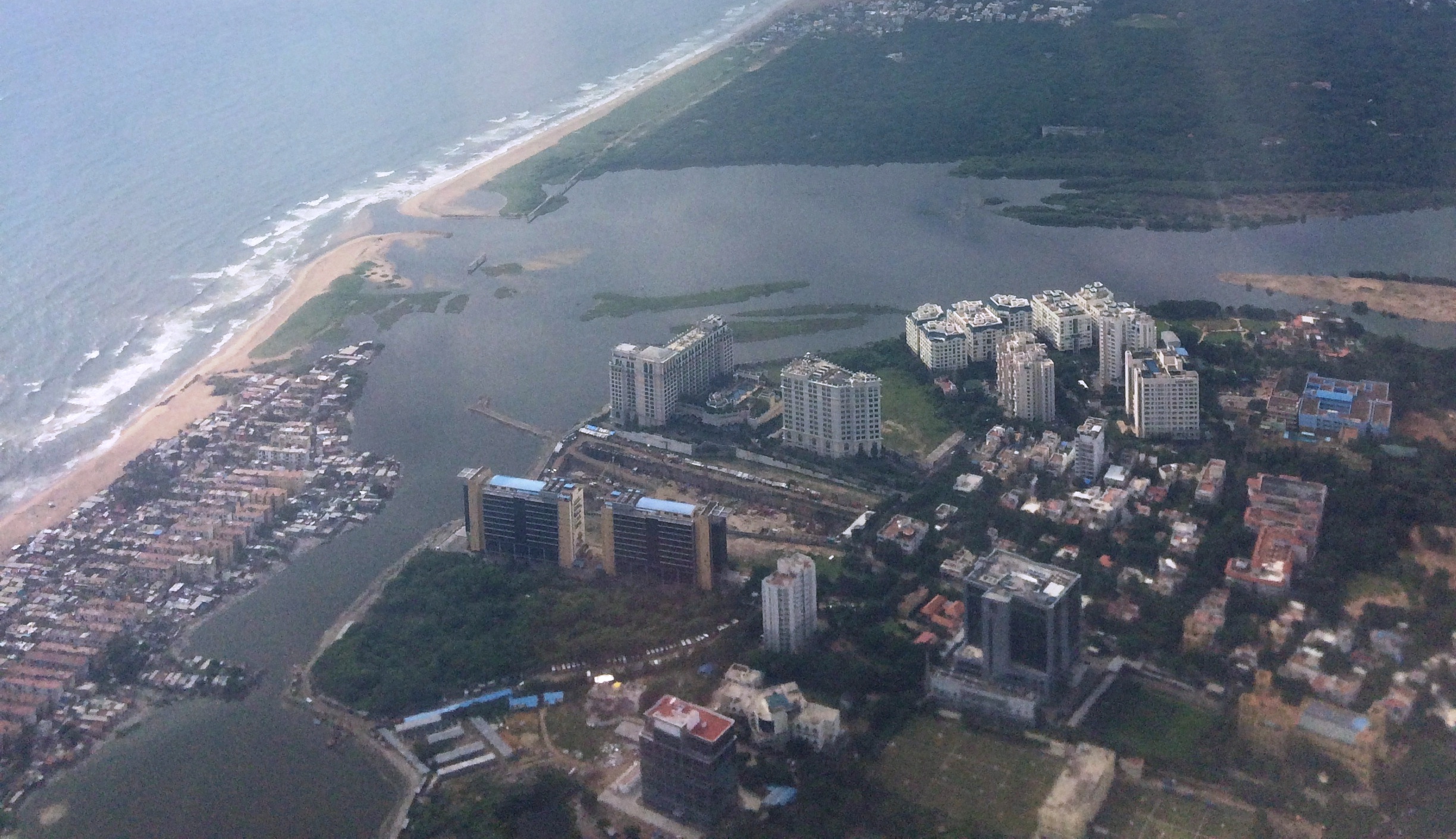
Aerial view of the Adyar creek

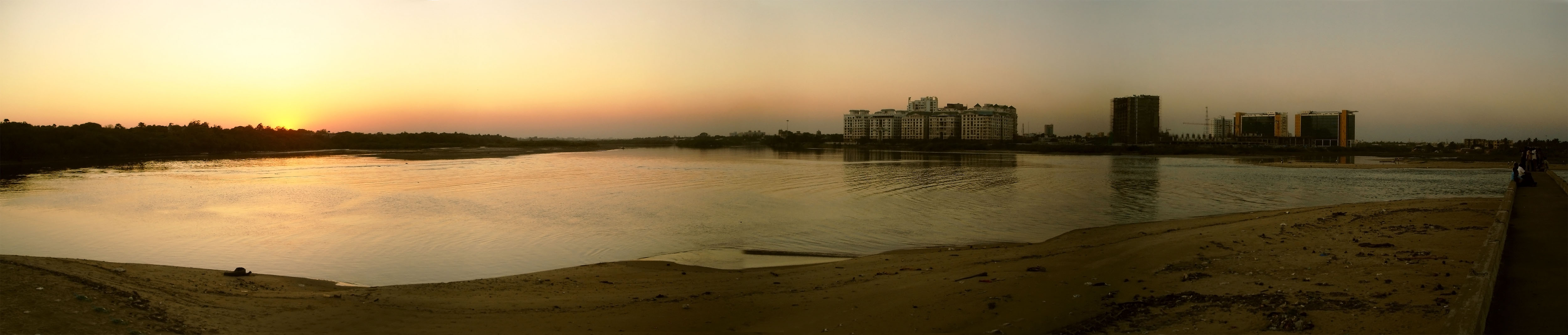
Sunset over the river

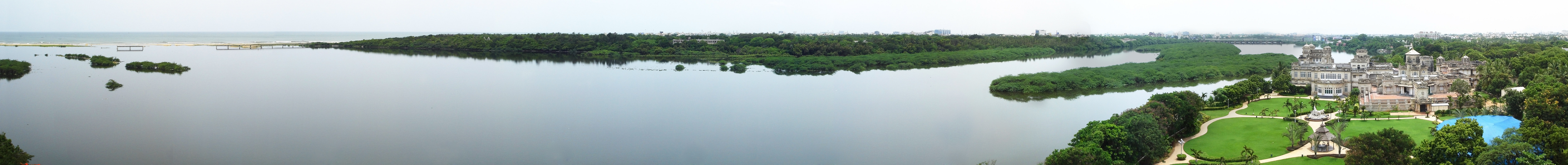
The Adyar estuary

The restoration of the creek was carried out by the Chennai Rivers Restoration Trust in two phases. Phase I focused on 58 acres and opened in 2011 as the Tholkappia Poonga eco-park.Phase II covered the remaining 300 acres of the creek and estuary surrounding Quibble Island, clearing sludge, removing invasive species, and planting of mangroves and native vegetation. Approximately 57,000 mangroves and 35,000 saplings were planted in the restored area. The park reopened to the public in the later part of 2025.

== Ecology ==
Following eco-restoration, the faunal diversity in the creek has increased from 273 in 2016–2017 to 331 in 2017–2018. During this period, Insect species - including butterflies and dragonflies - increased from 98 to 155. A total of 8 species of molluscs, 13 species of crabs, 155 species of insects, 10 species of fishes, 10 species of amphibians, 19 species of reptiles, 105 species of birds and 16 species of animals have been recorded in the eco park area.

== See also ==
- Ennore Creek
- Pallikaranai wetland
- Birding in Chennai
- Water management in Chennai
