= Malaipattu =

Neighbourhood in Kanchipuram district, Tamil Nadu, India

- Neighbourhood
- Malaipattu, Kanchipuram district, Tamil Nadu
- Coordinates: 12.9324°N 80.0171°E
- Country: India
- State: Tamil Nadu
- District: Kanchipuram
- Elevation: 32.3 m (106 ft)

Population (2011)
  - Total: 1,078

Languages
  - Official: Tamil, English
  - Speech: Tamil, English
- Time zone: UTC+5:30 (IST)
- PIN: 602301
- Other Neighbourhoods: Somangalam, Amarambedu, Mannivakkam
- LS: Sriperumbudur
- VS: Sriperumbudur

Malaipattu is a neighbourhood in Kanchipuram district of Tamil Nadu state in India.

== Location ==
Malaipattu is located with the coordinates of (12.9324°N 80.0171°E) in Kanchipuram district.

Malaipattu (Tamil Nadu)

== Population ==
As per 2011 census of India, Malaipattu had a population of 1,078 persons, out of which 551 were males and females constituted 527 persons.

== Religion ==
=== Temples ===
There is a Perumal temple viz., Kalyana Srinivasa Perumal Temple and also a Hanuman temple named Kanyakumari Jaya Hanuman temple are situated at Malaipattu.
