= Brody (disambiguation) =

Brody is a city in Ukraine.

Brody may also refer to:

== People ==
- Brody (name), a common family name and given name
- Jorge Campos (born 1966), Mexican retired footballer nicknamed "El Brody"

== Places ==
- Brody, Nowy Tomyśl County in Greater Poland Voivodeship (west-central Poland)
- Brody, Turek County in Greater Poland Voivodeship (west-central Poland)
- Brody, Kuyavian-Pomeranian Voivodeship (north-central Poland)
- Brody, Lesser Poland Voivodeship (south Poland)
- Brody, Łódź Voivodeship (central Poland)
- Brody, Żary County in Lubusz Voivodeship (west Poland)
- Brody, Zielona Góra County in Lubusz Voivodeship (west Poland)
- Brody, Gmina Pomiechówek, Nowy Dwór County in Masovian Voivodeship (east-central Poland)
- Brody, Radom County in Masovian Voivodeship (south Poland)
- Brody, Płońsk County in Masovian Voivodeship (east-central Poland)
- Brody, Podlaskie Voivodeship (north-east Poland)
- Brody Pomorskie, Pomeranian Voivodeship (north Poland)
- Brody, Kielce County in Świętokrzyszkie Voivodeship (south-central Poland)
- Brody, Końskie County in Świętokrzyszkie Voivodeship (south-central Poland)
- Brody, Starachowice County in Świętokrzyszkie Voivodeship (south-central Poland)
- Brody, Staszów County in Świętokrzyszkie Voivodeship (south-central Poland)

== Other uses ==
- Brody (air base), near Brody, Ukraine
- Brody Castle, near Brody, Ukraine
- Brody School of Medicine at East Carolina University, United States
- Brody Complex, a set of residential buildings at Michigan State University, United States
- Brody Museum of History and District Ethnography, in Brody, Ukraine
- Battle of Brody (disambiguation), four 19th and 20th century battles in the vicinity of Brody, Ukraine
- Brody's, a defunct fashion merchandising chain in North Carolina, United States
- Brody the Bear, a bear actor

== See also ==
- Brodie (disambiguation)
