= 16th Army Aviation Brigade =

Ukrainian Ground Forces unit

- 16-та окрема бригада армійської авіації "Броди"
- Active: 30 May 1981 - present
- Country: Ukraine; Soviet Union (1981–1991)
- Allegiance: Armed Forces of Ukraine
- Branch: Ukrainian Ground Forces
- Type: Brigade
- Role: Army aviation
- Garrison/HQ: Brody Air Base, Lviv Oblast
- Nickname: Brody
- Engagements: Russo-Ukrainian War
- Decorations: For Courage and Bravery
- Website: Official Facebook page

Commanders
- Current commander: General Roman Vitaliyovych Białostotsky

Insignia
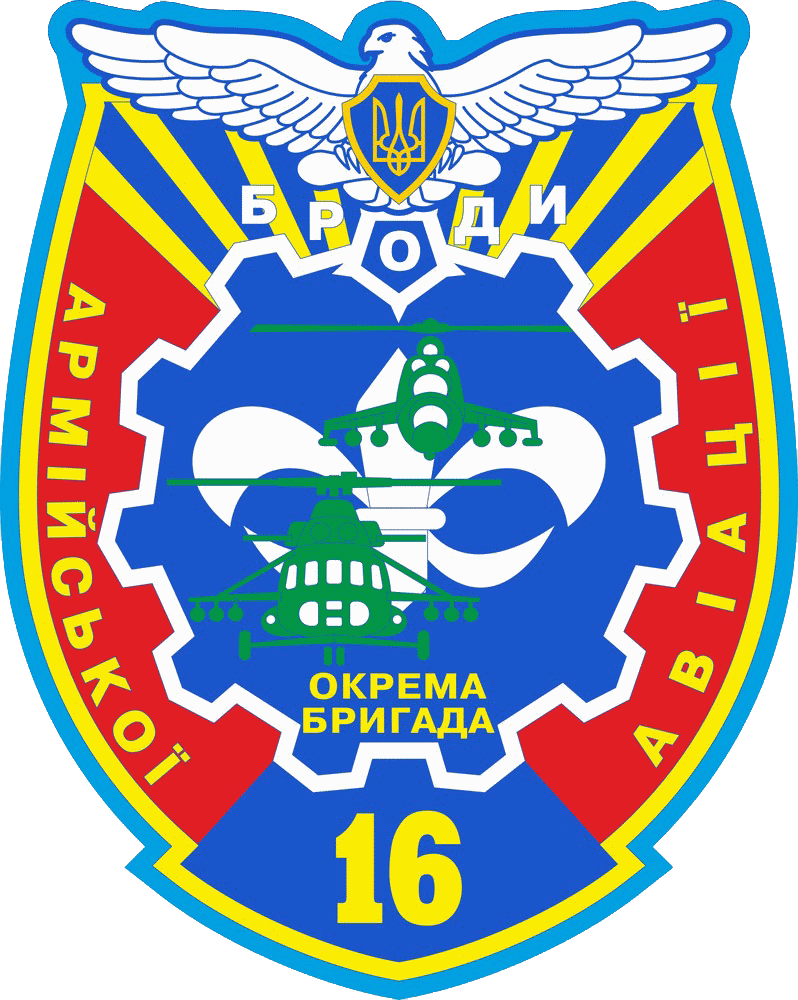
- Former Shoulderpatch

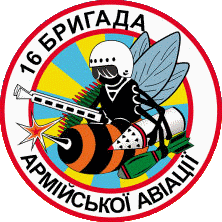
- Former Insignia

Aircraft flown
- Attack helicopter: Mi-24
- Multirole helicopter: Mi-8, Mi-2

The 16th Army Aviation Brigade Brody is a brigade of the Ukrainian Ground Forces.

== History ==
The Brigade was founded as the Soviet 119th Separate Helicopter Regiment on 30 May 1981, in Brody, Lviv Oblast. Following the collapse of the USSR, it was transferred to the Ukrainian armed forces. In October 1993, the regiment participated in the first military exercises of the restored Ukrainian army. On 26 August 1994, the 119th Regiment was reorganized into the 3rd Army Aviation Brigade, consisting of two helicopter squadrons and was later relocated to the 38th Army Corps.

In June 1995, the brigade started to participate in the UN peacekeeping mission in Yugoslavia. Since 1996, the brigade performed operations as part of the Partnership for Peace program and was deployed as a part of the Kosovo Force. On October 1, 1998, the brigade was subordinated to the Operational Command West. In December 2003, it became the 3rd Separate Army Aviation Regiment of the Western Ukraine was created on the basis of the brigade. On August 26, 2004, the regiment underwent restructuring and became a Brigade. The following year, in 2005, the Brigade was moved to the 8th Army Corps, and it has been a part of this corps ever since. The brigade's base was used to train personnel for the first rotation of the Ukrainian peacekeeping contingent of MONUSCO, and personnel of the brigade took part in MONUSCO as well as the United Nations Mission in Liberia. As of 2013, 6 Mi-24 and 8 Mi-8 and more than 300 personnel of the brigade were participating in peacekeeping operations. November 2010 marked the 15th anniversary of its establishment. As of 2012, the regiment had participated in 21 UN peacekeeping missions since June 1995.

In December 2012, it was reorganized into the 16th separate army aviation brigade.

=== Russo-Ukrainian-War ===
The brigade took an active part in the War in Donbas. On May 2, 2014, the largest operation of Ukrainian army aviation since the beginning of the conflict was carried out, a number of militant checkpoints around Sloviansk were destroyed and the city was besieged. The exact number of helicopters involved is unknown, but Russian sources claimed that about 20 aircraft were observed. 2 Mi-24 helicopters of the brigade were shot down in this 2 May operation during the Siege of Sloviansk. The Mi-24P Yellow 09 was flying over Sloviansk with its task being to provide support to Ukrainian columns that were advancing towards the city. At around 3:00 am, it was in the sky over Karpivka at an altitude of approximately 600 meters. At this time, a MANPADS was fired at it but it missed, almost simultaneously a second missile was fired, scoring a hit. It caught fire, began to spin, fell almost vertically, and fell near a pond near Karpivka. There were some claims that the second hit was scored by a grenade launcher. Another helicopter, the Mi-24P Yellow 40, went to the aid of the first helicopter, but was also hit by MANPADS. The entire crew of Major Ruslan Plokhodko, Major Oleksandr Sabada, Captain Mykola Topchiy were killed in action. On June 24, an Mi-8 MT helicopter, under the command of Lieutenant Colonel Andriy Belkin, delivered cargo to the forces in the Sloviansk region and picked up a group of specialists from the Security Service of Ukraine who were installing telecommunications equipment in the ATO zone. After taking off from Mount Karachun at about 17:10, the helicopter was shot down by separatists using MANPADS killing nine people aboard including two belonging to the brigade, Lieutenant Colonel Belkin Andriy Volodymyrovych and Major Mazunov Ruslan Aleksandrovich. Another Mi-8 was shot down on 7 August 2014 near Berezovo. On 25 August 2015, during the Independence March to celebrate the 24th anniversary of Ukraine's Independence, President of Ukraine Petro Poroshenko presented the brigade with a battle flag and the award "For Courage and Bravery". On January 11, 2016, a serviceman of the brigade, Roman Bogdanovich Kozodiy, was killed. On 24 August 2017, the brigade was awarded the honorary name "Brody" and a battle banner, the next day. On 29 May 2019 at 23:27 during a night training flight as part of the exercises "Day-Night", contact was lost with an Mi-8 helicopter of the brigade near the village of Sestryatyn, Rivne Oblast. It was reported that two helicopters flew over the village, one of them caught fire while still in the air and fell, no explosion was heard, only a flash was seen. As a result of the crash, four crew members including brigade commander Colonel Mazepa Ihor Yaroslavovych, Popenko Vladislav Valeriyovych, Romaniuk Vasyl Myronovych and Datsyuk Pavlo Yuriyovych died.

=== Full scale invasion ===
On 28 February 2022, during the Russian invasion of Ukraine, an Mi-8 helicopter of the brigade was performing a combat flight mission to near Makariv was hit by a Russian missile. Colonel Grigoriev Oleksandr Oleksandrovich, Captain Nesteruk Dmytro Mykolayovych and Lieutenant Hnatiuk Vasyl Andriyovych were killed. On 8 March 2022, an Mi-24 helicopter of the brigade was shot down near the village of Kulazhyntsi, Brovary district after successfully destroying multiple Russian vehicles and tanks. Both pilots: Lieutenant Colonel Marynyak Oleksandr Myroslavovych and Captain Bezzub Ivan Romanovych were killed in the shootdown. On 31 March 2022, an Mi-8 helicopter LG the brigade attempted to evacuate seriously wounded personnel from the besieged Mariupol. The helicopter was shot down by Russian forces killing navigator, Denis Mikhailovich Badika, pilot Yuriy Volodymyrovych Tymus and flight engineer Ivan Volodymyrovych Vakhovsky. On April 5, 2022, another Mi-8 helicopter was shot down during a similar attempt and Colonel Vyacheslav Olegovich Voronyi was killed.

On 12 December 2025 the unit was awarded the Presidential Award For Courage and Bravery by the President of Ukraine Volodymyr Zelenskyy for the second time.

On 30 June 2026, a Mi-8 helicopter of the brigade was lost in Starytskivka, Poltava Oblast while attempting to shoot down a Russian Geran one-way attack drone, killing the crew of four consisting of commander Yuriy Voron, navigator Valentin Mukshinov, flight engineer Bohdan Khmil and aerial gunner Mykhailo Deryaga. The commander of the brigade, Colonel Oleg Starchenko stated that the brigade had sustained heavily losses, having lost thirty pilots in the four years of war.

== Structure ==
- 16th Army Aviation Brigade
- Headquarters
  - 1st Squadron
  - 2nd Squadron

== Commanders ==
- Colonel Yaremenko Igor Vitaliyovych (?-2018)
- Colonel Mazepa Igor Yaroslavovych (2018-2019 †)
- Lieutenant Colonel Bardakov Pavel Alekseevich (2019)
- General Roman Vitaliyovych Białostotsky (2019-)
