= 12th Army Aviation Brigade =

Ukrainian Ground Forces formation

12th Army Aviation Brigade (2016–present) 7th Army Aviation Regiment (1992–2016)
- 12-та окрема бригада армійської авіації
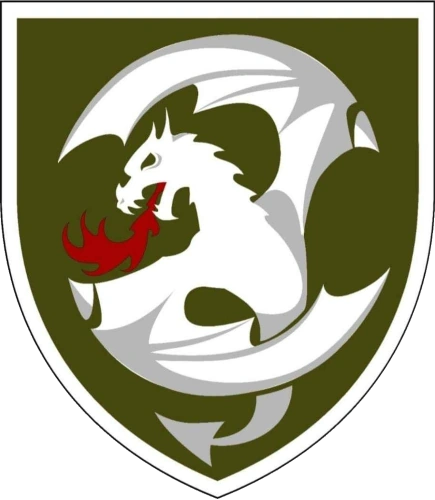
- Active: April 1943–present
- Country: Ukraine; Soviet Union (1944–1991)
- Allegiance: Armed Forces of Ukraine
- Branch: Ukrainian Ground Forces
- Type: Brigade
- Role: Army aviation
- Part of: Ground Forces Command
- Garrison/HQ: Novyi Kalyniv, Lviv Oblast
- Nickname: Viktor Pavlenko
- Patron: Viktor Pavlenko
- Engagements: Soviet–Afghan War; MONUSCO; Full scale invasion: Russian invasion of Ukraine
- Decorations: For Courage and Bravery
- Website: Official Facebook page

Commanders
- Current commander: Colonel Dmytro Kulkevich

Insignia
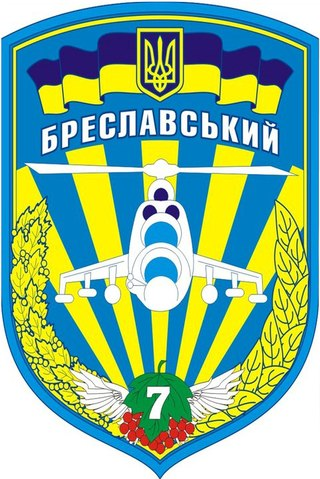
- Former Insignia (7th Army Aviation Regiment Breslavlsk)

Aircraft flown
- Attack: Mi-24
- Multirole helicopter: Mi-8
- Transport: Mi-2

The 12th Separate Army Aviation Brigade named after Corporal General Viktor Pavlenko (MUN A3913) is an army aviation formation of the Ukrainian Ground Forces. The brigade is directly subordinated to the Ukrainian Ground Forces command.

== History ==
The unit was formed as 340th Long-Range Aviation Regiment in April 1943 as transportation Regiment, going through a few name changes and eventually becoming the 340th Separate Transport and Combat Helicopter Regiment. From August 21, 1968 to June 1991 the Regiment was stationed in Czechoslovakia.

After Ukraine regained independence in 1992, the Regiment was redesignated to be 7th Separate Army Aviation Regiment. In 2016 it became the 12th Separate Army Aviation Brigade.

Since 1995, the regiment's soldiers have been participating in UN peacekeeping operations . Since then, the regiment has been active in peacekeeping in the former Yugoslavia, Sierra Leone, Iraq, Côte d'Ivoire, Liberia and the Democratic Republic of the Congo. From 2000 to 2004, individual the brigade's Mi-8 helicopters participated in firefighting operations in Turkey and Portugal. In 2002, a chapel in honor of the Demetrius of Thessaloniki was consecrated at the regiment's base.

=== Russo-Ukrainian War ===
In March 2014, a part of the combined aviation detachment of the 7th separate army aviation regiment was deployed for combat duty at the Chornobaivka Air Base, and the combined aviation detachment of the regiment has been deployed to carry out combat duty at the Chernihiv Air Base and the Myrhorod Air Base. The regiment took part in the First Battle of Donetsk Airport, to distract attention from the transport helicopters, 3 Mi-24s passed by the airport terminals. At the same time, the soldiers at the terminal was ordered to provide cover for the helicopters, since Russian forces had already shot down 3 Ukrainian combat helicopters near Sloviansk in May. As one of the helicopters passed, a special forces officer saw a separatist aiming a MANPADS at the helicopter and gave the command to open fire, a sniper killed the Separatist who was aiming at the helicopter. Around 12:00, a contingent of Ukrainian special forces landed at the airport from Mi-8 helicopters, under the cover of the three Mi-24s of the regiment and took control of the perimeter and control towers. Then the three Mi-24s in coordination with Su-25s struck the New Terminal from cannons, and then with unguided missiles approaching the New Terminal. During the battle of Heorohiivka, the Ukrainian command understood that the battle was with regular units of the Russian army and called in air support and two pairs of Mi-24s from the 7th regiment were called in and one Mi-24P of the second pair was shot down due to a lack of coordination by the Pantsir S1 air defense system. Lieutenant Colonel Biryuk Oleg Mykolayovych and Rodionov Anton Alexandrovich were killed in the shootdown. Subsequently, the regiment was involved in combat duty at the airfields Dnirpo, Chuhuiv, Kharkiv, Svatove, Severodonetsk and Kramatorsk along with combat, transport and evacuation operations in the ATO zone. On 24 March 2014, near the settlements of Vinnytskie Stavy and Hrebinky, an Mi-24 of the brigade crashed during a flight from Myrhorod to Ozerne killing Lieutenant Rudenko Serhiy Mykolayovych and wounding two more. On August 29, 2014, two soldiers of the regiment, Dremlyukh Vyacheslav Anatolyovich and Ivkun Vasyl Dmytrovych were killed in the Battle of Ilovaisk.

The regiment's honorific Breslavlsk (Breslau) was removed on 18 November 2015 as part of an Armed Forces-wide removal of Soviet awards and honorifics.

In 2016 the Regiment became the 12th Army Aviation Brigade.

On 5 December 2020, by Decree of the President of Ukraine, the honorary title named after Corporal General Viktor Pavlenko was awarded to the brigade.

For the 2022 academic year, training flights were conducted by the brigade on January 11 and 12, 2022. The main tasks including increasing efficiency, morale, experience, checks, navigation, and coordination.

On 24 February 2022, at the start of the Full scale invasion of Ukraine, Senior Sergeant Oleksandr Harmatyuk of the brigade was killed in battle with Russian forces near the Antonivskyi Bridge in the Kherson Oblast. The brigade's HQ along with all the three other army aviation bases were struck on the first day of the invasion.

On 5 April 2022, a. Mi-8 of the brigade flew to Mariupol to alleviate the trapped personnel at Azovstal, the helicopter crew included Major Boris Goroshko, Captain Bohdan Chychura and Senior Lieutenant Vyacheslav Sindiy. During the mission, cargo was safely delivered to the trapped personnel and wounded were loaded onto it and it departed, during the return flight its tank was first shot through and then it was hit by a Russian missile. Major Borys Borysovych Goroshko and Senior Lt Sindiy Vyacheslav Yuriyovych were killed while Captain Bohdan's date remained uncertain. An accompanying helicopter of Lieutenant Colonel Oleksandr Shemet together with Oleksandr Lyashenko, transported ammunition, landed a reconnaissance group, and evacuated the wounded along the Mariupol-Dnipro route being fired upon by small arms and the TOR air defense system, but they accomplished the task, becoming the last aircraft to successfully evacuate personnel from Mariupol. [The brigade personnel also took part in the Battle of Kyiv and the Siege of Chernihiv. A pilot of the brigade, Maksym Shendrykov, who took part in these battles was killed in combat on 23 April 2022 in Donetsk Oblast . On 11 December 2022, a pilot of the brigade, Maksym Fedorov, flying an Mi-8 was killed during the Battle of Bakhmut. On 12 March 2024, senior pilot Bakun Andriy Vasilyevich was severely wounded while flying on a combat mission and died of injuries.

On 30 September 2025 the unit was awarded the Presidential Award For Courage and Bravery by the President of Ukraine Volodymyr Zelenskyy and ceremonially receiving the award on the Day of the Armed Forces of Ukraine on 6 December 2025.

== Deployments ==
Since November 2007, 300 members of the Regiment are deployed to Liberia, supporting the United Nations Mission in Liberia, as part of the 56th Separate Helicopter Unit.

== Structure ==
During the 1970s the Regiment included 4 Squadron's with a total of 55-60 helicopters.

In 2004 the Brigade consisted of 2 Squadron's flying Mi-24, Mi-26 and Mi-8 helicopters.

2nd Squadron is intended to carry out missions under UN and NATO command.

== Equipment ==
Equipment in 2004

- Mi-24B - 6
- Mi-24P - 15
- Mi-24VP - 3
- Mi-24R - 3
- Mi-24K - 7
- Mi-8T - 26
- Mi-8MT - 3
- Mi-8MTV-2 - 4
- Mi-9 - 6
- Mi-26 - 16
