= Ukrainian Army Aviation =

- Армійська авіація України
- The Army Aviation branch insignia
- Founded: 1992
- Country: Ukraine
- Type: Army Aviation
- Size: 4 Brigades
- Engagements: Sierra Leone Civil War; UNMIL; MONUSCO; Russo-Ukrainian War; War in Donbas; Russian invasion of Ukraine

Insignia
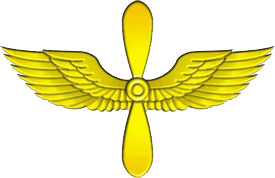
- Previous logos

- Roundel

Aircraft flown
- Helicopter: Mil Mi-2, Mil Mi-8, Mil Mi-24
- Trainer: Yak-52

The Ukrainian Army Aviation (Ukrainian: Армійська авіація України) is the military aviation branch of the Ukrainian Ground Forces.

== History ==
The first formations of army aviation in the revived Ukrainian were formed in 1992 when the former Soviet 119th Regiment joined the Ukrainian military.

Ukraine inherited from the Soviet Union a substantial force of helicopters: in 1993 the UAA had 266 attack, 304 support, and 100 transport helicopters in total, according to the International Institute for Strategic Studies (IISS), but by 2010, most were either in storage or unserviceable.

=== Russo-Ukrainian war ===
During the first four months of the War in Donbas in 2014, Ukraine suffered considerable losses, including four Mi-24 gunships and two Mi-8 helicopter transports. Due the widespread availability of surface-to-air missiles amongst the separatist militias, the UAA was forced to restrict the use of its assets. In the same year, the 16th Brigade participated in the liberation of Slovyansk.

While most of the Army Aviation fleet was old, the salaries were poor, and pilots received very few annual training hours (fewer than 44 hours in 2019, and only 50 in 2020), their combat experience during the War in Donbas and peacekeeping operations in Africa as part of United Nations missions in Liberia , Sierra Leone and the Democratic Republic of Congo (DRC), along with several Ukrainian pilots and ground crews having worked as private military contractors in Chad, Ivory Coast, and Equatorial Guinea, made the UAA as one of the most battle-hardened elements of the Ukrainian Armed Forces prior to the Russian invasion of Ukraine in 2022.

During the invasion, the UAA Mi-24s conducted ground attacks against advancing Russian columns, while Mi-8s (supported by Su-24MRs or Mi-24s) took part during the siege of Mariupol, ferrying reinforcements and supplies for the beleaguered defenders and evacuating wounded personnel, until an increase in Russian air defenses made further resupply missions too dangerous. Overall, the UAA made 18 successful flights to Mariupol, delivering 30 tons of cargo, 72 soldiers, while evacuating 64 wounded. Sixteen of these missions ended with the safe return of its crews, while three helicopters were written off.

In 2024, the 11th Army Aviation Brigade began operating a small number of fixed-wing aircraft such as the Yak-52 for countering Russian drones.

=== International missions ===
From 2004 until 2018, eight Mi-8s and six Mi-24 were deployed in Liberia as part of the United Nations Mission in Liberia (UNMIL) where they flew a total of 55,000 sorties logging over 60,000 flight hours.

Between 2012 and 2018, Ukrainian helicopter crews flew more than 3,000 combat sorties as part of the United Nations Organization Stabilization Mission in the Democratic Republic of the Congo (MONUSCO) mission in the DRC. Following the Russian invasion in 2022, Ukraine recalled its eight Mi-8s deployed in Congo.

== Structure ==
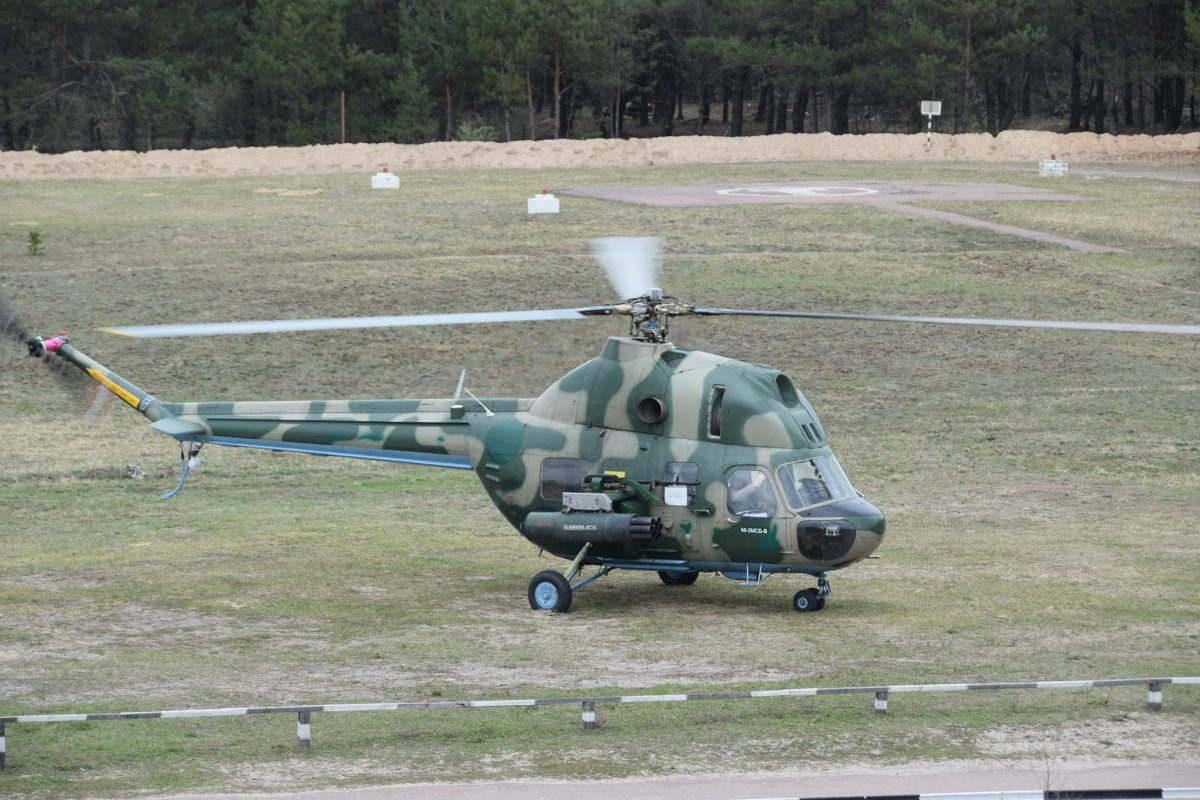
A Mi-2MSB

Structure:

- 8th Command Post, Chernihiv
- 11th Separate Army Aviation Brigade "Kherson", Kherson International Airport (Chornobaivka) attached to Operational Command South
  - 1st Squadron (Mi 2, Mi-8 & Mi-24)
  - 2nd Squadron (Mi 2, Mi-8 & Mi-24)
- 12th Separate Army Aviation Brigade "Maj Gen Viktor Pavlenko", Novyi Kalyniv Air Base attached to Operational Command East
  - 1st Squadron (Mi 2, Mi-8 & Mi-24)
  - 2nd Squadron (Mi 2, Mi-8 & Mi-24)

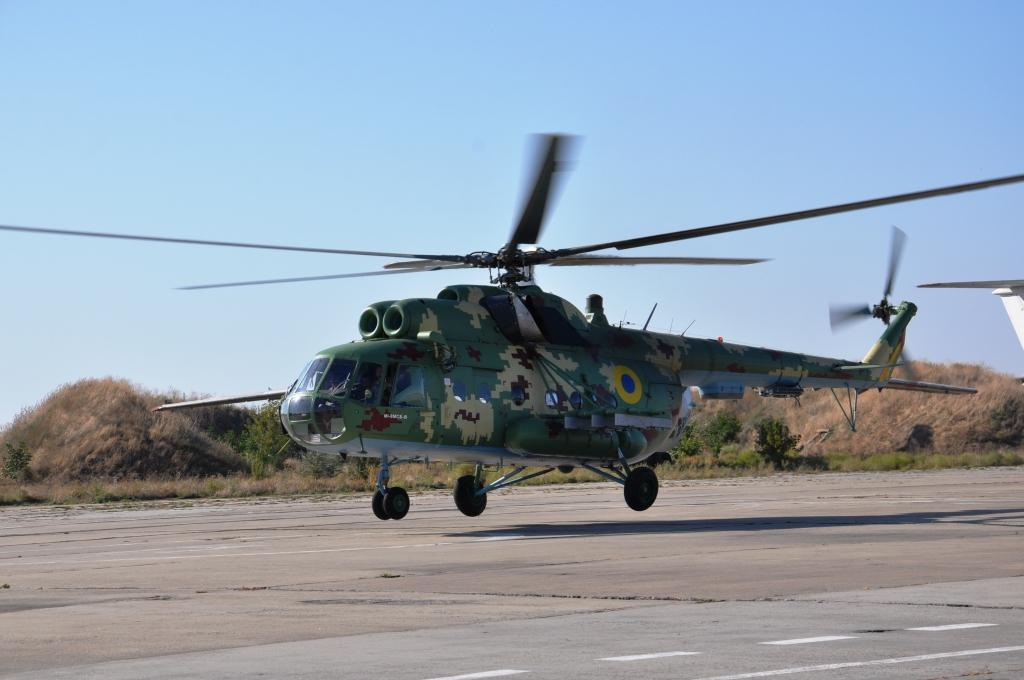
A Mi-8MSB-V

- 16th Separate Army Aviation Brigade "Brody", Brody Air Base attached to Operational Command North
  - 1st Squadron (Mi 2, Mi-8 & Mi-24)
  - 2nd Squadron (Mi 2, Mi-8 & Mi-24)
- 18th Separate Army Aviation Brigade "Ihor Sikorsky", Poltava Air Base attached to Operational Command West (formed 2015)
  - 1st Squadron (Mi-2)
  - 2nd Squadron (Mi-8)
  - 3rd Squadron (Mi-24)
  - 18th Separate Helicopter Detachment supported MONUSCO, until 2022
- 57th Aviation Base, Brody Air Base

== Aircraft ==
The UAA operates overhauled Soviet-era Mi-2, Mi-8, and Mi-24 helicopters. Some of them were locally modernized as the Mi-2MSB, Mi-8MSB-V, and Mi-24PU-1 by Motor Sich, and the Konotop Aircraft Repair Plant (Aviakon).

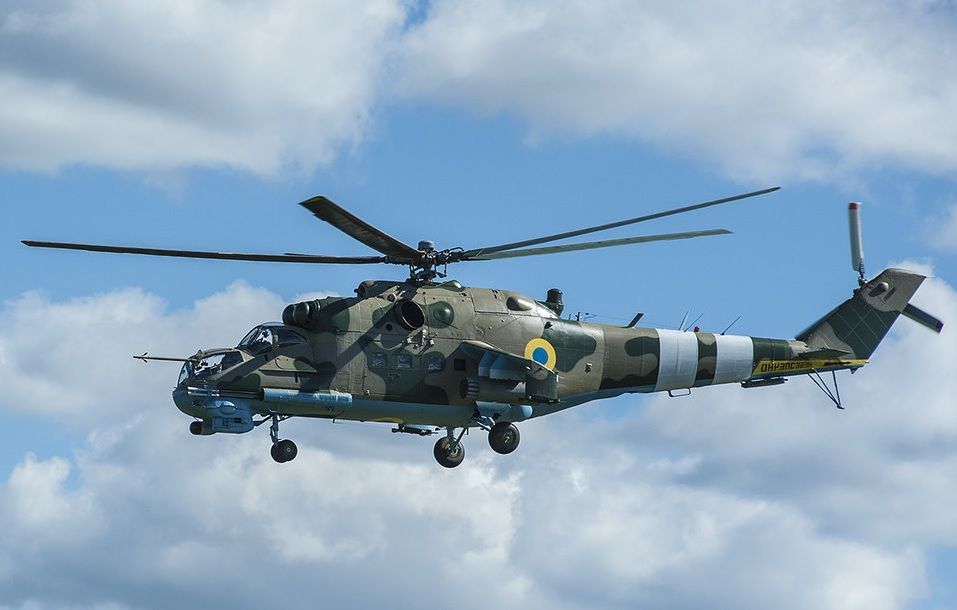
A Ukrainian Mi-24

In 1993, the IISS estimated that 223 Mi-24, 22 Mi-24R, and 21 Mi-24K attack, 36 Mi-6, 250 Mi-8, 9 Mi-24K, and 9 Mi-24P support, and 80 Mi-2 and 20 Mi-26 transport helicopters were in operation with the UAA. In 2010, the number of operational aircraft declined to 139 Mi-24s and Mi-8s.

In January 2022, Key.Aero estimated that the UAA had a total of 15 Mi-2s, 60 Mi-8s, and 60 Mi-24s. Some of these were non-operational at the time, while eight Mi-8s were deployed in the DRC to support the United Nations MONUSCO mission. Since then, these helicopters were recalled, while allied nations such as the United States and the Czech Republic donated helicopters to help Ukraine replenish its losses in combat. In December 2024, FlightGlobal estimated that the UAA had a total of 109 helicopters in active service.

=== Current equipment ===
Aircraft	Origin	Type	Variant	In service	Notes
Combat
Yakovlev Yak-52	Soviet Union	C-UAS		?	Operated by the 11th Army Aviation Brigade.
Helicopters
Mil Mi-8	Soviet Union	Utility	Mi-8MT; Mi-8MSB-V	58	Some modernized by Motor Sich.
Mil Mi-17	Russia	Utility	Mi-17V-5	17	
Mil Mi-24	Soviet Union	Attack	Mi-24PU-1 Mi-24D/P/V Mi-25/35	39	Some modernized by Aviakon.
Trainers
Mil Mi-2	Poland	Utility	Mi-2; Mi-2MSB	12	Most were modernized by Motor Sich.

=== Former equipment ===
The 12th Separate Army Aviation Brigade operated 4 Mi-26 heavy transport helicopters, they were withdrawn from service and placed in storage around the 2000s. The UAA also had a number of Mi-9 flying command posts (though they were used for training or transport instead). The UAA also operated Mi-6T transport helicopters.

== Bibliography ==
- Cooper, Tom; Fontanellaz, Adrien; Sipos, Milos (2024). War in Ukraine: Volume 6: The Air War February-March 2022. Helion and Company. ISBN 978-1-80451-698-0.
- Galeotti, Mark (2019). Armies of Russia's War in Ukraine. Bloomsbury USA. ISBN 978-1-4728-3344-0.
- Hoyle, Craig (2024). World Air Forces 2025. FlightGlobal (Report). London: Flight Global Insight.
- International Institute for Strategic Studies (1 January 1993). "Non‐NATO Europe". The Military Balance. 93 (1). Taylor & Francis: 66–92. doi:10.1080/04597229308460053. ISSN 0459-7222.
- International Institute for Strategic Studies (11 February 2025). "Chapter Four: Russia and Eurasia". The Military Balance. 125 (1). Taylor & Francis: 152–205. doi:10.1080/04597222.2025.2445476.
- Wragg, David (2011). The World Air Power Guide. Casemate Publishers. ISBN 978-1-84468-784-8.
