= Aryeh Leib Bernstein =

First and only Chief Rabbi of Galicia (1708–1788)

Rabbi Aryeh Leib Bernstein

Personal life
- Born: 1708 Brody, Polish–Lithuanian Commonwealth
- Died: 22 October 1788 (aged 79–80) Brody, Polish–Lithuanian Commonwealth
- Spouse: Chaya Zamosc
- Children: Reise; Rachel; Jacob; Wolf; Benjamin
- Parent: Isaac Issachar Rabinowitz-Babad (father)

Religious life
- Religion: Judaism

Aryeh Leib Bernstein (1708 – October 22, 1788) was the first and only Chief Rabbi of Galicia.

== Life ==
Bernstein was born in 1708 in Brody, in the Polish–Lithuanian Commonwealth. His father Issacher Ber was a rabbi who served as rabbi of Kehillat Ḥayyatin ("Congregation of the Tailors") in Brody, was rosh ha-medinah ("head of the province") of Brody, a trustee of the Council of Four Lands and parnas of Rydzyna Province. His paternal grandmother, Surah Babad, was the great-granddaughter of two prominent Talmudists, Avraham Yehoshua Heschel on her paternal side and Shabbatai HaKohen on her maternal side.

Bernstein was briefly rabbi of Zbaraz as a young man, after which he returned to Brody and entered commerce. In the 1740s, Brody was a in time of economic prosperity and its Jews were establishing commercial links abroad, with Bernstein concentrating a large a large part of trade in his hands.

In 1776, Austrian Empress Maria Theresa (who seized the province of Galicia in 1772 during the First Partition of Poland) issued an ordinance that the Galician Jews appoint a Chief Rabbi stationed in the Galician capital of Lemburg. Three candidates were proposed for the position: the Rabbi of Prague Yechezkel Landau, the Rabbi of Berlin Zebi Hirsch, and Bernstein. Landau was the top choice for the position, but the Jewish community of Prague insisted Landau stay in Prague and refuse the office. After two years of negotiating, the government gave up on appointing Landau Chief Rabbi and gave the office to their second choice, Bernstein. He was not a prominent Galician rabbi, but shortly before the election for chief rabbi he hosted several monks traveling from Russia to Vienna and convinced them to speak on his behalf before the Empress. He wanted the position not for the honor itself, but for the influence and power of the office as well as a chance to gain further wealth.

Originally a wholesale merchant, Bernstein monopolized the entire grain trade in Brody and held almost all the leases on Jewish taxes. He was representative of the old autocratic Kahal rulers, and his tax policy proved very unpopular with almost all of the Galician communities. As Chief Rabbi, he had a lot of power over the various communities, especially in terms of nominating rabbis and butchers as well as raising taxes. He worked with various Brody merchants (including his brother Zwi Hirsh) in multiple money-raising plans. Quarrels developed between Bernstein and various Jewish guilds, with the Jews of Brody being particularly opposed to his position. At one point, when a fire spread to Bernstein's house, most of the local Jews refused to help extinguish the fire. In 1785, following official protests from all over Galicia, the district government began an inquiry into Bernstein's actions. The inquiry concluded the complaints were unjustified and based on purely personal motives, but in 1786 the government abolished the position of Chief Rabbi in light of the persistent opposition from the Jewish community. Bernstein was allowed to keep the title of Chief Rabbi, and he spent the last year of his life pursuing commercial pursuits while gradually withdrawing from public life and transferring his business to his sons Wolf and Benjamin.

Aryel married Chaya Zamoscz, daughter of Rabbi Zvi Zamoscz. At one point Yechezkel Landau (who was teaching at the Great Synagogue of Brody at the time) accused Bernstein's wife of adultery. This led to a violent dispute between the two rabbis and Landau was ultimately compelled to leave Brody. Bernstein's children were Reise (wife of the Rabbi of Tarnopol Agraham Broda), Rachel (wife of Rabbi Mordecai Halberstamm and great-grandmother of Amalia Freud), Jacob (Rabbi of Zbaraz and of the Tailors), Wolf (the great-grandfather of Zvi Hirsch Chajes), and Benjamin.

Bernstein died on October 22, 1788. He was buried in the aristocratic section of the Brody cemetery.
