= Brodie (disambiguation) =

Brodie is a given name and a surname.

Brodie may also refer to:

== Places ==
- Brodie, Moray, village in Moray, Scotland
- Brodie Castle, castle in Moray, Scotland
- Brodie railway station, a former station in Moray, Scotland
- Brodie Mountain, Massachusetts, United States
  - Brodie Mountain (ski area), an alpine ski area in Massachusetts
- Brodie, Ontario, one of the urban neighbourhoods of Sudbury, Ontario, Canada

== Other uses ==
- Clan Brodie, a Scottish clan
- Brodie baronets
- Brodie Bicycles, a Canadian bicycle manufacturer
- Brodies, Scottish law firm
- Brodie helmet, military helmet
- Brodie knob, attached to an automobile steering wheel
- Brodie landing system for airplanes
- Brodie abscess, medical term

== See also ==
- Brody (disambiguation)
- Brodiaea, genus of flower (cluster-lily), named after James Brodie
- Archaeoniscus Brodiei, Jurassic isopod named after Peter Bellinger Brodie
