= Fabius Mieses =

Galician writer, poet and philosopher of the Haskalah

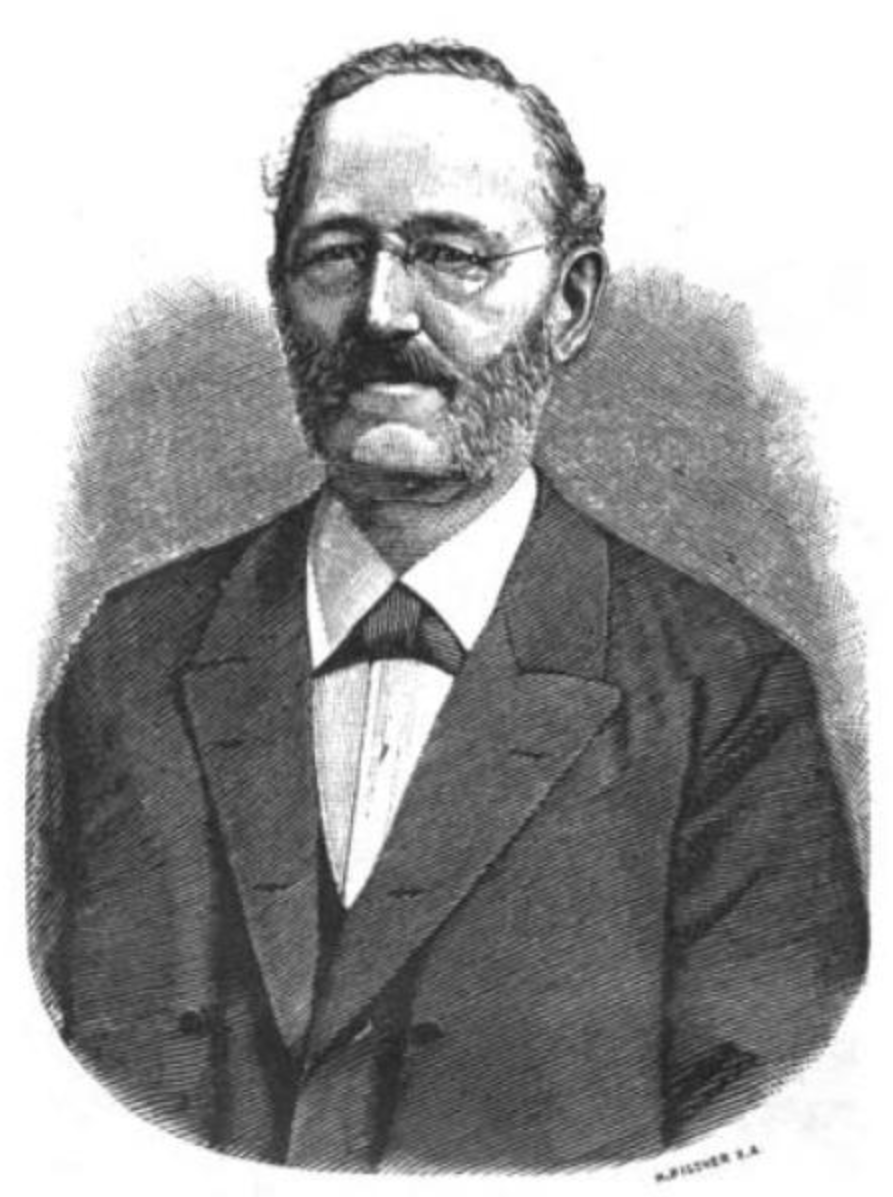
- Born: 31 October 1824; Brody, Kingdom of Galicia and Lodomeria, Austrian Empire
- Died: 10 October 1898 (aged 73); Leipzig, Kingdom of Prussia, German Empire
- Spouse: Sarah Mieses (née Mieses)
- Writing career
- Language: Hebrew, German
- Literary movement: Haskalah

Fabius Mieses (Yiddish: פֿאַבּיוס מיעזעס, Hebrew: פביוס מיזס; 31 October 1824 – 10 October 1898) was a Galician writer, poet, and philosopher of the Haskalah. Besides numerous published books, he frequently contributed poetry and articles to various Hebrew and German periodicals.

== Biography ==
Mieses was born in 1824 into a prominent Jewish family in Brody, the son of Sarah Geleh (née Redler) and Solomon Joshua ha-Kohen Mieses. His younger brother was chess master Samuel Mieses. At an early age he showed signs of great intellect, and was hailed as an illui. He received a thorough education; until the age of 15, he studied Hebrew literature exclusively. Among his teachers was David Lokaczer, a disciple of Nachman Krochmal. He later attended his grandfather Zalman Redler's beth midrash.

He lived in the house of his great-uncle (and later father-in-law) Isaac Mieses, a scholar living in Kraków, from 1840 to 1846. There he met, besides Solomon Judah Loeb Rapoport and other maskilim, his future teacher, M. Schöngut, who initiated him into the study of philosophy, and with whom he used to converse in Hebrew during their regular daily walks. At the same time, he assiduously applied himself to the study of German, French, Italian, Latin, mathematics, and astronomy.

Mieses wrote the first translation into Hebrew of the "To be, or not to be" soliloquy from Hamlet in 1842, based on a German translation by Moses Mendelssohn, but it remained unpublished until 1891. He published his first article, a critical review of his father-in-law's Wirren im Judenthum, in Zecharias Frankel's magazine Zeitschrift für die Religiösen Interessen des Judenthums in 1845.

In 1849 Mieses made his first trip abroad, to Leipzig, where he befriended Julius Fürst. He soon became assistant editor of and a regular contributor to Fürst's paper Der Orient. He moved to Breslau in 1854, where he met Heinrich Grätz, Abraham Geiger, Zecharias Frankel and Manuel Joël, and permanently settled in Leipzig in 1867. Mieses carried on a lively correspondence with B. L. Landau, and from 1877 was a close friend of Leopold von Sacher-Masoch, in whose literary magazine Auf der Höhe he published a polemical treatise on Jewish history.

He died at Leipzig on 10 October 1898.

== Work ==
In 1846, Mieses' German essay "Gegenwart und Vergangenheit im Judenthume" appeared serially in Fürst's periodical Der Orient. Later, between 1868 and 1871, he devoted a series of articles to the question of religious reform in the journals Ha-Maggid and Ha-Melitz, which were later published as the collection Hegyoni ha-tzofe. One article, Milḥemet ha-dat, presented an exposition of the thought processes leading to the German-Jewish Reform movement.

In 1878, Mieses published a didactic poem entitled Ha-emunah veha-tevunah (previously printed in Ha-Maggid), treating of Darwinism and its opponents. By this production, he gained for himself a prominent and lasting place among Hebrew poets. His most celebrated work was Korot ha-filosofyah ha-ḥadashah (first volume, Leipzig, 1887), a history of modern philosophy from Kant to Hegel. Since this work was the first treatise in Hebrew on modern philosophy, the author often had to create new terms and names for philosophical concepts. A second and third volume of the work remained in manuscript. According to Eliezer Goldman, the treatise likely influenced the philosophical views of Abraham Isaac Kook.

Other works by Mieses include Ha-kabbala veha-ḥasidut (Breslau, 1866; Odesa, 1871); Shirim (Kraków, 1891), a collection of miscellaneous poems; and Die Bibel der Vernunft (Leipzig, 1895).

=== Selected bibliography ===
- "Die Vergangenheit und Gegenwart im Judentum" [The Past and Present in Judaism]. Der Orient (in German). 1846.
- "Tikkun olam" [Repair of the World]. Ha-Karmel (in Hebrew). 1863–64.
- Ha-kabbala veha-ḥasidut [Kabbalah and Hasidism] (in Hebrew). Breslau: H. Sulzbach. 1866.
- "Milḥemet ha-dat" [The War of Religion]. Ha-Melitz (in Hebrew). 8 (39–44, 50–51). 1868. 9 (1). 1869.
- "Naḥalat Tzevi". Ha-Maggid (in Hebrew). 14 (11–17). 1870.
- Hegyoni ha-tzofe [The Observer's Logic] (in Hebrew). Odesa: L. Nitzche. 1871.
- Ha-emunah veha-tevunah [Faith and Wisdom] (in Hebrew). Lyck: Rudolph Siebert. 1878.
- "Das Judentum der Vergangenheit" [Judaism of the Past]. Auf der Höhe (in German). 1886. Published in Hebrew in Ha-Mitzpe, 1886.
- Korot ha-filosofyah ha-ḥadashah [History of Modern Philosophy] (in Hebrew). Leipzig: Moritz Schäfer. 1887.
- Kevutzat shirim [Collected Poetry] (in Hebrew). Kraków: Josef Fischer. 1891.
- Die Bibel der Vernunft [The Bible of Reason] (in German). Leipzig: C. W. Vollrath. 1895.
