= Battle of Brody (disambiguation) =

There were multiple major battles fought in the vicinity of the town of Brody in what is now Ukraine:

- Battle of Brody (1863), part of the January Uprising
- Battle of Brody (1920) during the Polish–Bolshevik War
- Battle of Brody (1941) during Operation Barbarossa
- Battle of Brody (1944) during the Lvov–Sandomierz Offensive of World War II
