= Nathan Michael Gelber =

Galician Jewish historian (1891–1966)

Nathan Michael Gelber (Hebrew: נתן מיכאל גלבר; May 27, 1891 – September 24, 1966) was a Galician Jewish historian, author, and Zionist activist who worked in Austria and Israel.

== Life ==
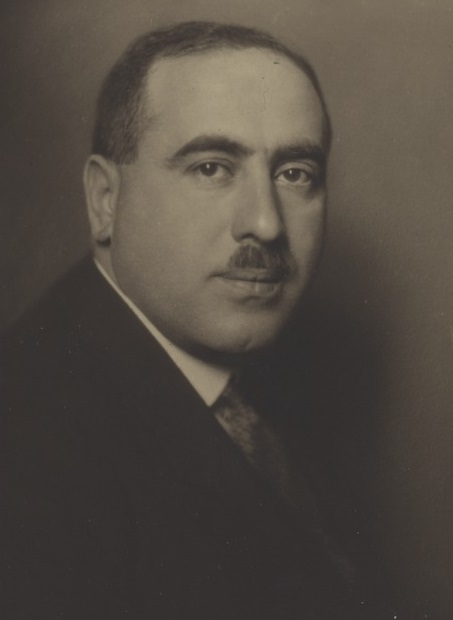
Nathan Michael Gelber in 1930

Gelber was born on May 27, 1891, in Lviv, Galicia, Austria-Hungary, the son of Nachman Gelber.

Gelber moved to Brody with his family in 1901. He graduated from the Brody high school in 1910, after which he began studying history and philosophy at the University of Berlin and the University of Vienna. He received a Ph.D. from the latter university in 1914. He then fought in World War I as a lieutenant in the Austro-Hungarian Army, serving in Serbia and Italy and receiving several war medals. He returned to Vienna in November 1918.

Gelber served as the general secretary of the East Galician delegation of Va'ad Le'umi in Vienna from 1918 to 1921. He then served as an active participant of the Austrian Pro-Palestine Committee and first secretary of the Austrian Zionist Organization from 1921 to 1930. He edited Wiener Morgenzeitung and Die Stimme during that time. He also co-founded the Academic Zionist Youth Organization in Galicia and Hatechiya in Vienna, was director of the World Zionist Congress Vienna office, served as secretary general of the 1927, 1929, and 1933 World Zionist Congresses, and edited Warsaw's Novoe Slovo from 1930 to 1931.

In 1934, Gelber moved to Mandatory Palestine and became director of Keren Hayesod's department of Jewish historiography. He lived and worked in Jerusalem. In 1948, he was seriously wounded in the bombing of the Jewish Agency building and remained blind in one eye for the rest of his life. He retired in 1954, after which he spent the last few years of his life devoted to Jewish scholarship.

Gelber began writing in 1910. He initially wrote historical and literary articles in Jewish newspapers all over Central and Eastern Europe. In 1919, he started publishing longer and shorter historical treatises in various Jewish serials in multiple languages all over the world. His pseudonyms included Stanislovski and Ben-Nakhman. He primarily investigated the history of Polish Jewry and forerunners of Zionism. He published close to a thousand books and articles in Hebrew, German, Yiddish, and Polish on Jewish history and contemporary Jewish life. He was also a contributor to, among other encyclopedias, the Juedisches Lexikon, the Encyclopaedia Judaica, and the Encyclopaedia Hebraica.

Gelber died in Jerusalem on September 24, 1966.
