= Brody Castle =

Castle in Brody, Ukraine

Coordinates: 50°05′08″N 25°08′16″E

- Бродівський замок
- Brody in Ukraine

Brody Castle (Ukrainian: Бродівський замок, romanized: Brodivskyi zamok) is a former fortress in Brody, in Lviv Oblast, Ukraine.

== History ==
The earliest documents referring to Brody Castle date back to the 1580s. Crown Hetman Stanisław Koniecpolski acquired the town in 1629 and built the castle between 1630 and 1635 under the supervision of the Italian architect Andrea del Aqua, based on a design by Guillaume Le Vasseur de Beauplan.

The castle withstood a siege by Cossack troops that lasted several weeks during the Khmelnytsky Uprising in 1648. During the Battle of Berestechko (1651), the fortress was a Polish military base that was used to hold captured Cossacks. The castle was strengthened during the 1660s, and was able to provide protection for the local population during the Turkish campaigns in 1672 and in 1676.

The castle was acquired by the Potocki family in 1704. Count Potocki rebuilt the castle in the rococo style for use as his private residence.

In 1772, after the First Partition of Poland, Brody town was withdrawn by Austria. Russian forces ravaged Brody during the War of the Polish Succession. At the order of the Austrian administration, most of the remaining fortifications were demolished by Wincenty Potocki in 1812: the ravelin, the clock tower, two bastions from the city side; the moat was filled.

In the aftermath of World War II, the castle housed a military unit, and at that time it was badly damaged due to reconstructions. The military unit left the fortress only in the 1990s. After that the palace facilities were transferred to the local school; there is also the regional archive and exhibition halls of the Brody Museum of Local History. The castle dungeons are still in ruins and are not used, that leads to considerable damages. The only surviving structure now is the much rebuilt two-storey palace of Stanislaw Potocki (1753–1805).

It is worth mentioning that there was once a beautiful park in front of the castle. Before the war, the Serwański family played a crucial role in managing and maintaining the park, becoming not only guardians of its natural wealth but also advocates of the idea of harmony between man and nature.

== Description ==
The castle was pentagonal in plan and included five bastions and curtain walls, with octagonal dungeons in the middle. It was surrounded by the deep moat. The total number of casemates in the castle was 75; they were used as barracks and warehouses. The governor lived in a wooden house in the castle grounds. This house, as well as a wooden chapel, remained until the middle of the 18th century.
