= Viktor Pavlenko =

Ukrainian military officer (1886–1932)

- Віктор Олексійович Павленко (Ukrainian); Виктор Алексеевич Павленко (Russian)
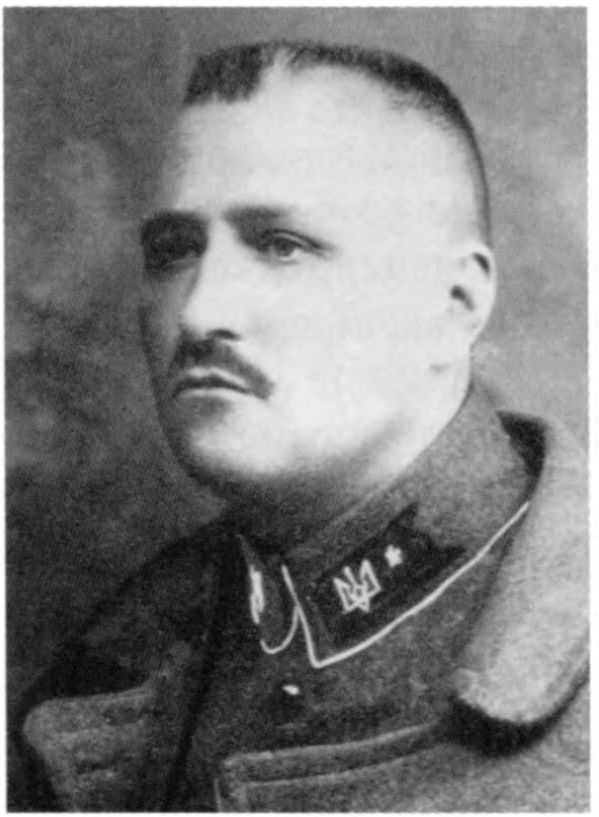
- Born: November 10, 1886; Kuban, Russian Empire
- Died: 1932; Kuban, RSFSR, Soviet Union
- Occupations: Military and political figure
- Years active: 1909–1926
- Military career
- Allegiance: Russian Empire; Ukrainian People's Republic
- Branch: Army, military administration, aviation
- Service years: 1914-1921
- Rank: Lieutenant colonel (Russian Empire); Cornet general (UPR)
- Commands: Ukrainian air forces (1918-1920); Kyiv Military District (1917); Minister of Defence (1921)
- Awards: Order of St. Anna; Order of St. Vladimir; Golden Weapon for Bravery
- Other work: Kolkhoz worker

Viktor Pavlenko (Ukrainian: Віктор Олексійович Павленко; Russian: Виктор Алексеевич Павленко; 22 November [O.S. 10 November] 1886–1932) was a Ukrainian military officer in the service of the Russian Empire and both the Hetmanate and the Ukrainian People's Republic.

== Biography ==
Born in the Kuban on November 10 (O.S.), 1886, Pavlenko finished the Chuguev infantry cadet school in 1909 with the rank of podporuchik (roughly equivalent to second lieutenant), rising to poruchik (lieutenant) the following year, while posted in Blagoveshchensk. In 1911 he decided to move on to aviation, first studying at a private flying school in Warsaw and in 1912 at the Sevastopol Aviation Officer School. He took part of World War I as a pilot, being involved in intelligence-gathering operations and at different points of the conflict appointed to the defense of the supreme headquarters (Stavka) in Mogilev and the Imperial residence, rising to the rank of lieutenant colonel in the Imperial Russian Air Service by 1916. In that year he was named commander of the air division of the Emperor's residence, and from March 1917 of the air division at Stavka.

After the February Revolution Pavlenko took part in the 1st All-Ukrainian Military Congress and later on was elected a member of the Central Rada of Ukraine. He took part in the "Ukrainianisation" of military units, and with the eruption of the Bolshevik revolution he became commander of the Kiev Military District in November 1917. The Rada, however, removed him from command in December. Nevertheless, with the rank of colonel of aviation, Pavlenko headed the air service of the Ukrainian People's Republic. He was replaced in this post after Skoropadsky came to power, but he continued serving in the Hetman's air forces. When Skoropadsky was, in turn, removed, he regained his former position. In 1920 he was promoted to cornet general, and between August and November 1921 he served as Minister of Defence of the UPR.

After the defeat of the Ukrainian armed forces, Pavlenko lived in internment in Poland. In 1926 he accepted an offer of amnesty from the USSR and returned to his native Kuban, in the RSFSR, where he worked in a kolkhoz. He died in 1932.

== See also ==
- Petro Franko

Military offices
Preceded by Marko Bezruchko as acting	acting Minister of Defence; 1921	Succeeded by
Preceded by post established	Commander of the Ukrainian Army Aviation; 1918-1920	Succeeded by post disbanded
Preceded by Mikhail Kvetsinsky	Commander of the Kyiv Military District; 1917	Succeeded by Mykola Shynkar
