= Brody Museum of History and District Ethnography =

Museum in Brody city, Ukraine

Coordinates: 50.0829°N 25.1472°E

Brody Museum of History and Local Lore
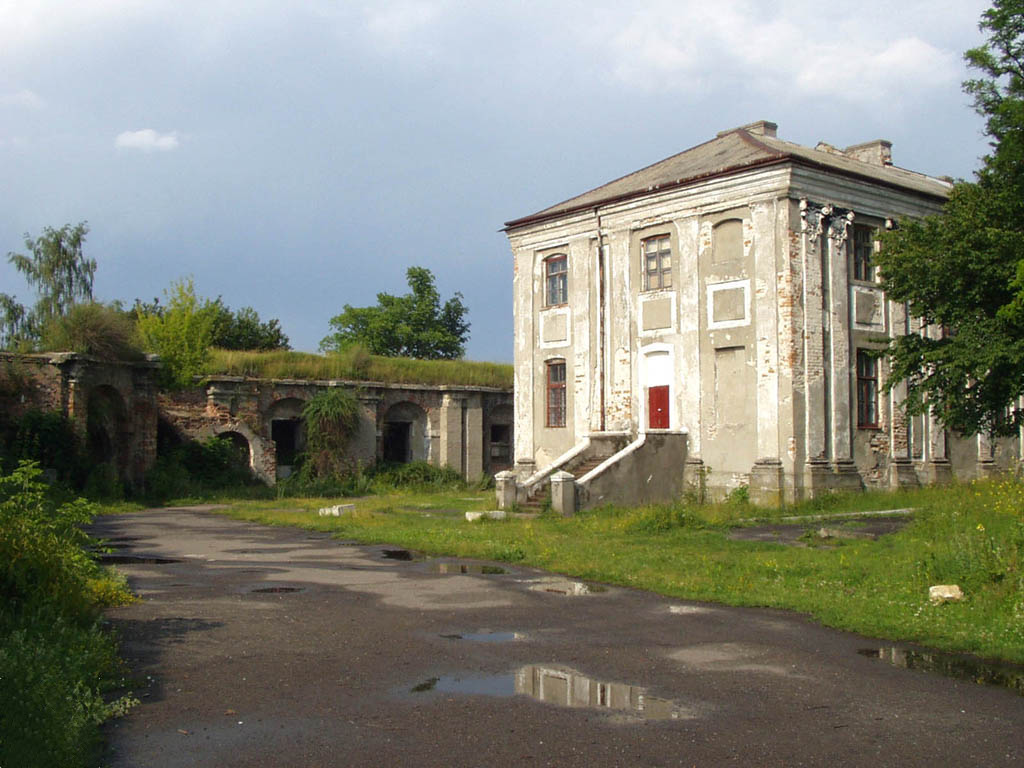
- Established: March 29, 2001
- Location: 5 Svoboda Square, Brody, Lviv Oblast, Ukraine
- Type: History and Ethnography

The Brody Museum of History and Local Lore is a museum in Brody city, Ukraine that was founded in 2001.

== History ==
Museums in former Brody Raion have old traditions. Those traditions are found in the collections of the Pidhirtsi Castle (the 17th-18th centuries), the collections of Count Vladimir Dzedushyckiy at his estate in the village of Penyaki (the end of the 19th century), a private museum of pictures and ancient furniture of a castle palace proprietress in Brody, Countess Zhyshchevska (the beginning of 20th century), and others. Unfortunately, as a result of military activities and social cataclysms, those collections were nebulized to different cities and museums of Ukraine and other countries. A lot of priceless artifacts were lost beyond retrieval.

The first district museum in Brody (district, meaning raion or regional) was created at the end of the 1950s. It was a one-story house on the street of Velyki Filvarky. Collections of numismatists, plain weapons, ceremonial objects, saved in the museum, document the 19th to the beginning of the 20th century ethnography of region. At the end of the 1960s to the beginning of the 1970s, however, the exhibition was closed down and a considerable part of the exhibits disappeared. Soon, the construction of a musical school began in the place of the museum.

In 1979 several apartments of the 18th-century building, in the walls of which from 1866 to 1939 was located Brody powiat government, were passed to occupy the museum. Between 1980-1984 a display was created and collection of exhibits passed. The opening of the new Brody Raion Museum that took place in September 1984 fell within the framework of celebrating the 900th anniversary of the first written reference of the Brody settlement. At first the establishment operated as a folk museum, and from April 1, 1991, became a department of the Lviv Historical Museum. On March 29, 2001, based on the Brody Raion Department of History and Ethnography of the Lviv Historical Museum, there was created the Brody Raion Museum of History and Ethnography.

== Displays ==
The museum display consists of 43 sections, built on the chronological principle in seven halls. The history of the district is divided by themes:

1. The most ancient times (from the Stone Age to the Kievan Rus)
2. Polish days (from the end 14th-18th centuries)
3. Region under the Austrian empire (1772–1918)
4. The First World War (1914–1918), national liberation movements (1918–1919), Polish-Soviet War (in 1920);
5. Inter-War period (1920–1939);
6. World War II (1939–1945), fight of OUN, UPA in Brody district (1940-50th).

Separately presented are "Nature of Brody district" and "Ethnography of district (from the end of the 19th to the beginning of the 20th century) ". The display is completed by a photo gallery with the types of sights of history and culture of Brody district, panorama "Brody XVII–XVIII century".

Activity of the known people the names of which are closely associated with the history of region is lighted in museum: I. Trush, M. Fedyuk, E. Lysyk (painters); Ya. Holovatskyi, J. Korzheniovskiy, T. Bordulyak, V. Hronovych, S. Tudor, J. Roth, L. Buchkovskiy (writers); of researches workers - V. Shtchurat (literary critic), J. Zastyrec (philosopher and philologist), O. Rozdolskiy (ethnographer), V. Yashtchun (Slavist and translator), S. Barontch and I. Sozanskiy (historians); O. Vyslockiy and M. Osadca (publicmen of district); F. West (the Polish publisher); M. Tarnavskiy, O. Stepaniv, R. Kupchynskiy, J. Vassyyan, P. Fedun-Poltava (figures of national liberation competitions).

About 5,000 exhibits are saved in the museum. Among them there are archaeological sights (over 1,500 items), collections of monies, signs, weapons, rewards, articles of folk culture and way of life, original pictures and documents. Materials include exhibits from history of the formation and battle actions of the legion of the Ukrainian Sich Riflemen, Ukrainian division "Galichina" (1st UD UNA), departments of UPA.

In sight of national value of the 17th to the 18th centuries – Brody castle are show-rooms of Brody museum of history and district ethnography. Here museums workers conduct exhibition activity, work above creation of constantly operating display from history of castle. The guides of Brody museum of history and district ethnography conduct surveying and thematic excursions by a display, by Brody castle, by historical-cultural sights of Brody and district. The museum is the organizer of searching-researches and ethnographic expeditions. The researches workers of establishment take part in the leadthrough of archaeological excavations, organize the district reading and conferences, give professional consultations.

Collection of postcard "Brody at the beginning of XX century", collection of historical photos "Ukrainian Sich Riflemen", "Small photo encyclopedia of Ukrainian Sich Riflemen" (in the collaboration with the Lviv researches workers), materials of district conference "Brody-920" are scientific reserves of Brody museum of history and district ethnography. Guide-book "Brody: the face of city" and booklet "Brody" are geared-up to the edition. Periodically in the local press district scientifically cognitive secret services are published from history of region, the authors of which there are the workers of museum.
