= Brody Air Base =

Ukrainian Army Aviation base in Brody, Lviv Oblast

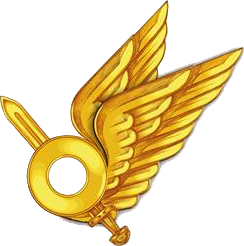
Brody
- Brody, Lviv Oblast in Ukraine
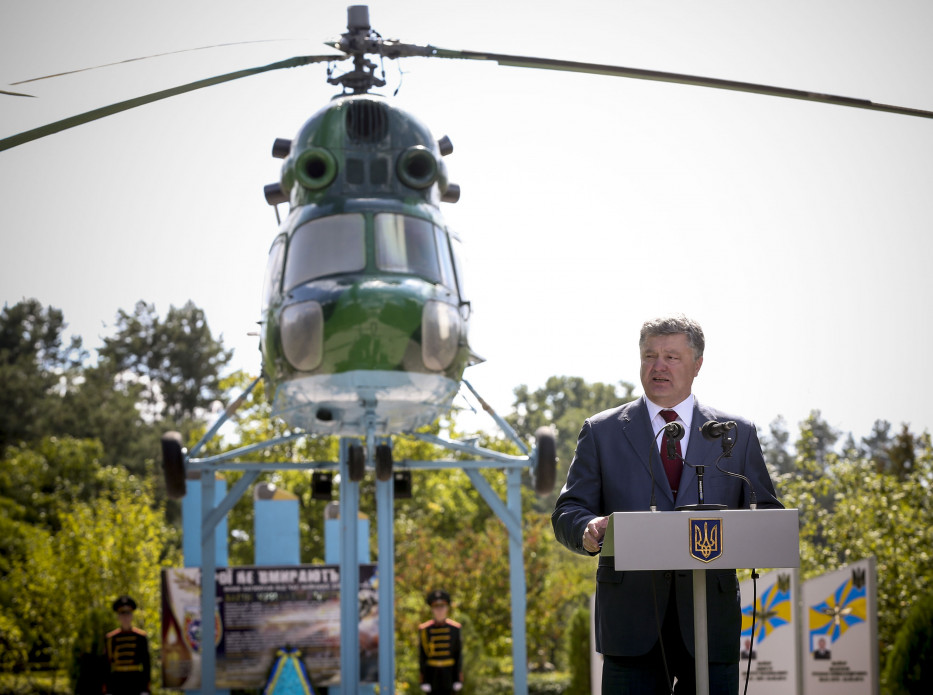

Site information
- Owner: Ministry of Defence
- Operator: Ukrainian Army Aviation
- Controlled by: 16th Separate Army Aviation Regiment

Location
- Shown within Lviv Oblast Brody (Ukraine)
- Coordinates: 50°8′0″N 025°10′0″E

Site history
- In use: Unknown - present
- Battles/wars: 2022 Russian invasion of Ukraine

Airfield information
- Identifiers: ICAO: UKBL
- Elevation: 240 metres (787 ft) AMSL
Runways
Direction	Length and surface
08/26	1,935 metres (6,348 ft) Concrete

Brody (ICAO: UKBL) is an air base of Ukrainian Army Aviation located near Brody, Lviv Oblast, Ukraine.

The base is home to the 16th Separate Army Aviation Brigade flying Mil Mi-8, Mil Mi-9 & Mil Mi-24 aircraft.

The base was used by the:

- 807th Assault Aviation Regiment which became the 807th Fighter-Bomber Aviation Regiment in 1956, it then became the 55th independent Helicopter Regiment in 1961. (August 1945 - April 1981)
- 119th independent Helicopter Regiment of the 13th Army (Soviet Union) (1981 - 1992)

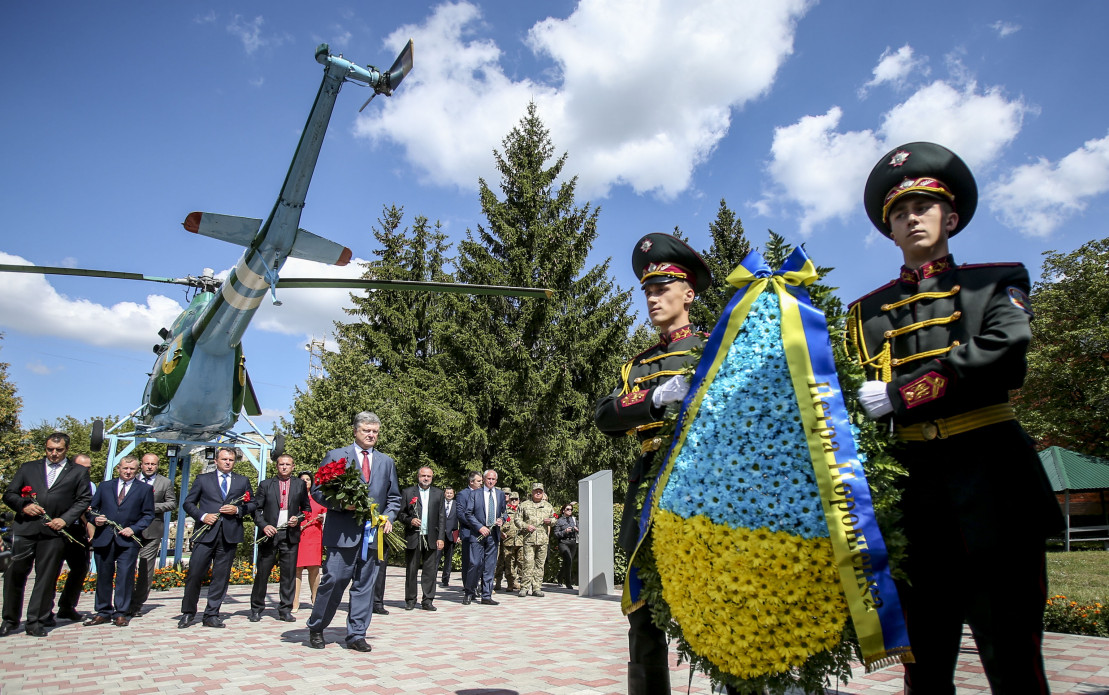
Petro Poroshenko on a working trip to Lviv region
