= Brody =

City in Lviv Oblast, Ukraine

Brody Броди
- City
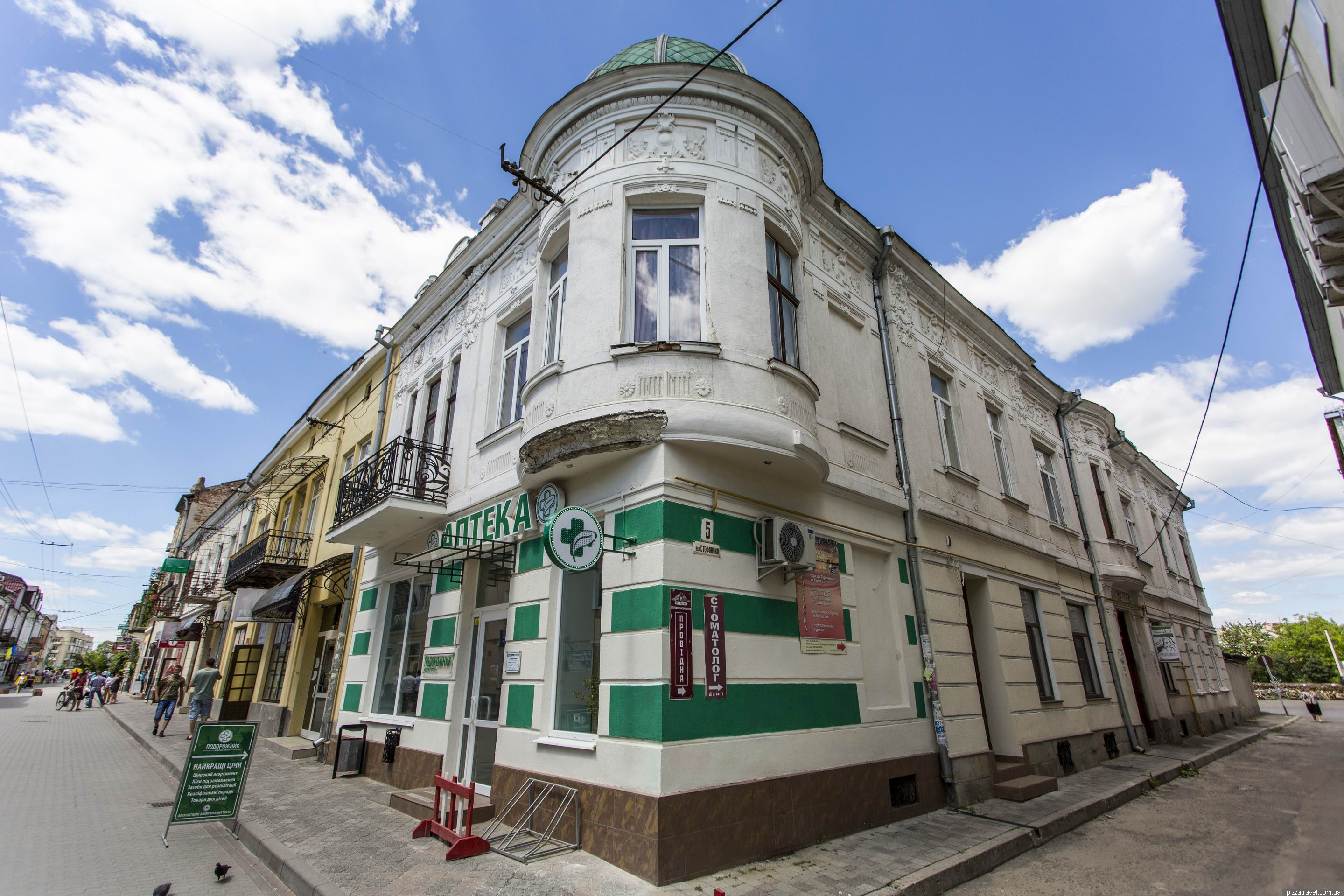
- A building in central Brody

- Flag Coat of arms

- Location within Lviv Oblast Location within Ukraine
- Coordinates: 50.083141°N 25.147651°E
- Country: Ukraine
- Oblast: Lviv Oblast
- Raion: Zolochiv Raion
- Hromada: Brody urban hromada
- Established: 1084
- Town rights: 1584

Area
  - Total: 8.67 km^{2} (3.35 sq mi)

Population (2022)
  - Total: 23,134
  - Density: 2,670/km^{2} (6,910/sq mi)

Brody (Ukrainian: Броди, IPA: [ˈbrɔdɪ]; Polish: Brody, IPA: [ˈbrɔdɨ]; German: Brody; Yiddish: בראָד, romanized: Brod) is a city in Zolochiv Raion, Lviv Oblast, western Ukraine. Located in the valley of the upper Styr River, about 90 kilometres (56 miles) northeast of the oblast capital, Brody hosts the administration of Brody urban hromada, one of Ukraine’s hromadas. Population: 23,134 (2022 estimate). The Druzhba and Odesa–Brody oil pipelines connect at Brody.

== History ==
The first mention of a settlement on the site of Brody is dated 1084 (Instructions by Vladimir Monomach). It is believed to have been destroyed by Batu Khan in 1241.

=== Polish kingdom ===
From 1441 Brody was the property of different feudal families (Jan Sieniński; from 1511, Kamieniecki).

Brody was granted Magdeburg town rights by Polish King Stephen Báthory by virtue of a privilege issued in Lublin on 22 August 1584. It was named Lubicz after the Lubicz coat of arms of the founder, Stanisław Żółkiewski, one of the most accomplished military commanders in Polish history (not to be confused with Lubech, Lubecz). The king also set up three annual fairs. These privileges were confirmed by King Sigismund III Vasa in 1597 at the Warsaw Sejm. Already in documents from 1598 the city appeared under the name Brody. It was a private town of the Polish Crown, owned by houses of Żółkiewski, Koniecpolski and Potocki.

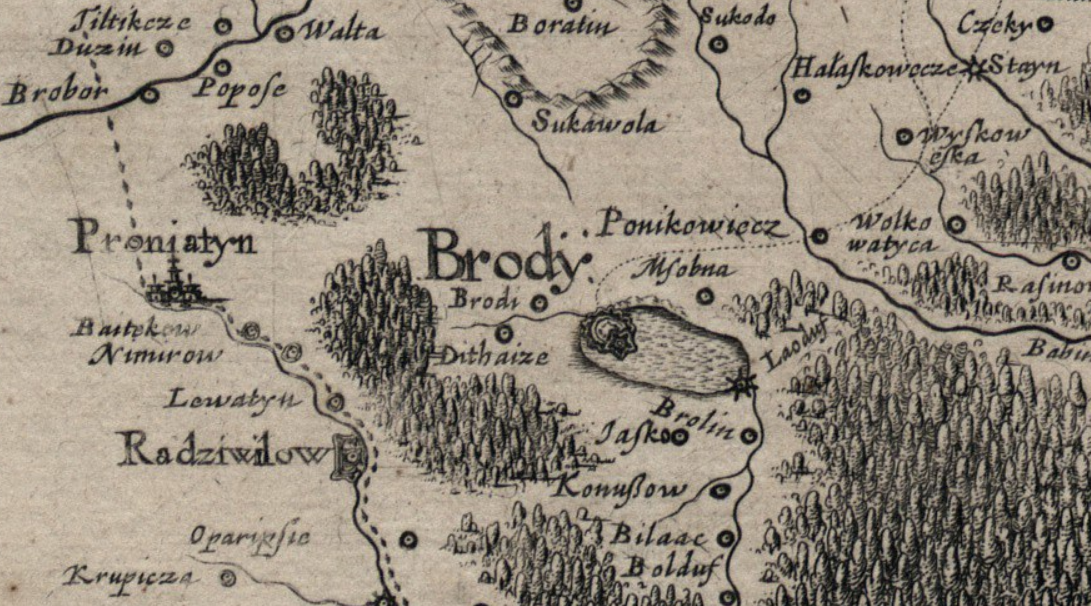
Brody on a Polish map from 1648

From the 17th century until the Holocaust the city was populated not only by Ruthenians and Poles but also by a significant number of Jews (70% of the town's population), Armenians, and Greeks. From 1629, the city became the property of Stanisław Koniecpolski, another of the most distinguished military commanders in Polish history, who ordered the construction of the Brody Castle. The castle, or rather the fortress, was designed by the French military engineer Guillaume Le Vasseur de Beauplan. It was one of the strongest fortresses on the route of frequent Tatar and Cossack invasions. King Władysław IV Vasa, wanting to reward and assist Koniecpolski in the construction of the fortress, issued a privilege in 1633 in Kraków that equated fairs in Brody with those in Lublin and Toruń, granted staple right and exempted city residents from taxes for 15 years. Under Koniecpolski’s patronage, the city flourished. In 1637 he founded a school that employed lecturers from the Kraków Academy, Poland's leading university. Its first director was Jan Marcinkowski. In 1643 he founded a silk and wool fabric manufacture in the city, one of Poland’s leading manufactories of this type. Koniecpolski died in Brody on 11 March 1646. On 30 June funeral ceremonies took place in Brody.

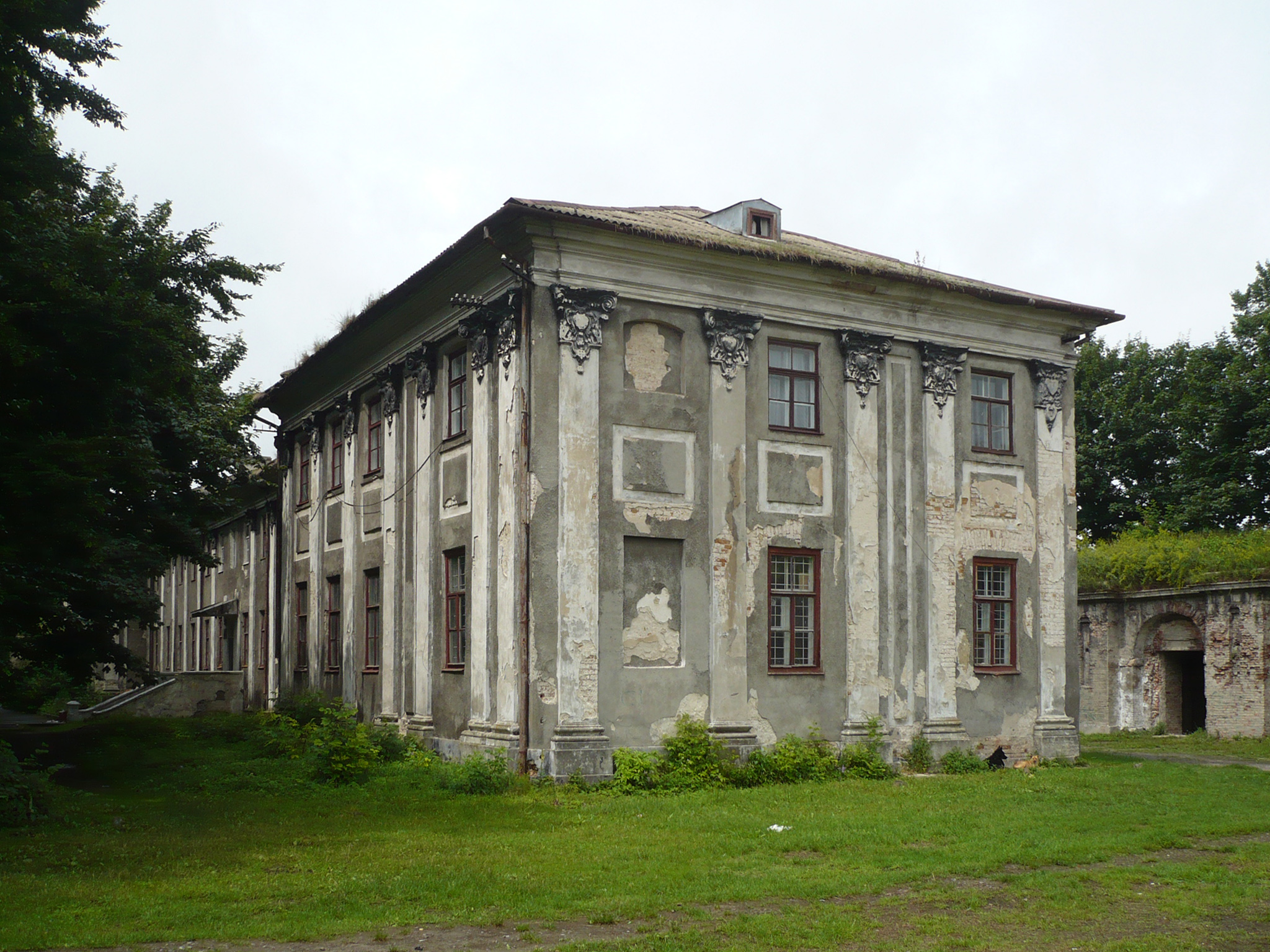
The deteriorating Potocki Palace today

In 1648, during the Cossack uprising, the castle took eight weeks for Bohdan Khmelnytsky to capture. Notably, according to the book History of the Rus, the town's Jewish population was spared after the sack. The Cossacks destroyed and plundered the city. Brody’s Jews were found not to have engaged in alleged maltreatment of the Orthodox Christian (Rus) population and were required only to pay a "moderate tribute" in kind.

In 1704, Brody was purchased by the Potocki family. In 1734, the fortress was destroyed by Russian troops. It was replaced by Stanisław Szczęsny Potocki's palace in the Baroque style.

=== Austrian Empire ===
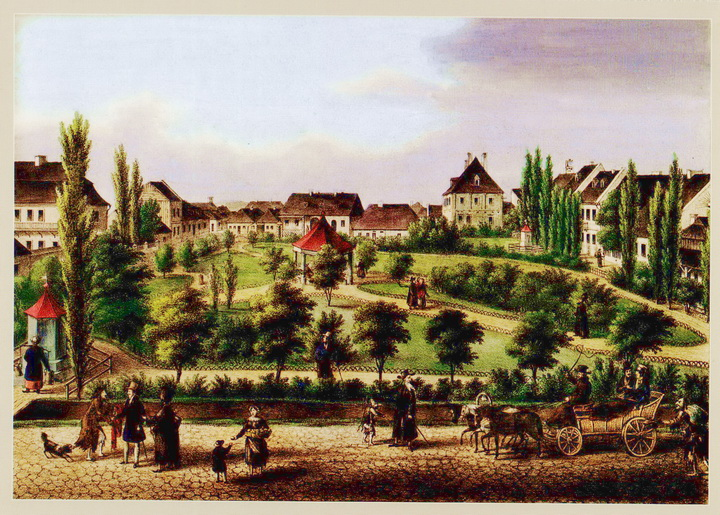
19th-century view of Brody

As a result of the First Partition of Poland, in 1772, Brody became a part of the Habsburg Empire (from 1804 the Austrian Empire). During the Austro-Polish War (part of Polish national liberation fights), on 27 May 1809, the city was captured by Poles without a fight. In 1812, Wincenty Potocki was forced by the Austrian government to remove the city's fortifications. During the first half of the 19th century Brody served as a major centre of trade between Austria and Russia. However, its importance started to decline following the construction of railways.

In 1817 a secondary school (Realschule) was founded in Brody, transformed in 1865 into a gymnasium. After the liberalization of Austrian policies in the Austrian Partition of Poland, after 1904 German was gradually replaced by Polish at this school.

=== Polish Republic ===
In 1919, Brody became part of the Second Polish Republic, after Poland regained independence a year earlier. It was the site of a battle during the Polish-Soviet War of 1920 and heavy destruction by both Polish and Russian forces, and is described extensively in stories of the Red Cavalry by Isaac Babel. Administratively Brody was the seat of Brody County located in the Tarnopol Voivodeship. Brody was an important military base, with the Kresowa Cavalry Brigade headquarters established there. In 1936, the People's University in Brody (Uniwersytet Ludowy w Brodach) was founded for farmers from the surrounding area. In 1931 the city's population comprised 12,000, a decline of almost 50%compared to 1880.

=== World War II ===
After the Soviet invasion of Poland, during World War II, in September 1939, Brody was occupied by the Red Army. The Soviets deported mainly Polish people deep into the USSR. Between 26 and 30 June 1941, a tank battle was fought nearby between the German Panzer Group 1 and five Soviet mechanized corps with heavy losses on both sides. From 1941 to 1944 it was occupied by Germany. During that period Brody held the headquarters of German Field Marshal Gerd von Rundstedt. The local Jews were murdered in the Holocaust (see below).

On 17-22 July 1944, Brody and nearby areas saw the battles of the strategically important Lvov-Sandomierz Operation (a.k.a. Brody Cauldron) where the Soviet Army successfully encircled and destroyed German forces, including troops of the Galicia Division. It was occupied by the Soviets again, and in 1945 annexed to the USSR.

=== Jews in Brody ===
Jews in Brody according to Austrian-Hungarian Census
Year	total pop.	Jews	Share
1869	18,700	15,138	80.9%
1880	20,000	15,316	76.3%
1890	n. a.	n. a.	n. a.
1900	16,400	11,854	72.1%
1910	18,000	12,150	67.5%

A crossroads and a Jewish trade center in the 19th century, the city is considered to be one of the shtetls. It was particularly famous for the Brodersänger or Broder singers, who were among the first to publicly perform Yiddish songs outside of Purim plays and wedding parties.

The promulgation of the May Laws, and the massive exodus of Russian Jews which was its result, took the leaders of Western Jewry completely by surprise. Throughout 1881, hundreds of immigrants kept arriving in Brody daily. Their arrival placed the existing Austrian and German-influenced ethnic Jews in a quandary. The comfortable middle-class Jewish community of Central and Western Europe looked instinctively to the Alliance Israélite Universelle, the world's largest and most respected Jewish philanthropic agency, to bring order out of chaos, to cope with the huge influx of newcomers.

Throughout centuries of Jewish life in Brody until the murderous events of the Holocaust, Jews and Gentiles lived a mostly segregated life, with distinct and separate social as well as religious life.

=== Holocaust in Brody ===
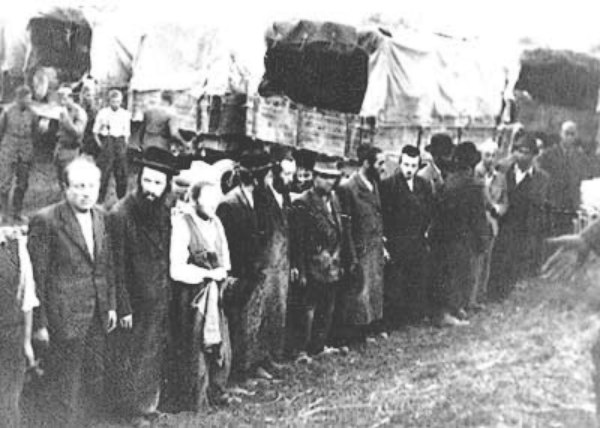
Jews in Brody detained by German Nazis and awaiting deportation, ca. 1942–1943

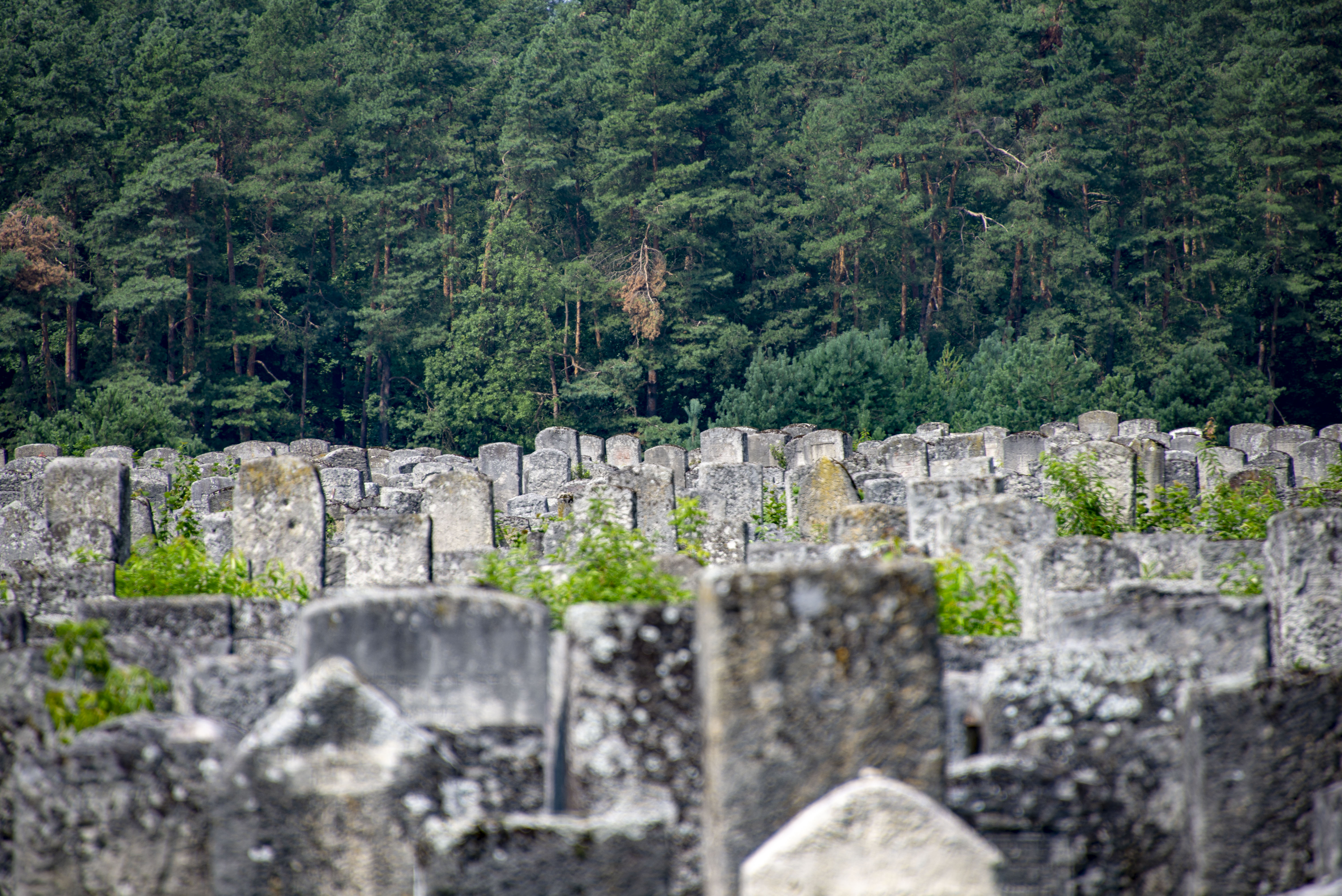
Jewish tombstones at New Jewish Cemetery in Brody. The Cemetery numbers ca. 20,000 burials

When German troops occupied the city on 1 July 1941, the Jewish population of some 9,000 was forced to wear an arm band with the yellow badge. Two hundred fifty intellectuals were arrested on 15 July 1941 and shot two days later at the Jewish cemetery after being brutally tortured. Encouraged by German occupation authorities, the Ukrainian population started a pogrom in August 1941, looting Jewish possessions. The Judenrat had to provide labor for repairs and maintenance on the roads and bridges as well as for work in army depots. From December 1941 young people were arrested on the streets and sent to forced labor camps in the vicinity.

In September 1942 the Aktion Reinhardt started in Brody, leaving 300 people dead. Two thousand people were deported to Bełżec where they would be murdered in the gas chambers. In December 1942 the German occupiers forced the Jewish population to resettle in a ghetto inside the town, where 6,000 people lived in January 1943. During 1943, Aktion Reinhardt was continued with thousands being killed in the nearby woods in March and April, the Ghetto being liquidated on 21 May 1943. More than 3,000 inhabitants were deported, presumably to Majdanek, but hundreds had already been killed in the Ghetto. Many houses were set on fire to drive out those who had remained hidden there.

=== After the war ===
During the Cold War, Brody air base served Soviet Air Force regiments, while the city was noticeably militarized. Parts of the city to this day are being referred to as Bili Kazarmy (the White Barracks) and as Chervoni Kazarmy (the Red Barracks).

The Brody Museum of History and District Ethnography was founded in 2001.

Until 18 July 2020, Brody was the administrative center of Brody Raion. The raion was abolished in July 2020 as part of the administrative reform of Ukraine, which reduced the number of raions in Lviv Oblast to seven. The area of Brody Raion was merged into Zolochiv Raion.

== Geography ==
=== Climate ===
Climate data for Brody (1981–2010)
Month	Jan	Feb	Mar	Apr	May	Jun	Jul	Aug	Sep	Oct	Nov	Dec	Year
Mean daily maximum °C (°F)	0.3 (32.5)	1.6 (34.9)	6.5 (43.7)	14.4 (57.9)	20.5 (68.9)	23.0 (73.4)	24.9 (76.8)	24.5 (76.1)	19.0 (66.2)	13.4 (56.1)	6.3 (43.3)	1.5 (34.7)	13.0 (55.4)
Daily mean °C (°F)	−2.5 (27.5)	−2.0 (28.4)	2.1 (35.8)	8.5 (47.3)	14.3 (57.7)	17.1 (62.8)	18.8 (65.8)	18.1 (64.6)	13.3 (55.9)	8.5 (47.3)	2.9 (37.2)	−1.4 (29.5)	8.1 (46.6)
Mean daily minimum °C (°F)	−5.9 (21.4)	−5.4 (22.3)	−1.8 (28.8)	3.1 (37.6)	8.3 (46.9)	11.4 (52.5)	13.1 (55.6)	12.4 (54.3)	8.4 (47.1)	4.3 (39.7)	−0.2 (31.6)	−4.4 (24.1)	3.6 (38.5)
Average precipitation mm (inches)	32.8 (1.29)	39.7 (1.56)	39.7 (1.56)	46.6 (1.83)	75.5 (2.97)	90.2 (3.55)	104.7 (4.12)	70.0 (2.76)	67.5 (2.66)	45.2 (1.78)	41.1 (1.62)	42.0 (1.65)	695.0 (27.36)
Average precipitation days (≥ 1.0 mm)	9.2	10.2	9.5	8.5	10.7	11.8	10.7	8.7	8.8	8.3	9.6	10.7	116.7
Average relative humidity (%)	80.9	80.9	76.7	69.4	69.4	72.8	74.2	74.8	78.7	79.2	82.7	83.5	76.9
Source: World Meteorological Organization

== Gallery ==
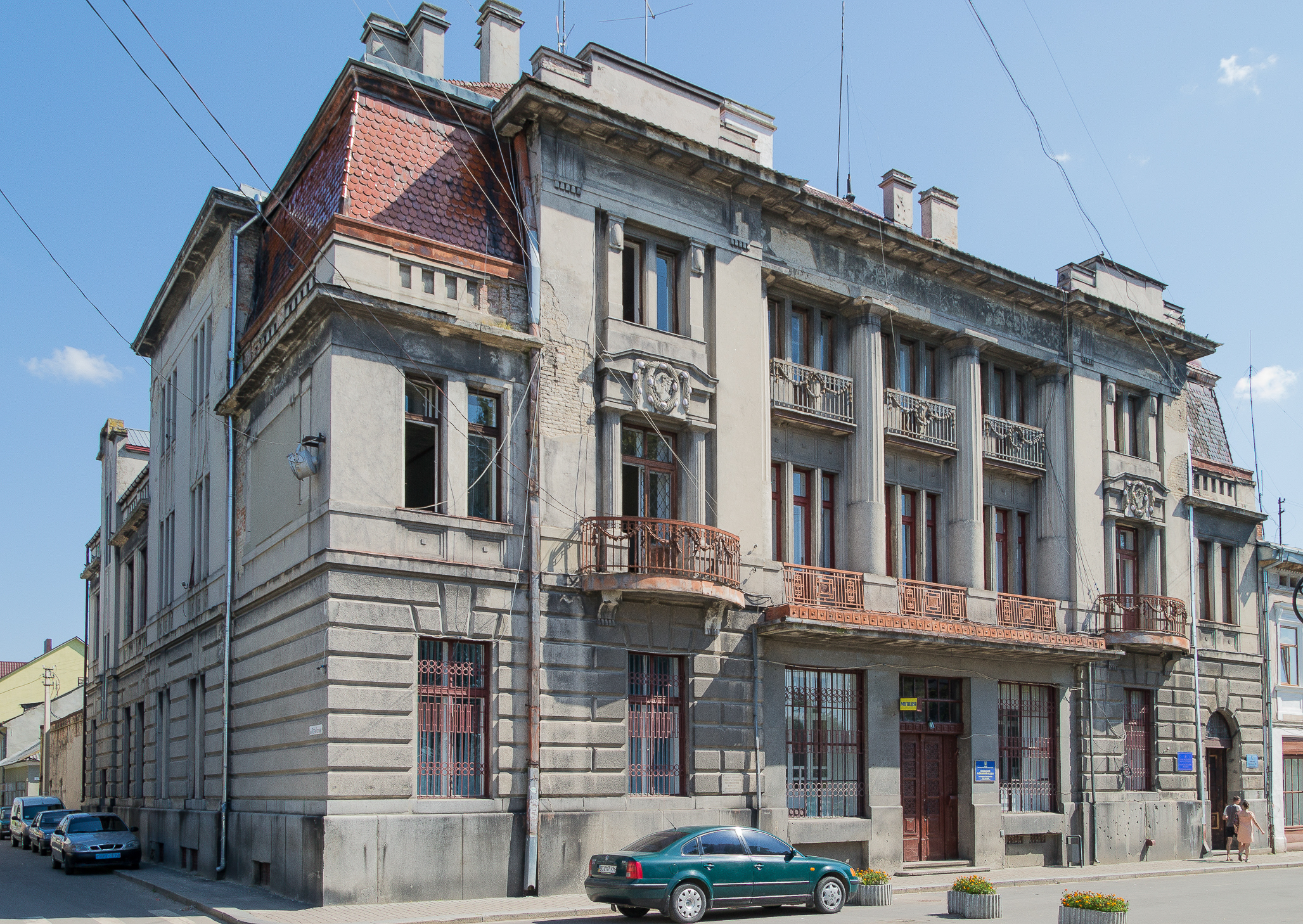
Administration building, former branch of the Prague Credit Bank before WWI

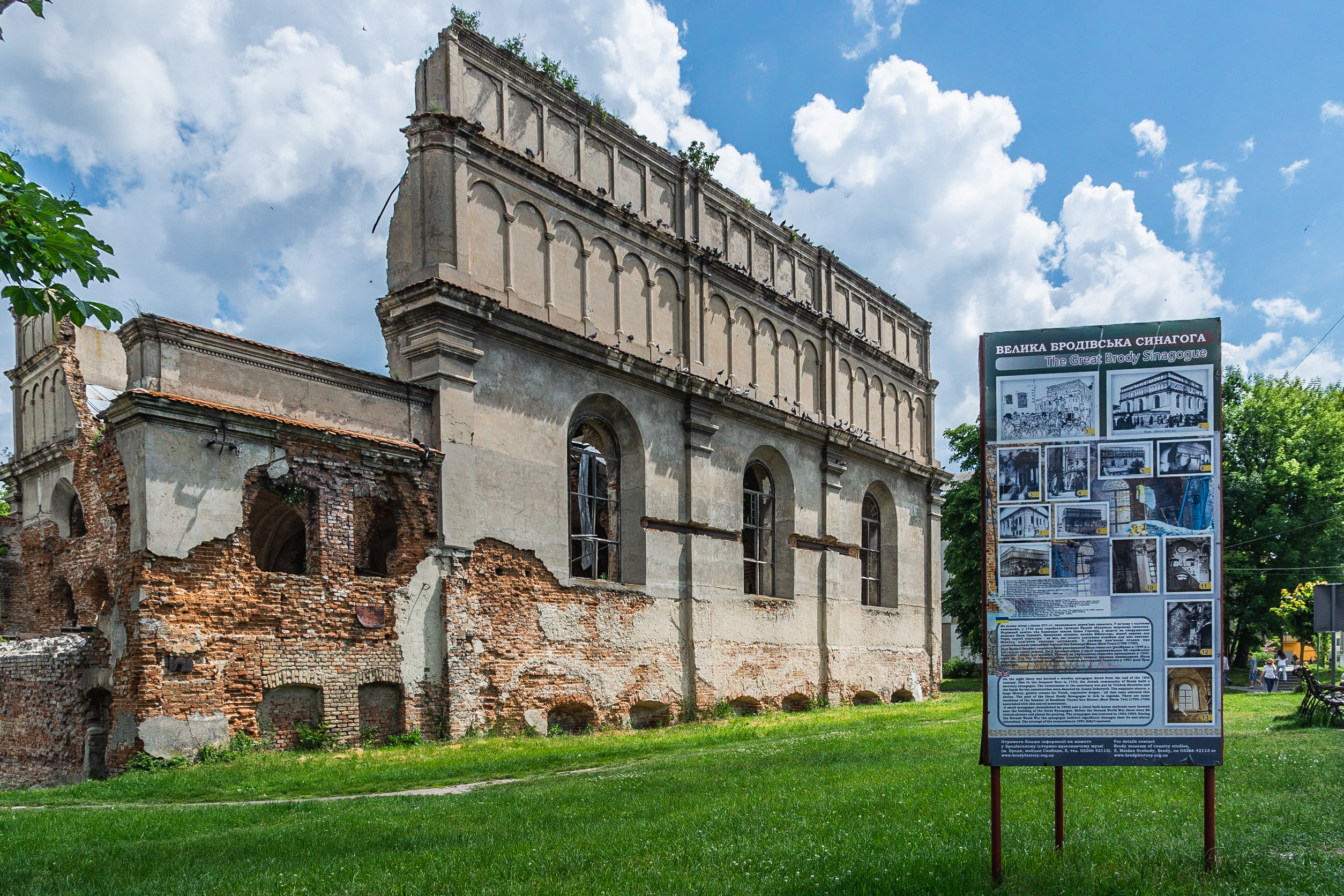
The old synagogue (ruins) of Brody

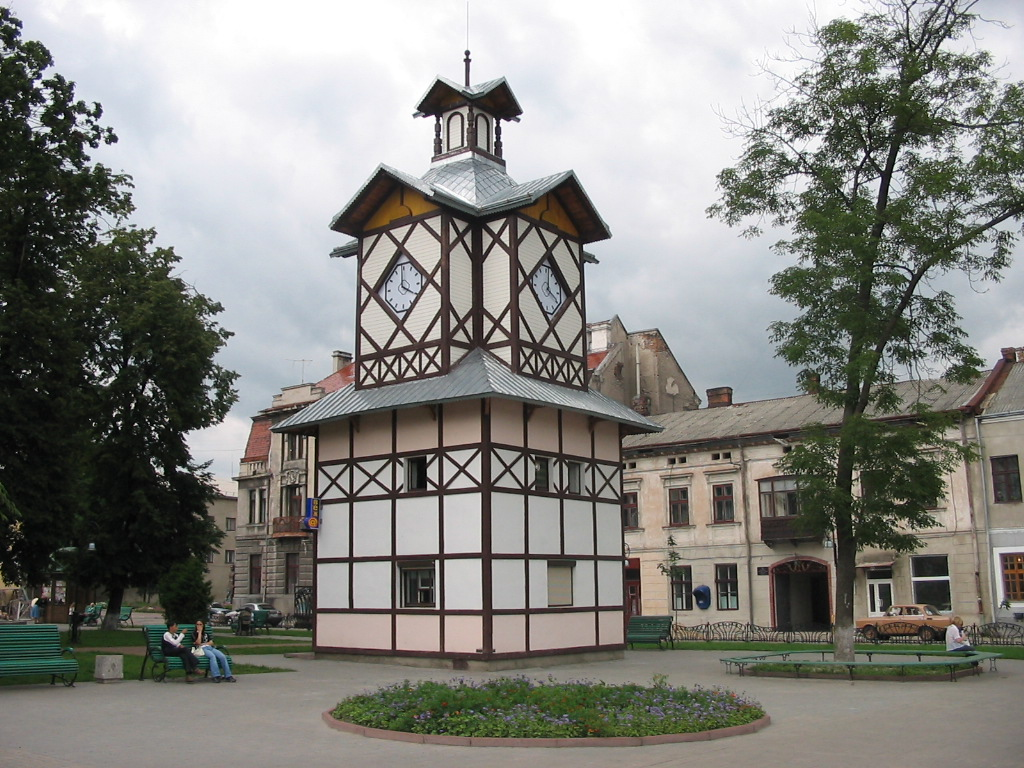
Clock tower at the market square

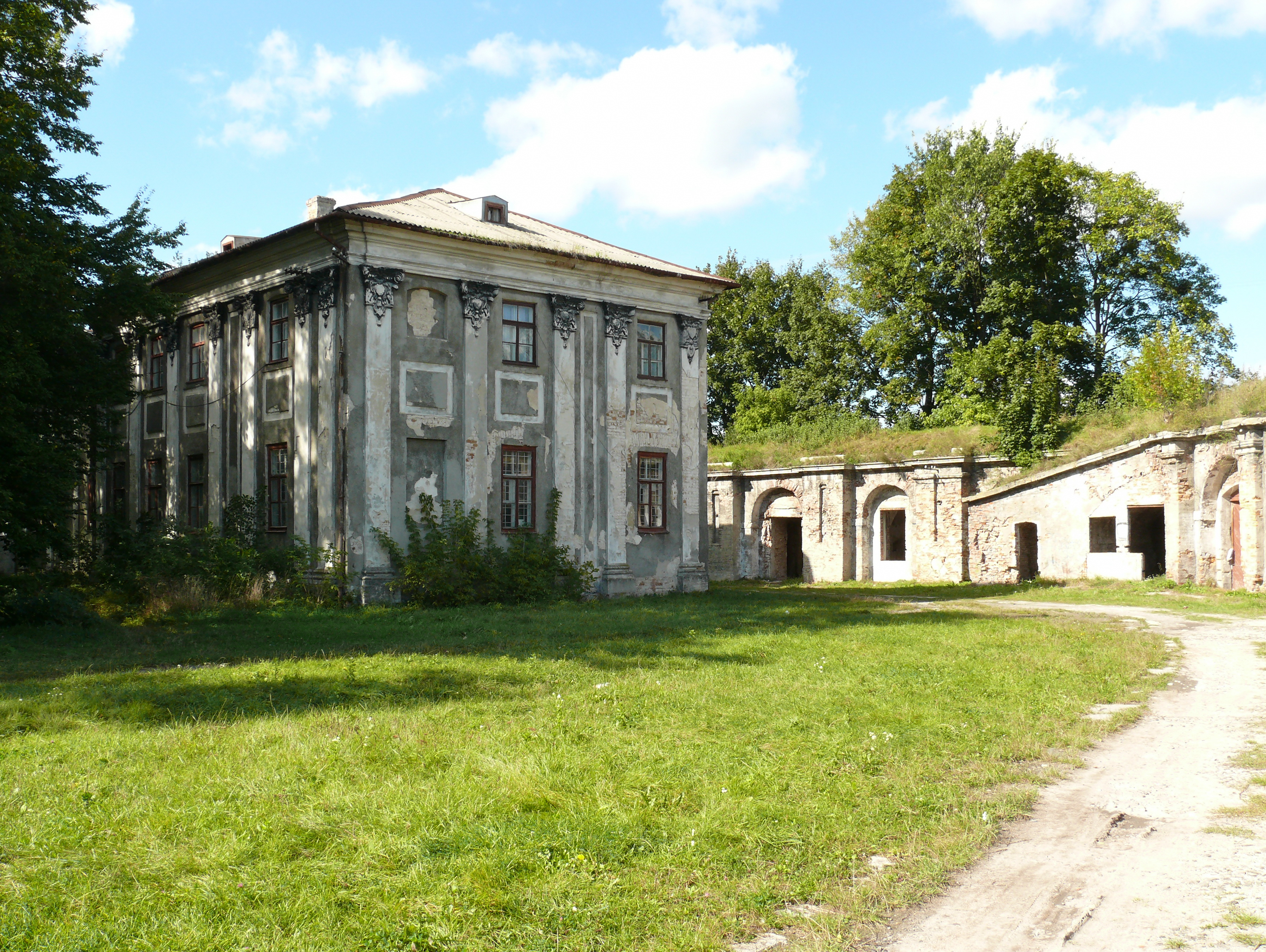
Brody Castle

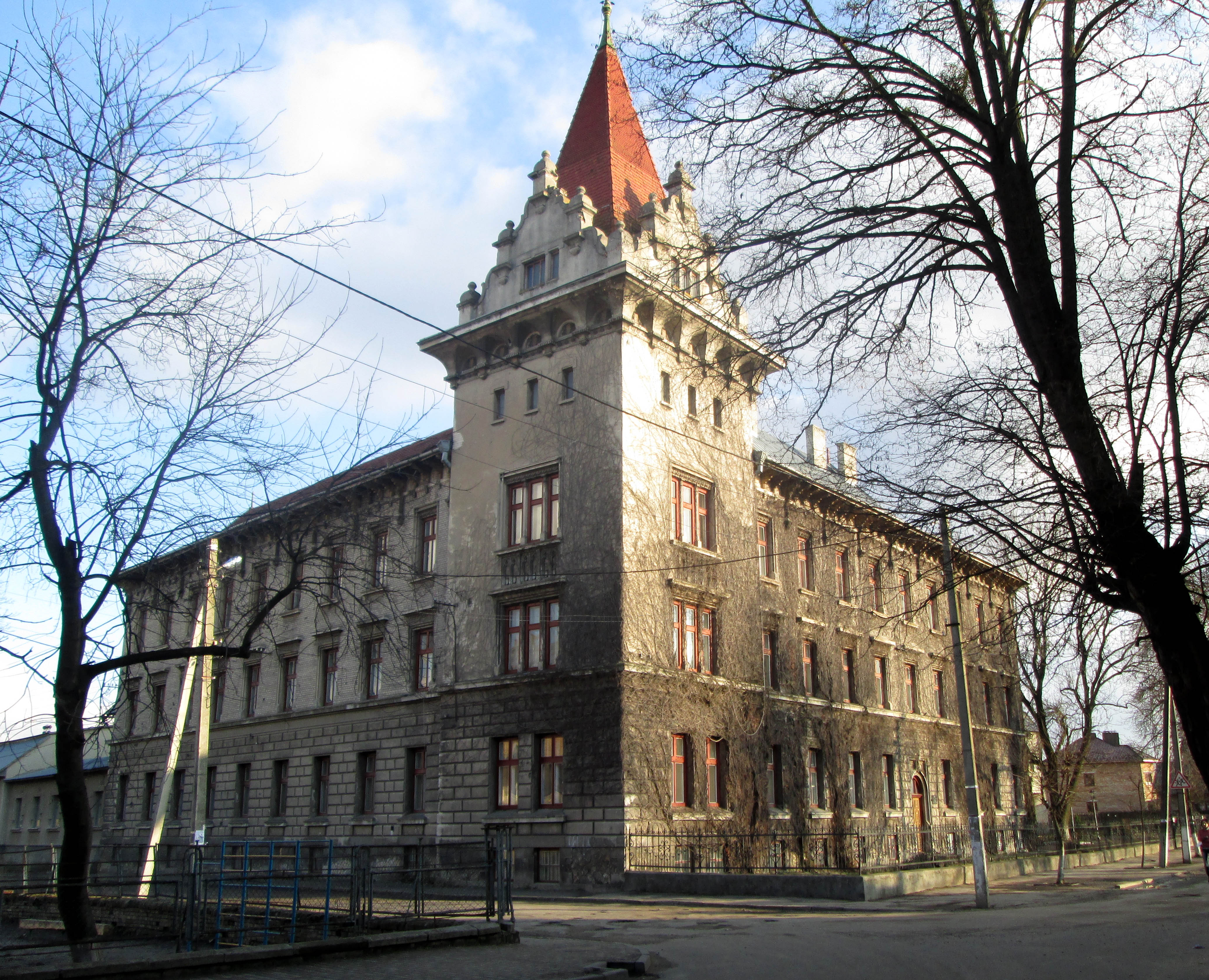
Pedagogical College

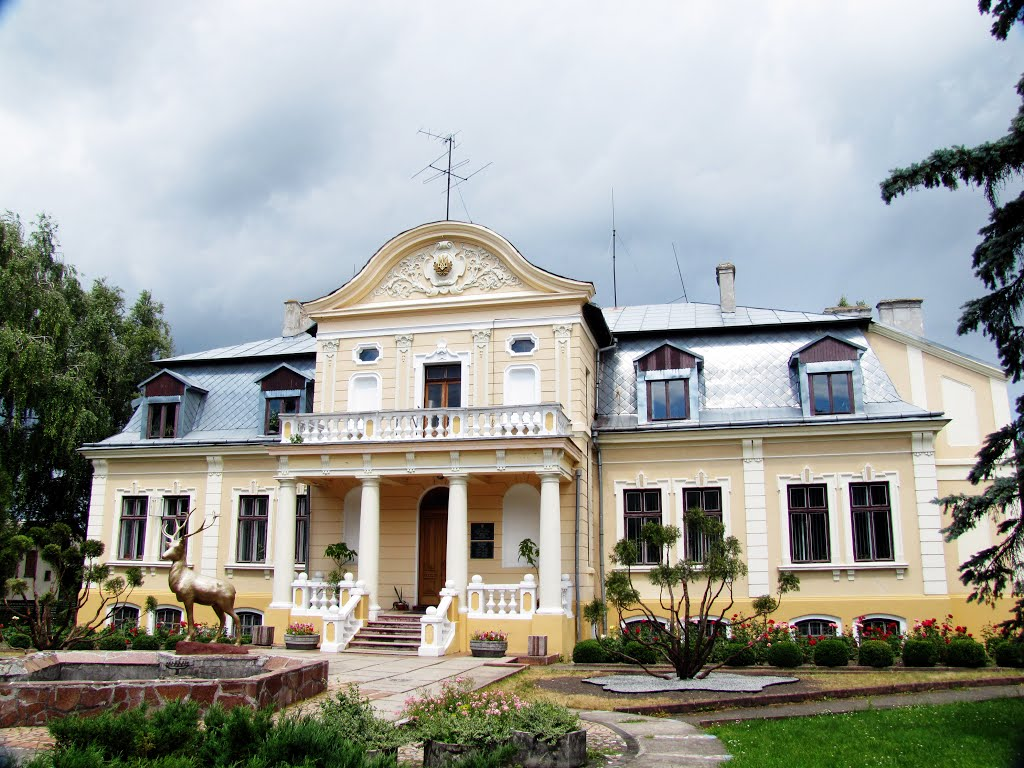
Tyszkiewicz Palace

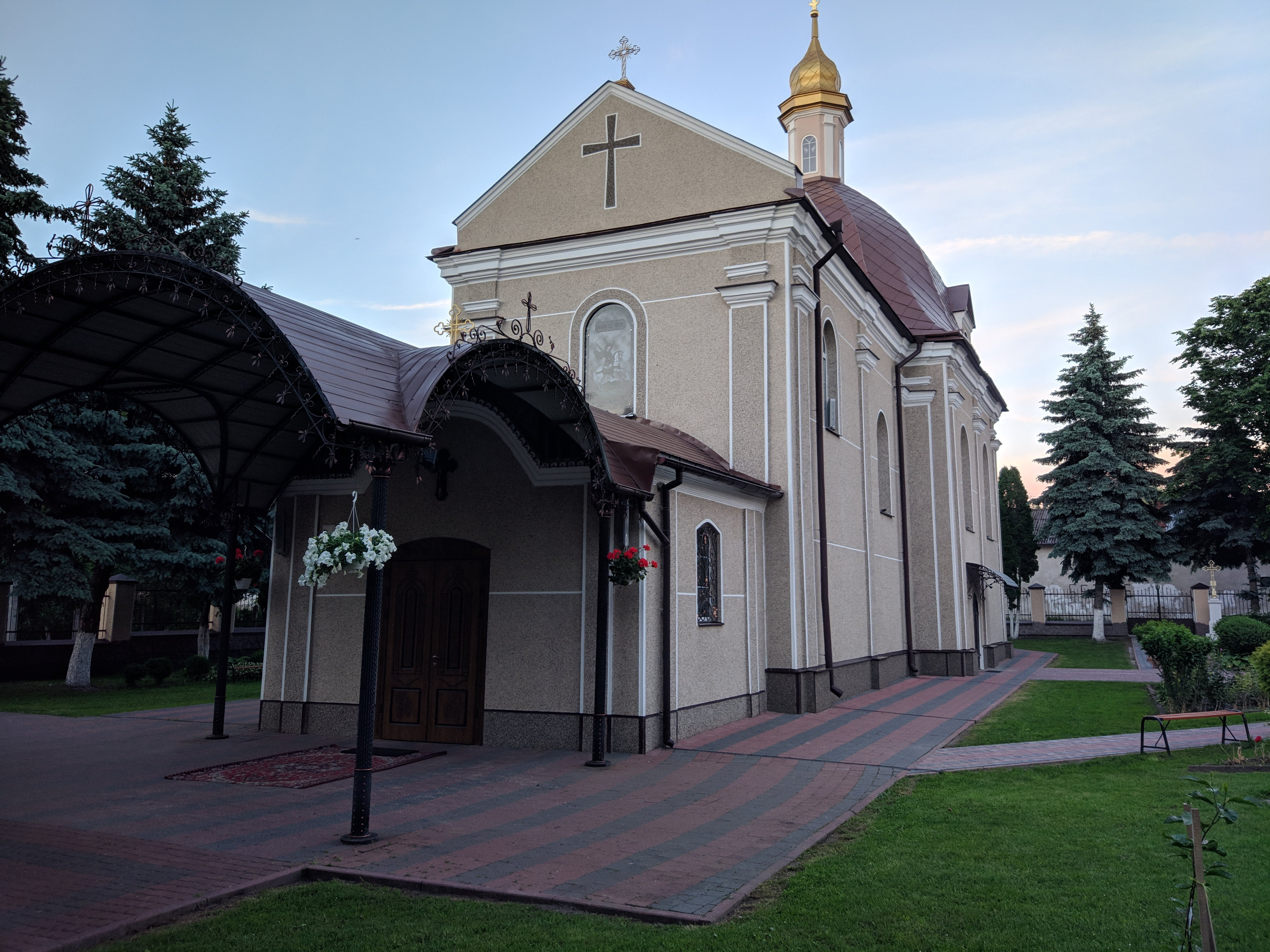
Saint George church in Brody

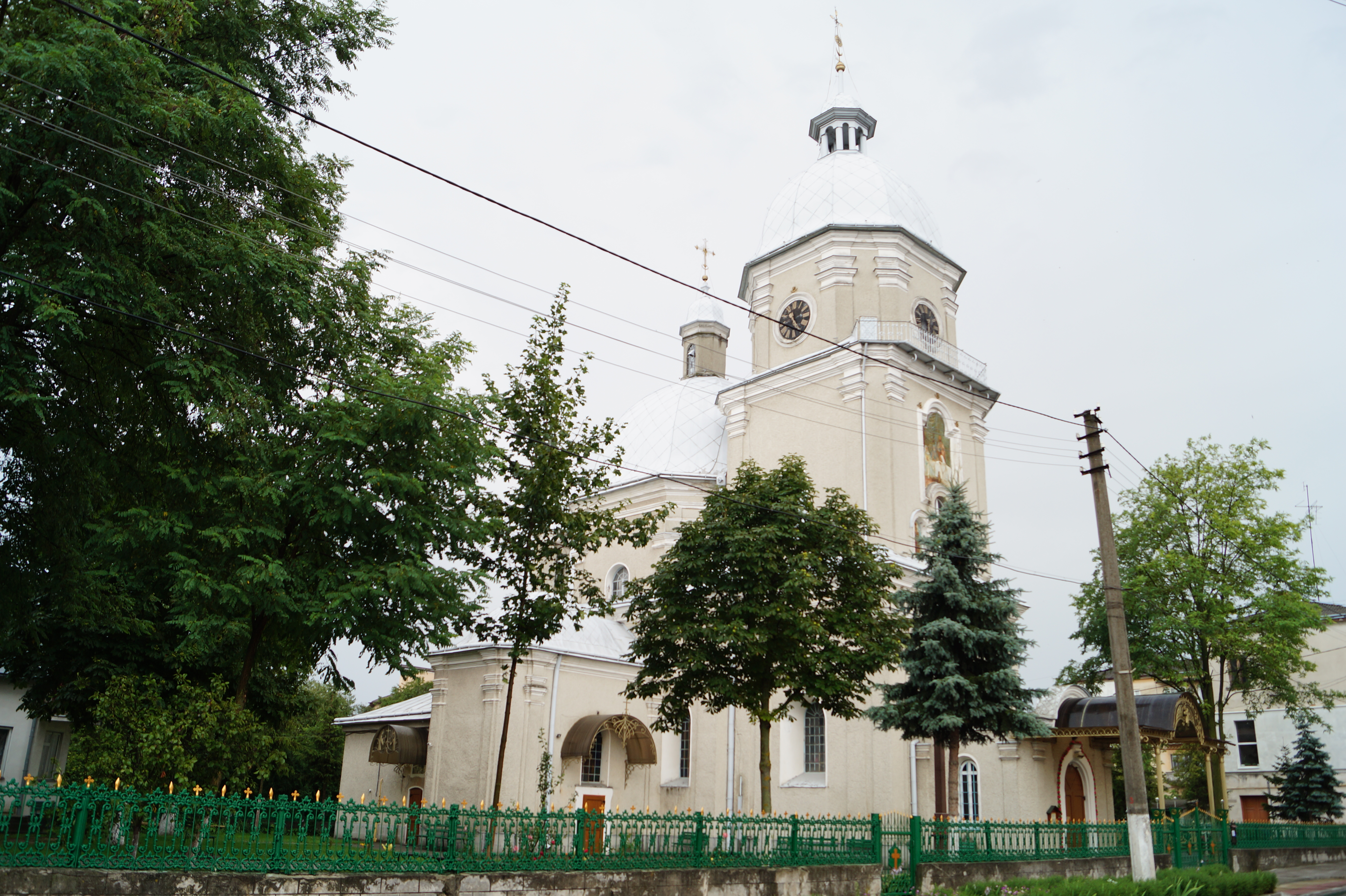
Church of the Nativity of the Virgin Mary

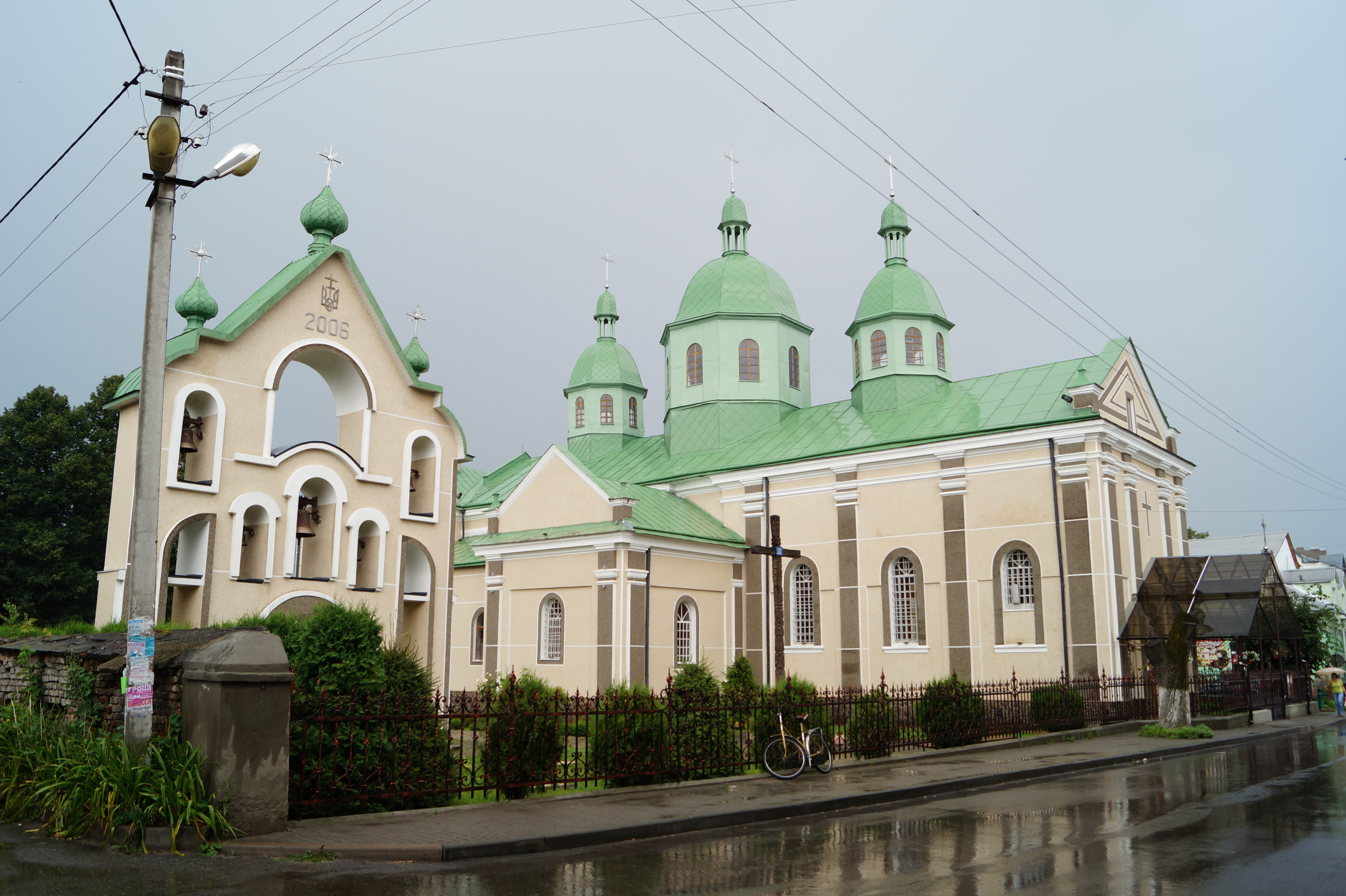
Exaltation of the Holy Cross church

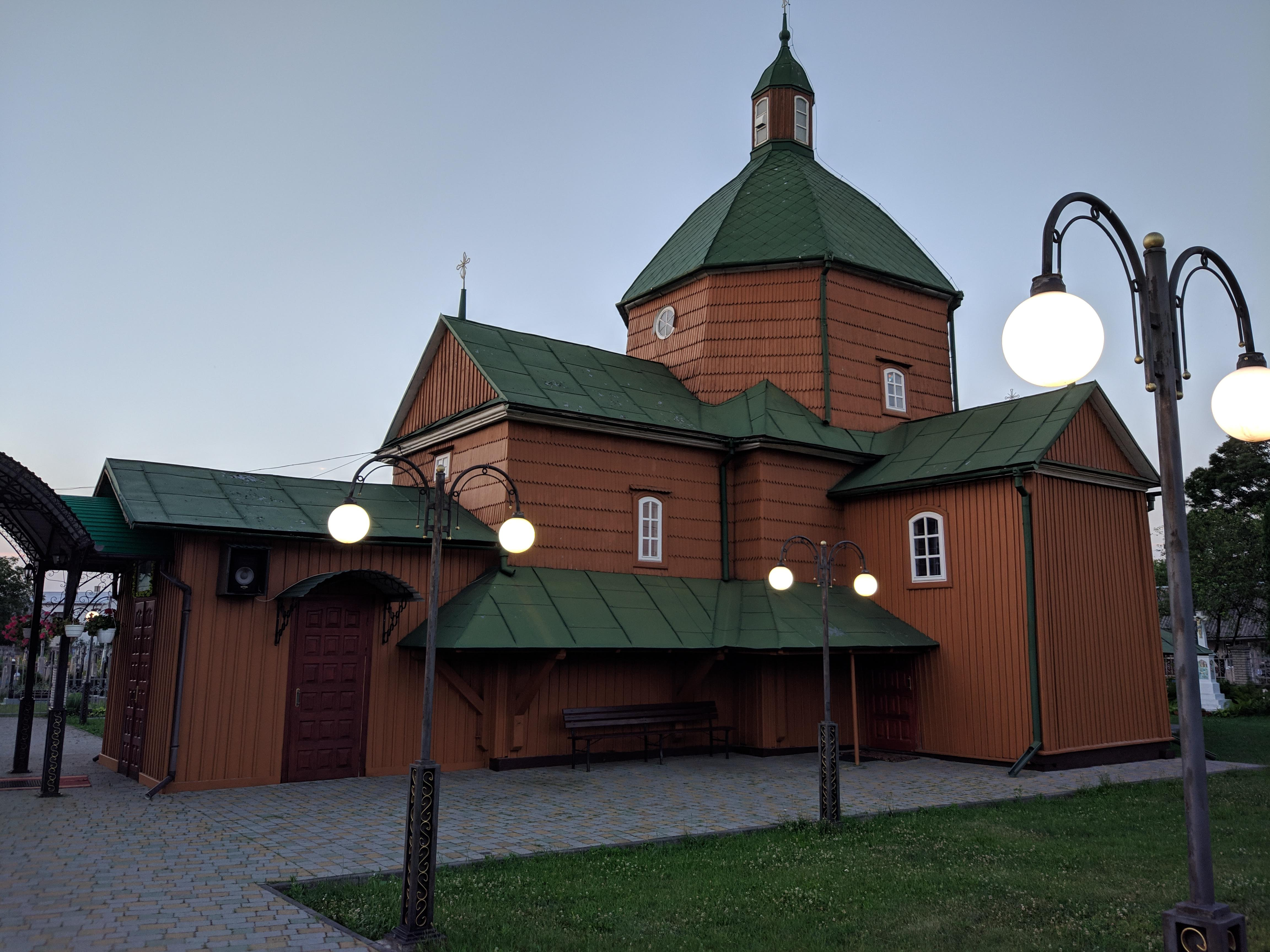
Church of the Holy Trinity

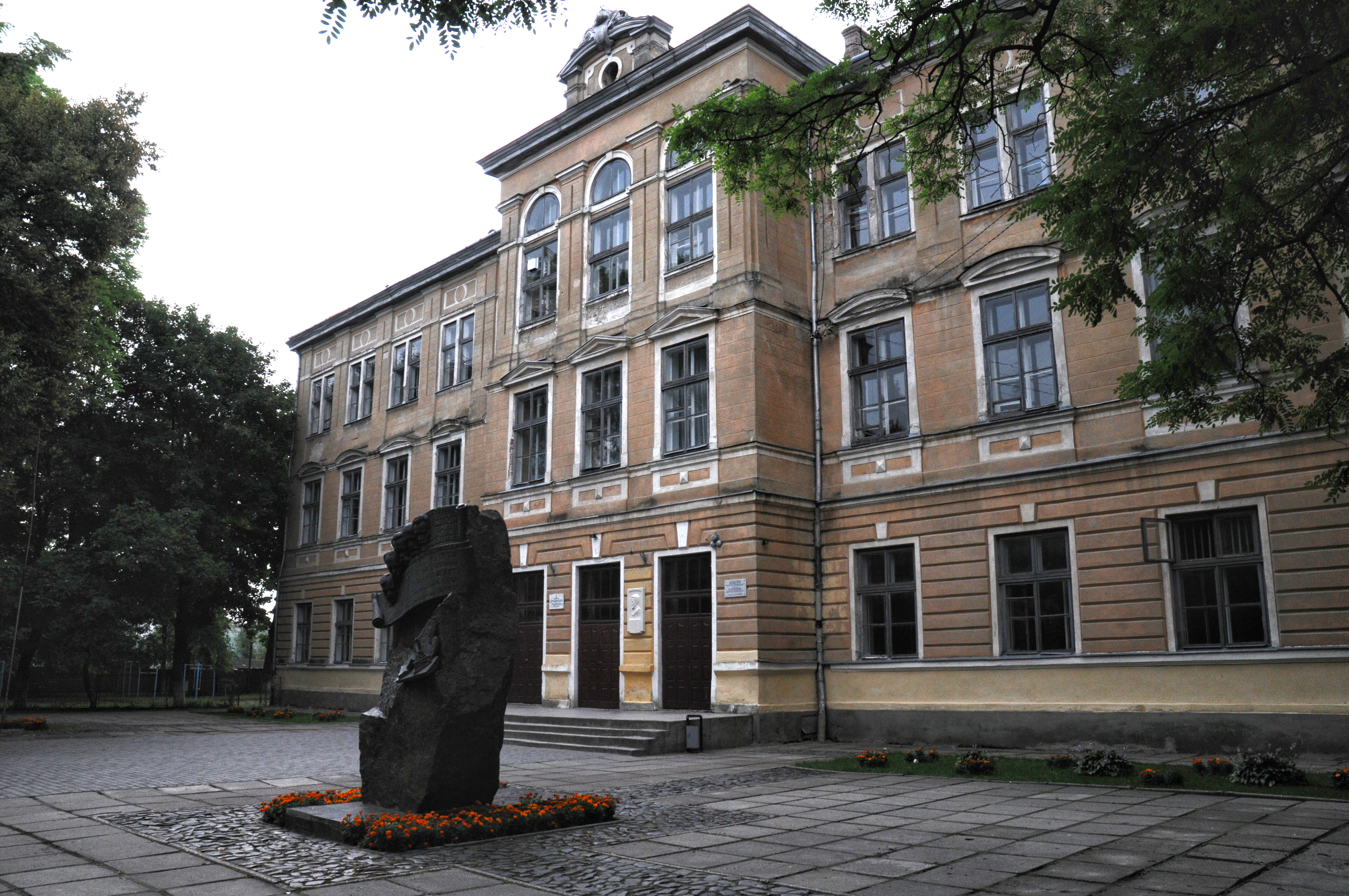
Brody Gymnasium

== Notable people ==
- Adolph Baller, Austrian-American pianist
- Iuliu Barasch, physician
- Ephraim Zalman Margolioth (author of Mateh Ephraim) (1762–1828)
- Aryeh Leib Bernstein (1708–1788), Chief Rabbi of Galicia
- Berl Broder (born Berl Margulis), singer
- Oscar Chajes, American chess player
- Zvi Hirsch Chajes, rabbi and talmudist
- Petro Fedun (1919–1951), revolutionary
- Nathan Michael Gelber (1891–1966), Austrian-Israeli historian
- Kalman Kahana (1910–1991), Israeli journalist, politician, and a signatory of the Israeli declaration of independence
- Leo Kanner (born Chaskel Leib Kanner), Austrian-American psychiatrist and physician known for his work related to autism
- Hans Kelsen (father's birthplace)
- Shlomo Kluger, rabbi
- Stanisław Koniecpolski, Polish military commander, magnate, and royal official
- Józef Korzeniowski (1797–1863), Polish writer
- Nachman Krochmal, Jewish philosopher
- Yechezkel Landau, rabbi
- Max Margules, meteorologist
- Fabius Mieses (1824–1898), writer
- Jacques Mieses, with parents from Brody; he was born in Leipzig
- Nachman of Horodenka, Hasidic leader
- Amalia Nathansohn-Freud (1835–1930), mother of Sigmund Freud
- Dmytro Pyluk (1900–1985), Ukrainian painter and film producer
- Joseph Ludwig Raabe, Swiss mathematician
- Elazar Rokeach, rabbi
- Jakob Rosanes, German mathematician
- Joseph Roth (1894–1939), writer
- Dov Sadan (1902–1989), scholar of Yiddish literature, Hebrew Literature and Jewish Folklore
- Myron Tarnavsky (1869–1938), general of the Ukrainian Galician Army
- Ivan Trush (1869–1941), Ukrainian artist
- Feliks West (1846–1946), Polish publisher
- Daniel Abraham Yanofsky, Canadian chess player. See German-language article.
- Israel Zolli, former Chief Rabbi of Rome who converted to Catholicism
- Oksana Lyniv, Ukrainian conductor, since February 2017 chief conductor of the Graz Opera

== Nearby towns ==
- Zolochiv
- Oles'ko
- Pidhirtsi (Szwaby, Schwabendorf), German settlement
- Busk
- Pidkamin
- Zboriv
- Berezhany
