= Brodie =

- Clan Brodie Crest Badge
- Language: Pictish or Gaelic

Origin
- Meaning: Unknown meaning, various theories
- Region of origin: Brodie, Moray, Scotland {Map}

Other names
- Variant forms: Brodi, Brody, Broddy, Broadie, Broady, Brodye, Broddie, Bradie, Brady, Breaddie, Brothie, Brothy, Breadie, Briddie, Bridie, Bridye, Brodey, Bridy, Bryde, Brydie, Bodie, MacBrody

Brodie can be a given name or a surname of Scottish origin, and a location in Moray, Scotland, its meaning is uncertain; it is not clear if Brodie, as a word, has its origins in the Gaelic or Pictish languages. In 2012 this name became the 53rd most popular boys' name in Scotland. The given name originates from the surname.

== Origin ==
The lands of Brodie are in Scotland, between Morayshire and Nairnshire, on the modern border that separates the Scottish Highlands and Moray. In the time of the Picts (pre 10th century), this location was at the heart of the Kingdom of Moravia. Early references show that the Brodie lands to be governed by a Tòiseach; in Scottish Gaelic, Tòiseach translates as "chieftain" or "clan chief", later to become Thane. Part of the Brodie lands were originally Temple Lands, owned by the order of the Knights Templar. It is uncertain if the Brodies took their name from the lands of Brodie or if the lands were named after the clan.

=== Meaning ===
Early references to Brodie were written as Brochy, Brothy, Brothie, Brothu, Brode. Various meanings to the name Brodie have been advanced, but given the Brodies uncertain origin, and the varying ways Brodie has been pronounced/written, these remain but suppositions. Some of the suggestions that have been advanced as to the meaning of the name Brodie are:

- Gaelic for "a little ridge"; "a brow", or "a precipice";
- "ditch" or "mire", from the old Irish word broth;
- Second son.
- "muddy place", from the Gaelic word brothach;
- "a point", "a spot", or "level piece of land", from the Gaelic word Brodha;
- or originated from the Pict name Brude, Bruide or Bridei from the Pictish King name Bridei.

== Surname ==
- Alexander Oswald Brodie (1849–1918), Governor of Arizona Territory
- Allan G. Brodie (1897–1976), American orthodontics educator
- Angela Hartley Brodie (1934–2017), British pharmacologist and cancer researcher
- Sir Benjamin Collins Brodie, 1st Baronet (1783–1862), English physiologist and surgeon
- Sir Benjamin Collins Brodie, 2nd Baronet (1817–1880), English chemist
- Bernard Beryl Brodie (1907–1989), American biochemist
- Bernard Brodie (military strategist) (1910–1978), American military strategist
- Chic Brodie (footballer) (1937–2000), Scottish footballer
- Dallas Brodie, Canadian politician
- Dan Brodie, singer/songwriter from Melbourne, Australia
- David Brodie (disambiguation), several people
- Don Brodie (1904–2001), American actor and director
- Douglas Neil Brodie, businessman and political figure in Nova Scotia
- Elizabeth Brodie (1794–1864), birth name of the Duchess of Gordon
- Eric Brodie (born 1940), Scottish footballer
- Fawn M. Brodie (1915–1981), American biographer and professor of history at UCLA
- H. Keith H. Brodie (1939–2016), American psychiatrist, president emeritus of Duke University
- Harold J. Brodie (1907–1989), Canadian mycologist
- Howard Brodie (1915–2010), American sketch artist known for his World War II combat sketches
- Ian Brodie (born 1967), Canadian political scientist
- Ian Brodie (journalist) (1936–2008), British journalist
- Imogen Harding Brodie (1878–1956), American vocal teacher and contralto soloist
- Sir Israel Brodie (1895–1979), Chief Rabbi of Great Britain and the Commonwealth 1948–1965
- James Brodie (disambiguation), several people
- Jean P. Brodie, British astrophysicist
- Joe Brodie, drummer in Drowners
- John Brodie (1935–2026), American football quarterback
- John Brodie (footballer, born 1862), English footballer
- John Brodie (footballer, born 1947), English footballer
- John Alexander Brodie (1858–1934), British civil engineer
- John H. Brodie (1969–2006), American theoretical physicist, expert in string theory
- John Leopold Brodie, designer of the Brodie helmet in 1915
- John Brodie Innes (1815–1894), vicar of Downe and friend of Charles Darwin
- John William Brodie-Innes, leading member of the Hermetic Order of the Golden Dawn's Amen-Ra Temple
- Joshua Brodie (born 1987), New Zealand cricketer
- Leanna Brodie, Canadian actor and playwright
- Leith Brodie, Australian sprint freestyle and medley swimmer
- Malcolm Brodie (journalist), Scottish-born journalist from Northern Ireland
- Malcolm Brodie (politician), the mayor of Richmond, British Columbia since 2001
- Michael Brodie (born 1974), British boxer
- Michael Brodie (rugby league), Ireland international rugby league footballer
- Mike Brodie (born 1985), American photographer
- Paul Brodie (1934–2007), Canadian saxophonist
- Paul Brodie, Canadian bicycle manufacturer (Brodie Bicycles), Mountain Bike Hall of Fame inductee
- Peter Bellinger Brodie (1815–1897), British geologist and churchman
- Philip Hope Brodie (born 1950), Scottish judge
- Regis Brodie, American Professor of Art at Skidmore College in Saratoga Springs, NY
- Richard Brodie (cricketer), Scottish-born Australian cricketer
- Richard Brodie (footballer), English footballer
- Richard Brodie (programmer), American author of Microsoft Word and professional poker player
- Sara Brodie, New Zealand theatre director and choreographer
- Starla Brodie, American World Series of Poker champion
- Steve Brodie (disambiguation), several people
- T. J. Brodie, Canadian hockey player
- Thomas L. Brodie, Irish theologian
- Thomas Brodie-Sangster, English actor
- Veronica Brodie, sister of Leila Rankine, Aboriginal Australian advocate for Warriappendi School in Adelaide
- Walter Brodie, New Zealand politician
- Walter Lorrain Brodie, Scottish recipient of Victoria Cross
- William Brodie (1741–1788), known as Deacon Brodie, Scottish cabinet-maker and deacon of a trades guild
- William Brodie (sculptor) (1815–1881), Scottish sculptor

=== Fictional characters ===
- Axel Brodie, in the Yu-Gi-Oh! GX anime series
- Ewan Brodie, in the series Monarch of the Glen
- Jean Brodie, in the novel The Prime of Miss Jean Brodie and film adaptation
- J. H. Brodie, in the television series Homicide: Life on the Street
- Jackson Brodie, in the detective series written by Kate Atkinson
- Melanie Brodie, in the series Degrassi Junior High
- Brodie family, from the BBC One Scotland soap opera River City

== Given name ==
Brodie
- Gender: Male

Origin
- Origin: Pictish or Gaelic
- Meaning: Unknown meaning, various theories.
- Region of origin: Brodie, Moray, Scotland. {Map}

- Brodie Atkinson, Australian rules footballer
- Brodie Brazil, American television broadcaster
- Brodie Croyle, American football quarterback for the Kansas City Chiefs
- Brodie Dupont, Canadian ice hockey forward
- Brodie Farber, American mixed martial arts fighter
- Brodie Greer, American actor
- Brodie Henderson (rugby union), Canadian international rugby union player
- Brodie Henderson (engineer), British railway engineer
- Brodie Holland, Australian rules footballer in the Australian Football League
- Brodie Lee, American professional wrestler
- Brodie MacDonald, Canadian lacrosse player
- Brodie McGhie Willcox, British co-founder of the Peninsular & Oriental Steam Navigation Company
- Brodie Moles, Australian rules football player
- Brodie Mooy, Australian football (soccer) player
- Brodie Neill, Australian industrial designer
- Brodie Retallick (born 1991), New Zealand rugby union player
- Brodie West, Canadian musician
- Brodie Westen (1932–2021), American coach for the Western Illinois University Leathernecks

=== Fictional characters ===
- Brodie Bruce, played by Jason Lee in the film Mallrats
- Brodie Hanson, in the Australian soap opera Home and Away

== Coats of arms ==
Brodie coats of arms include:

Brodie of Brodie

Brodie of Spynie

Brodie of Lethen

Brodie of Mylton

Brodie of Idvies

Brodie of Mayne

Brodie of Rosthorn

Callender-Brodie

Captain David Brodie

Brodie of Boxford

Brodie-Wood of Keithick

Brodie-Innes of Milton Brodie

== See also ==
- Brody (name), given name and surname
- Russell Westbrook, basketball player nicknamed Brodie
