= James Brodie =

James or Jim Brodie may refer to:

- James Brodie (Australian cricketer) (1820–1912), Australian cricketer
- James Brodie (Scottish cricketer) (1893–1939), Scottish cricketer and British Army officer
- James Brodie (South African cricketer) (born 1937), South African cricketer
- James Brodie (botanist) (1744–1824), Scottish botanist and politician
- James Brodie (Canadian politician), 20th-century Canadian politician
- James Brodie (politician, born 1637) (1637–1708), Scottish politician, member of Scottish Parliament for Elgin & Forfarshire
- James Brodie (politician, born 1695) (1695–1720), Scottish politician, member of British Parliament for Elginshire
- Jim Brodie (geologist) (James William Brodie, 1920–2009), New Zealand geologist
- Jim Brodie (politician), member of the Florida House of Representatives

== See also ==
- James Brody (1941–2010), American composer
- Lieutenant James Brody, fictional character from seaQuest DSV
- Thenral, built by businessman and civil servant James Brodie (1769–1801)
