= Alexander Brodie =

Alexander Brodie may refer to:

- Sir Alexander Brodie, Lord Brodie (1617–1680) of Brodie, member of the Parliament of Scotland for Elginshire 1643–50
- Alexander Brodie (died 1672) of Lethen, member of the Parliament of Scotland for Nairnshire 1646–9
- Alexander Brodie (1697–1754) of Brodie, Lord Lyon King of Arms and a Member of the Parliament of Great Britain 1720–54 for Elginshire, Caithness and Inverness
- Alexander Brodie (died 1770) of Lethen, member of parliament for Nairnshire 1735–41
- Alexander Brodie (1748–1812), member of parliament for Nairnshire 1785–90 and Elgin Burghs 1790–1802
- Alexander Brodie (sculptor) (1829/30–1867), Scottish sculptor, younger brother of William Brodie
- Alexander Oswald Brodie (1849–1918), US soldier and Governor of Arizona Territory 1902–5
- John Alexander Brodie (1858–1934), civil engineer and town planner
- Several members of Clan Brodie

== See also ==
- Alexander Broadie (born 1942), Scottish historian of philosophy
- Alexander Brody (disambiguation)
