= Richard Brodie =

Richard Brodie may refer to:

- Richard Brodie (cricketer) (1813–1872), Australian cricketer
- Richard Brodie (footballer) (born 1987), English footballer
- Richard Brodie (programmer) (born 1959), American programmer and author
