= Bruce Brodie =

Bruce Brodie may refer to:

- Bruce Brodie (cricketer) (1937–2024), South African cricketer
- Bruce Brodie (View Askewniverse), fictional character from the View Askewniverse fictional universe
- Bruce Brodie (Doctors), fictional character from the TV series Doctors
