= Ian Brodie (disambiguation) =

Ian Brodie (born 1967) is a Canadian political scientist.

Ian Brodie is also the name of:

- Ian Brodie (journalist) (1936–2008), British journalist and foreign correspondent

== See also ==
- Ian Broudie (born 1958), English musician and producer, best known for his 1990s band the Lightning Seeds
