= Broudy =

Broudy is a surname. Notable people with the surname include:

- Harry Broudy (1905–1998), Polish-born American educator
- Trev Broudy (born 1968), American actor and former model

== See also ==
- Brody (name)
