= Brody (name) =

Brody (/broʊdi/) is a given name and a surname of Scottish origin, which may also be spelled Brodie. It may mean "ditch, mire" in Scottish Gaelic. An unrelated name Bródy is found in Hungary and Poland.

Notable people with the name include:

== Surname ==
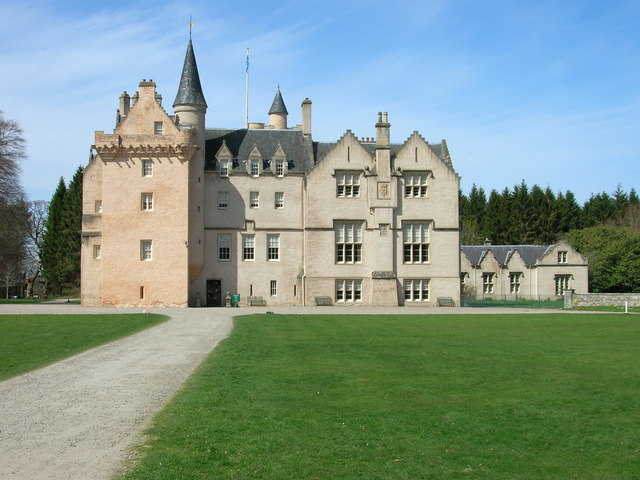
Brodie Castle (styled as Brody) in Scotland

=== Brody ===
- Adam Brody (born 1979), American actor
- Adrien Brody (born 1973), American actor
- Alan Brody, American writer
- Alexander Brody (disambiguation), several people
- Ann Brody (1884–1944), American actress
- David Brody (journalist) (born 1965), American television reporter and author
- David Brody (historian) (born 1930), American historian
- Dean Brody (born 1975), Canadian country music singer
- Dylan Brody (born 1964), American writer
- Elaine Brody (1922–2014), American gerontologist and sociologist
- Florian Brody (born 1953), Austrian-American digital media creator, inventor, writer, public speaker, academic, and global business consultant
- Frances Brody, English novelist and playwright also writing as Frances McNeil
- Francine Brody, British/American actress
- Gene Brody (born 1950), American psychologist
- Howard Brody (born 1949), American bioethicist
- Howard M. Brody (1932–2015), American physicist who specialised in tennis physics
- Jane Brody (born 1941), American journalist
- Joseph Brody (disambiguation), several people
- Lane Brody (born 1955), American singer-songwriter
- Leola Brody (1922–1997), All-American Girls Professional Baseball League player
- Leonard Brody (born 1971), Canadian writer
- Morton A. Brody (1933–2000), American judge
- Nathan Brody, American psychologist
- Neville Brody (born 1957), British graphic designer
- Reed Brody is a Hungarian Jewish-American human rights lawyer and prosecutor and author of several books including To Catch a Dictator: The Pursuit and Trial of Hissène Habré.
- Richard Brody (born 1958), American film critic
- Sam Brody (1907–1987), American film director
- Steven Brody (1919 or 1926–1994), American jewelry designer
- Tal Brody (born 1943), American-born Israeli basketball player
- William R. Brody (born 1944), American radiologist and university president

=== Bródy ===
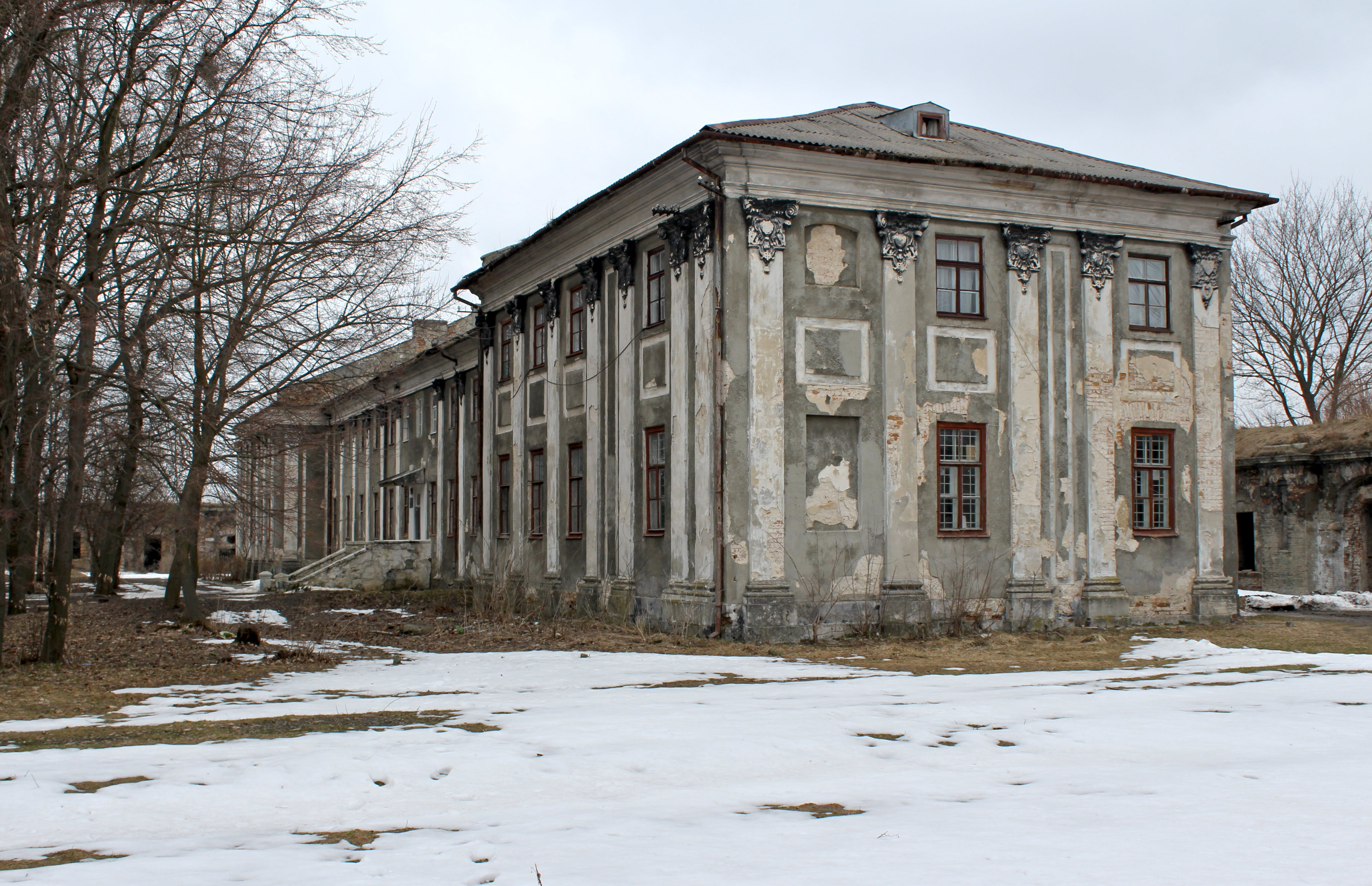
Brody Castle in Lviv Oblast, Ukraine

Bródy is a Hungarian surname. The "ó" is a long o [o:] in Hungarian, and the "y" indicates a "from": "from Bród". This surname is also associated with the Ukrainian city of Brody.

- Henrik Bródy (1868–1942), Hungarian rabbi and writer
- Imre Bródy (1891–1944), Hungarian physicist
- János Bródy (born 1946), Hungarian singer, lyricist and songwriter
- Michael Brody (born 1954), Hungarian linguist
- Sándor Bródy (footballer) (1884–1944), Hungarian footballer
- Sándor Bródy (writer) (1863–1924), Hungarian writer
- T. Peter Brody (1920–2011), British-naturalised Hungarian physicist
- Zsigmond Bródy (1840–1906), Hungarian journalist

== Given name ==
- Brody Bishop (born 1984), Canadian basketball player
- Brody Dalle (born 1979), Australian musician
- Brody Foley (born 2003), American football player
- Brody Hutzler (born 1971), American actor
- Brody Jenner (born 1983), American actor and television personality
- Brody Malone (born 2000), American artistic gymnast
- Brody Stevens (born Steven Brody, 1970–2019), American comedian and actor

== Fictional characters ==
- Jessica Brody, in the television series Homeland
- Brody Davis, in the television series Roswell
- James Brody, in the television series SeaQuest DSV
- Jason Brody, protagonist of the 2012 video game Far Cry 3
- Joe Brody, in the novel The Big Sleep and in its adaptation in the films made in 1946 and 1978
- Marcus Brody, in the Indiana Jones films
- Martin Brody, in the films Jaws and Jaws 2, played by Roy Scheider
- Matt Brody, in the television series Baywatch
- Nicholas Brody, in the television series Homeland
- Brody Romero, in the television series Power Rangers Ninja Steel
- Brody, in the animated television series The Ridonculous Race
- Brody, a fictional character from the animated series Rock Paper Scissors
- Brody, playable character in the mobile game Mobile Legends: Bang Bang

== See also ==
- Brodie
- Broderick
- Brodsky
- Brady (surname)
- Brady (given name)
