= List of Cabin Pressure characters =

This is a list of characters who appear in the BBC Radio 4 sitcom Cabin Pressure.

== Characters ==
=== Main characters ===
The principal cast — the 4-person crew — across all 27 episodes (with one exception (Note: In the series 3 episode, "Newcastle", Tom Goodman-Hill stood in for Cumberbatch, who had lost his voice. At the same recording session, Goodman-Hill also recorded "Ottery St Mary" but his scenes were not used as Cumberbatch was able to record them in a subsequent performance at the Shaw Theatre on 29 April 2011.)) is the following:

- Carolyn Knapp-Shappey (Stephanie Cole), later known as Carolyn Shipwright, who received as part of her divorce settlement, a 16-seat "Lockheed McDonnell 3-12" business jet aeroplane nicknamed "Gerti", derived from the registration: G-ERTI — Golf Echo Romeo Tango India. As a result, and because it is "better than [being] a little old lady", she founded her very own one-plane charter airline, "MJN Air" ("My Jet Now"), crewed by an oddball mixture of characters who fly to cities around the world, encountering a variety of situations. Her company is perpetually on the brink of bankruptcy, and thus she strives to reduce running costs wherever possible and to find more high-value clients to keep the company going. As a former stewardess herself, she often pulls double duty as both administrator and cabin attendant, alongside her grown-up but childish son Arthur, whom she struggles to educate in proper customer care. She is a devotee to the quotations of Dorothy Parker, regularly citing them in the dialogue. In "Helsinki", when Arthur organised a surprise excursion for Carolyn's 63rd birthday and invited her estranged sister Ruth, it is revealed that she was originally called Carol, originated from Lancashire and pursued a career in air travel because she did not want to run the family sweet shop.
- Captain Martin Crieff (Benedict Cumberbatch (Note: In the series 3 episode, "Newcastle", Tom Goodman-Hill stood in for Cumberbatch, who had lost his voice. At the same recording session, Goodman-Hill also recorded "Ottery St Mary" but his scenes were not used as Cumberbatch was able to record them in a subsequent performance at the Shaw Theatre on 29 April 2011.)) has wanted to be a pilot since he was six years old (before which he wanted to be an aeroplane). However, he suffers from a distinct lack of natural ability in that department along with a lack of charisma, low self-opinion and short stature resulting in him being frequently passed over, making him over-compensate as a result by wearing a enough gold braid on his captain's uniform to make a South American junta-leading tin-pot generalissimo look drably dressed. He has been rejected by at least one flight school, and had to put himself through the required coursework, barely qualifying for his certification — on his seventh attempt. As MJN Air's only captain, he took the job with the airline after being interviewed for a salaried first officer's position, instead he chose to be captain for no salary at all. He appears to have no outside interests beyond flying. He is a stickler for procedures and regulations, but is more prissy than pompous. At the end of series two he tells Douglas that he survives financially by running a "man-with-a-van" delivery service — Icarus Removals — using the van he inherited from his father (running two different jobs largely explaining the lack of hobbies). This was his only inheritance (apart from a tool kit and multimeter), because his father believed he would waste any money he received trying to become a pilot (but also that he would take better care of it than his brother). He has two siblings still resident in his home town of Wokingham: Caitlin, a traffic warden, and Simon, a senior administrator for the local council, who often frustrates Martin with his annoying superiority; this is not helped by his mother's constant admiration of the elder and much taller brother, often saying that "Simon knows best". According to Carolyn, he is the "safe pilot", in contrast to Douglas's "good pilot", with the bonus that the former is in charge of the latter.
- First Officer Douglas Richardson (Roger Allam), on the other hand, is a very capable pilot who worked as an airline captain for Air England — until he was fired for smuggling silk kimonos from Hong Kong. Unable to get work elsewhere because of this, he chafes at his subordinate position to Martin in a tin-pot airline company, and so misses no opportunity to flaunt his superiority in the younger and less able pilot's face. Douglas is quick-witted and forever scheming — a running joke being his cunning thefts of the prized 25-year-old Talisker single malt whisky intended for Mr Birling — something of a smooth operator who knows all of the dodges available to airline officers, and enjoys taking part in all of them to greatly supplement his meagre income from MJN or to avoid exerting effort. He is also a recovering alcoholic, having been sober for a period of several years at the time the story begins, although he tries to prevent anyone else from knowing about it, fearing it will tarnish his image. He has a noted womanising habit and has been divorced three times, common amongst airline pilots of the late 20th century. In later episodes, it is revealed that Douglas, ashamed of his second-rate job, dresses in captain's uniform for his wife Helena's benefit, changing into first officer's uniform before he gets to work, however this ends when his wife reveals her infidelity and Douglas divorces her: his third divorce overall. He is mentioned as having a young daughter with one of his first two wives, with his job often keeping him from spending time with her; in an attempt to make a special gesture to her when he had to work during her birthday, Douglas attempted to use Gerti to shower sweets on the party (although this resulted in the death of a koi carp due to the sweets being unintentionally turned into a solid brick). In the end though, he has a grudging fondness of and sympathy for Martin and so tries to teach him many of his tricks, though many fall on deaf ears. However, according to Carolyn, he is the "good pilot", in contrast to Martin's "safe pilot".
- Carolyn's son Arthur Shappey (John Finnemore) is an overly eager and cheery dimwit aged 29, who is supposed to be the flight attendant, but usually manages to get in everyone's way. He is half-English and half-Australian: the product of his English mother and her now ex-husband, Gordon from Australia — the original owner of Gerti. Arthur is a relentless optimist, whose talents are abysmal for doing impressions, singing, and cooking — with his biggest claim to fame being the inventor (or at least discoverer) of fizzy yoghurt — the recipe for which is yoghurt plus time. He also celebrates "Birling day", "Birling day eve", Gerti's birthday, and "Summer Christmas", and is a definite polar bear enthusiast and expert. He is very allergic to strawberries and dragon fruit — however, he has eaten strawberry mousse before, claiming that he does not know there are strawberries in strawberry mousse, and did not know that he was allergic to dragon fruit until trying some. However, his exuberance and cheerful mannerisms are badly affected on the rare occasions that he sees his father, of whom he seems very cowed. Intellectually-speaking, Arthur is distinctively unintelligent, and has the particular habit of only describing anything that impresses him as 'brilliant!' Carolyn dearly loves her only child, but this is sorely strained by his relentless cheerfulness, and Arthur is also fiercely protective of his mother, as is shown in the episode "Helsinki", when he throws a bowl full of chocolate 'cake' (in reality chocolate pudding with powdered milk) all over Carolyn's older sister for berating her.

The airline crew frequently pass their time by engaging in "Flight-deck Buckeroo", playing word games such as naming the "Brians of Britain" (a pun on the classic BBC Radio 4 quiz show Brain of Britain), playing "Simon says", making bets that Douglas always wins, or playing a game of the travelling lemon — wherein a lemon must be hidden in plain sight among the passengers to be discovered by the next player. All crew members also make humorous cabin addresses, inserting e.g. limericks or titles of Hitchcock films, usually when there are no passengers aboard. The highlight of their flight is often the cheese tray, often employed in their betting, and of which they are angered to learn (in one of the later episodes) that before it is delivered to them Carolyn eats the Camembert off it.

=== Recurring characters ===
A frequent recurring character across all 4 series and the Zurich special is Karl (Ewen Macintosh, Simon Greenall, Roger Morlidge, Paul Shearer, Steve Brody, Dan Tetsell) the Air Traffic Controller at Fitton airfield. His informal use of language over the radio is often maligned by Martin.

A recurring character from the episode "Newcastle" in series 3 onward, Hercules Shipwright (Anthony Head). Herc, as he is known, is a pilot working as an airline captain for Air Caledonia and a long-time acquaintance and one-time colleague at Air England of Douglas, with whom he also shares his womanising habit and has been divorced four times. While previously on good terms, Douglas developed an animosity towards Herc due to Herc's deflection of Douglas's request to join Air Caledonia, which reached its peak when Herc stood in as captain for Martin during a job interview, during which Douglas was required to do the actual work. He often goes on dates with Carolyn, despite her claims otherwise, during which they tease each other. Sources of ridicule are her cockerpoo, named by Arthur "Snoop-a-doop", against his vegetarianism and his phobia of sheep, to the extent that Carolyn flies to Ireland to purchase a stuffed sheep for his birthday present. He is fond of opera, much to Carolyn's dismay. From a flying family, Herc was named "after the plane, not the hero" and mentioned having two brothers named Wellington and Harrier (although he said he also had a sister named Susan, their father being "eccentric, not mad"). In the show's final episode, “Zurich”, Hercules Shipwright finds a new job as the first officer at OJS ("Our Jet Still") − the renamed "MJN Air" − with Douglas Richardson as his captain, before they fly off into the sunset.

In the first, third, and fourth series, the crew take Mr Birling (Geoffrey Whitehead), a very rich Welshman (although Martin assumed that he was English when he first met him), to the final match of the Six Nations Rugby Championship starting with the "Edinburgh" episode. Birling is extremely unpleasant and condescending to everyone including his hectoring wife, but the crew put up with him due to his propensity for giving exceptionally large tips. The annual "Birling Day" is always accompanied by Douglas trying to steal the expensive 25-year-old Talisker single malt whisky intended for Mr Birling. In "Timbuktu", when Birling Day was believed to be cancelled due to the Six Nations final being held in Twickenham, Mr Birling attempted to charter a flight to Timbuktu to spite his wife; due to a civil war in Mali, MJN Air attempted to deceive Mr Birling by chartering a flight to Sardinia and passing it off as Timbuktu.

In the third and fourth series, the crew encounter Gordon Shappey (Timothy West), who is Carolyn's ex-husband, Arthur's father, a very shady scrap merchant, businessman, pilot, and Gerti's former owner. He attempts underhanded schemes to gain his plane back, the first being in the episode St Petersburg, after Gerti suffers a bird strike that wrecks an engine, when he attempted to steal her by posing as a member of MJN. In the finale it is revealed that he had hidden a great deal of his fortune of gold in the re-wiring of Gerti. He failed to convince Arthur that Gerti was only of sentimental value to him because he named it after his mother (which Arthur realised was a lie when he remembered that her name was Maude).

In the fourth series and series finale, Martin embarks on a relationship with Princess Theresa of Liechtenstein (Matilda Ziegler), who he meets when flying her to England from Vaduz in the episode of the same name. The two form an instant attraction to each other on discovering that they are both interested in planes and Theresa is openly supportive of Martin's ambitions to work for an airline that actually pays him. She can also be very firm when she needs to be and stands no nonsense — especially from her younger brother, the ten-year-old King Maximilian XIII of Liechtenstein — as she saves Martin from a haranguing from Carolyn after accidentally ordering too much fuel to accommodate a safe landing weight.

Appearing only once in the final series episode of "Wokingham", Martin Creiff's mother, Wendy is played by Prunella Scales, in an affectionate nod to her husband Timothy West playing the character of Arthur's father, Gordon Shappey. She often "does not want to make a fuss", which causes difficulty for Martin after she is hospitalised for angina and needs to be cared for.
