= Quibble Island =

River island in Chennai, India

Coordinates: 13°01′18″N 80°16′20″E

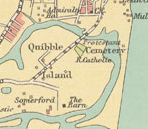
Location of Quibble Island. From a 1909 map of the then Madras city

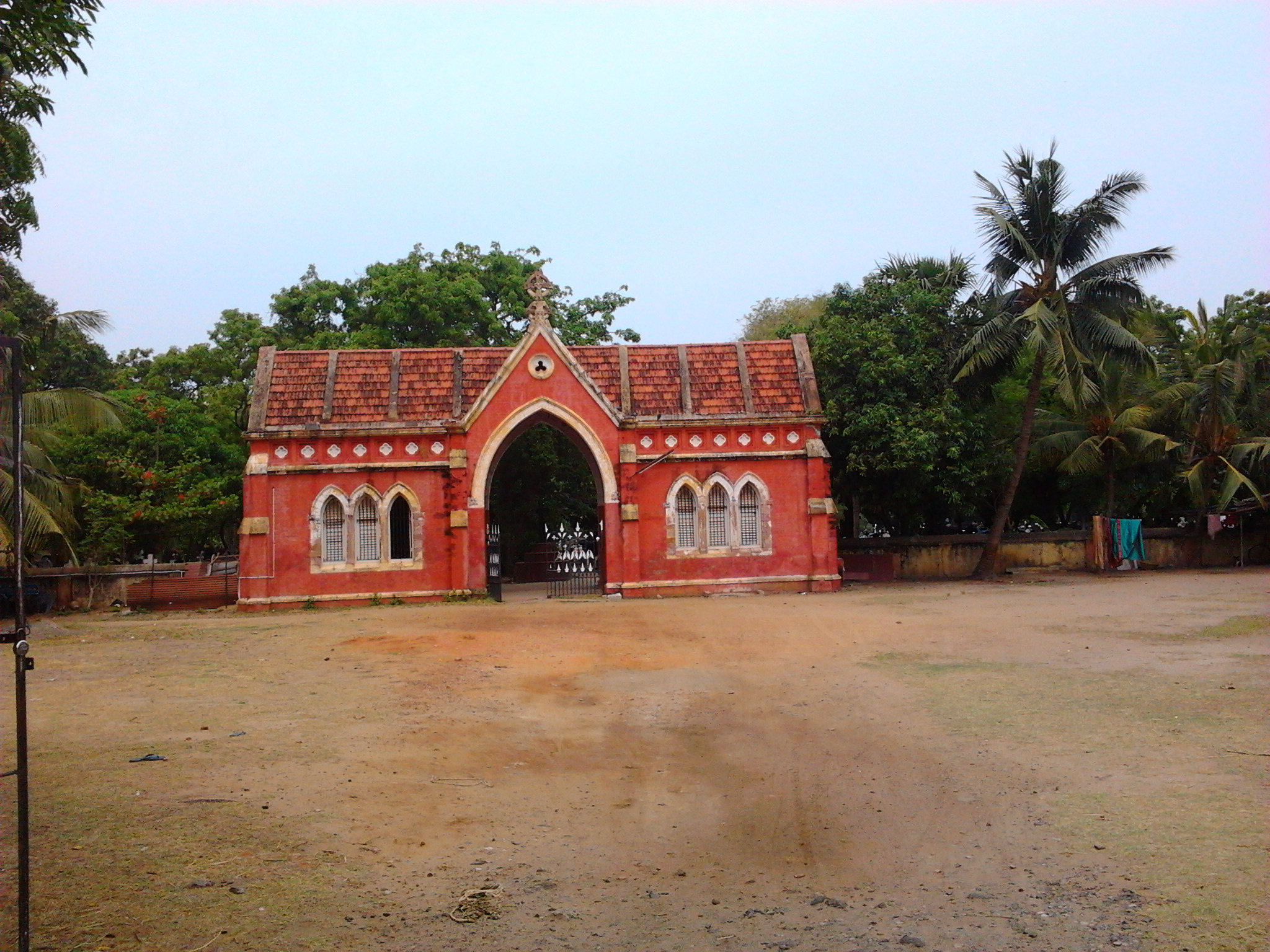
Quibble-Island Cemetery

Quibble Island is a river island in the city of Chennai, Tamil Nadu, India. Prior to British colonization, it was not an island but a network of inter-tidal channels. It is formed by the encirclement of the Adyar River and one of its tributaries. It is situated between the neighbourhoods of Mylapore and Adyar. It abuts the southern stretch of the Marina Beach. During the British rule, a European cemetery was located here. It also houses the grave of famous actor J. P. Chandrababu.

James Brodie (1769-1801), a British civil servant and businessman, was granted 11 acres on Quibble Island in 1796 and built Brodie Castle. Quibble Island was first shown as having two properties in a survey from 1798 but marked blank in 1816.

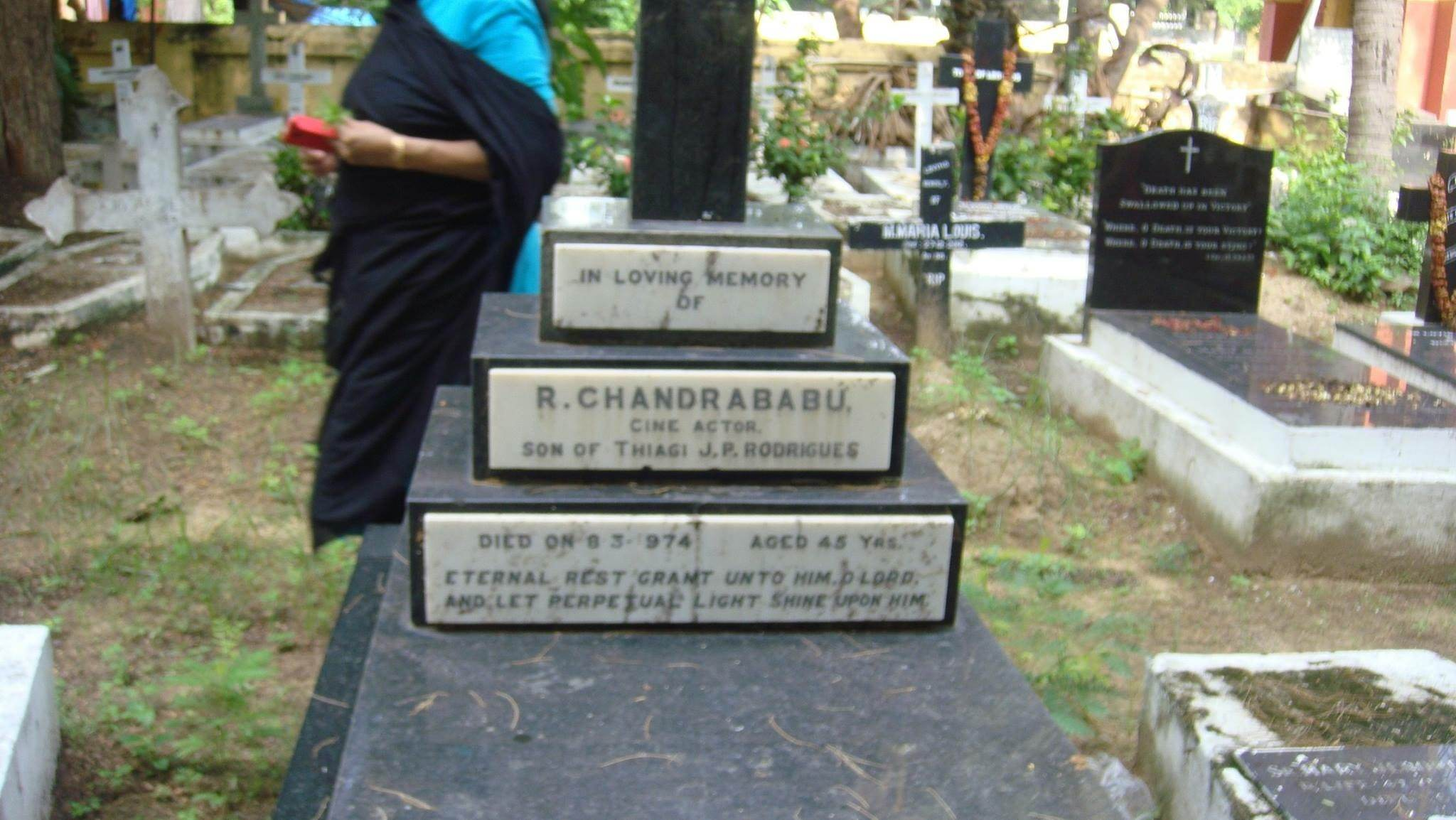
Chandrababu's grave in Quibble Island Cemetery.
