= Alexander Brodie, Lord Brodie =

Scottish diarist

Alexander Brodie of Brodie
- Born: 25 July 1617; Brodie, Elginshire
- Died: 17 April 1680 (aged 62)
- Education: King's College, Aberdeen
- Occupation(s): Lord of Session, Shire Commissioner, Commissioner to meet Charles II at the Hague
- Notable work: The Diary of Alexander Brodie of Brodie
- Spouse: Widow of John Urquhart of Craigston
- Children: 1 son (James Brodie), 1 daughter
- Parent(s): David Brodie of Brodie and Grizzel (née Dunbar)

Alexander Brodie (1617–1680), of Brodie, lord of session, was a notable Scottish diarist of the 17th century. He was Chief of Clan Brodie, and resided at Brodie Castle in Elginshire.

== Early life ==
Brodie, born on 25 July 1617, was the eldest son of David Brodie of Brodie and Grizzel, daughter of Thomas Dunbar, and niece on her mother's side of the Admirable Crichton. In 1628 he was sent to England, where he remained till 1632. In the latter year he enrolled as a student in King's College, Aberdeen, but he didn't take a degree. On 19 May 1636 he was served as heir of his father by a dispensation of the lords of council, and on 28 Oct. of the same year he married the widow of John Urquhart of Craigston, by whom he had a son, James Brodie, and a daughter.

== Iconoclast ==
Brodie was a strong Presbyterian, and, in December 1640, headed a party which demolished two oil paintings of the Crucifixion of Jesus and the Day of Judgment in the cathedral of Elgin. He also mutilated the finely carved interior of the building as unsuitable for a place of worship. This extreme puritanical zeal exposed him to the revenge of Montrose, who, in February 1645, burned and devastated his property, and carried off the family papers of the house of Brodie.

== Shire commissioner ==
In 1643 he was chosen as Shire Commissioner for the county of Elgin in parliament, and frequently served on parliamentary committees. He was also elected a representative to the general assembly of the church of Scotland. On 6 March 1649 he was appointed a commissioner to meet Charles II at the Hague.

== Lord of Session ==
After Brodie's return from the Hague he was nominated a lord of session on 22 June. He took the oaths in the presence of parliament on 23 July, and took his seat on the bench on 1 Nov. In February 1650 he was sent as commissioner of the general assembly to Breda, to induce the king to sign the national covenant. He was also a member of the various committees of estates during the attempt of Charles to wrest from Cromwell his dominion. In June 1653 he was cited by Cromwell to London to arrange for a union between the two kingdoms, but did not obey the summons, and 'resolved', as he expressed it, 'in the strength of the Lord to eschew and avoid employment under Cromwell.' He retired to his estate until Cromwell's death, when, on 3 Dec. 1658, he again took his seat on the bench. At the Restoration he was superseded and was also subjected to a fine of £4,000, Scots. In 1661 he paid a lengthy visit to London. He died on 17 April 1680.

== Diary ==
The Diary of Alex. Brodie, from 25 April 1652 to 1 Feb. 1654, was published in Edinburgh in 1740 by an unknown editor. The complete Diary, from 1650 to 17 April 1680, with a continuation by his son, James Brodie (1637-1708), to February 1685, was published by the Spalding Club in 1863, with an introduction by David Laing. The part published in 1740 is chiefly concerned with his religious experiences, and is not an adequate sample of the Diary as a whole, which conveys much important information regarding political events, and a specially interesting account of his visit to London, and of the persons with whom he there came into contact. See also Shaw's History of the Province of Moray; Genealogy of the Brodie family, by William Brodie (1862).
