= Zsigmond Bródy =

Sigmund Brody, or Bródy Zsigmond (November 15, 1840, Miskolc - January 6, 1906, Budapest ) was a Hungarian journalist, and member of the Upper House of the Hungarian Parliament.

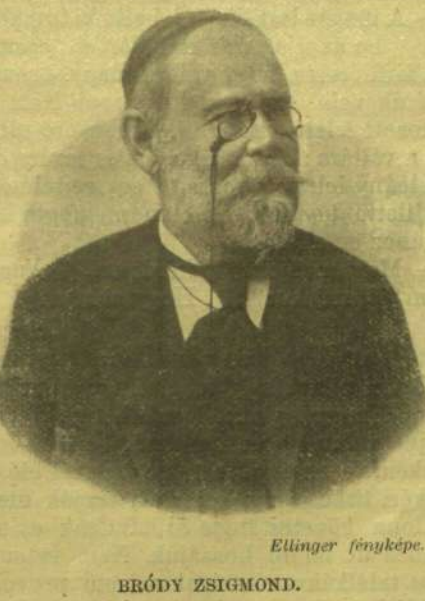
Zsigmond Bródy

== Life ==
He attended the gymnasium at Budapest, and late studied law at the university. He began his journalistic activity early in life, and in 1859 published his first leader. As early as 1860 he occupied the post of editor of the "Pesti Hölgydivatlap," and in conjunction with Károly Grósz founded the German periodical "Pannonia," whose purpose was the publication of Hungarian literature in the form of critical studies and translations. In 1859-60 he wrote some poems, as well as a number of hymns for the Jewish congregation, which are still in use. As collaborator on the "Magyar Sajtó," he became very widely known as a journalist of the first rank.

After the compromise with Austria (1867), Bródy was associated with Sigmund Kemény as editorial writer on the "Pesti Napló". This was the most brilliant period of his career as publicist, his sound logic and comprehensive views being especially noticeable. In 1872, he became secretary at the Ministry of the Interior, but voluntarily resigned this position; a year later he purchased the "Neues Pester Journal, "which paper under his management attained an unprecedented circulation throughout the country. His nephew Daniel Bródy inherited the newspaper and became its editor-in-chief.

Bródy was also a distinguished philanthropist, and on the anniversary of his fiftieth birthday he donated 100,000 gulden to journalistic institutions. Further donations to the amount of 250,000 gulden were made in memory of his wife. In 1896 he was appointed a life-member of the House of Magnates.

== Bibliography ==
- Szinnyei, Magyar Irók Tóra
- Pallas Nagy Lexicona, s.v.
