= Brodie baronets of Boxford (1834) =

Escutcheon of the Brodie baronets of Boxford

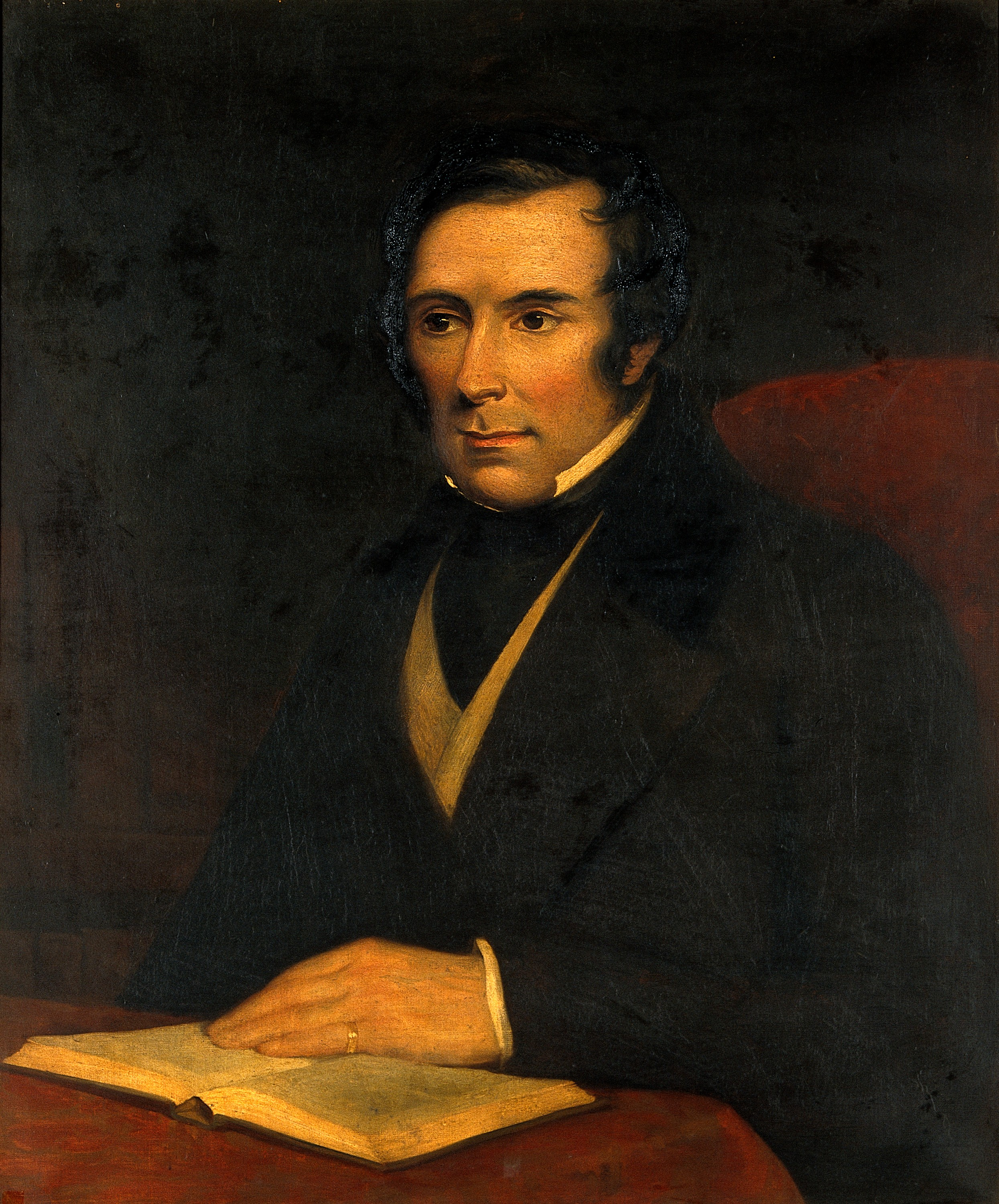
Sir Benjamin Collins Brodie, 1st Baronet

The Brodie baronetcy, of Boxford in the County of Suffolk, was created in the Baronetage of the United Kingdom on 30 August 1834 for the noted physiologist and surgeon Benjamin Collins Brodie. He was succeeded by his eldest son, the 2nd Baronet, Waynflete Professor of Chemistry at the University of Oxford from 1855 to 1872.

His son, the 3rd Baronet, was a Justice of the Peace, Deputy Lieutenant and High Sheriff of Surrey. As of 2026 the title is dormant.

== Brodie baronets, of Boxford (1834) ==
- Sir Benjamin Collins Brodie, 1st Baronet (1783–1862)
- Sir Benjamin Collins Brodie, 2nd Baronet (1817–1880)
- Sir Benjamin Vincent Sellon Brodie, 3rd Baronet (1862–1938)
- Sir Benjamin Collins Brodie, MC and bar, 4th Baronet (1888–1971)
- (Benjamin) David Ross Brodie, presumed 5th Baronet (1925–2021). His name did not appear on the Official Roll.
- Alan Ross Brodie, presumed 6th Baronet (born 1960). The presumed heir apparent is his son Justyn Richard Brodie (born 1997).

== Notes ==
Baronetage of the United Kingdom
Preceded by Hammick baronets	Brodie baronets of Boxford; 30 August 1834	Succeeded by Booth baronets
