= Edward E. Brodie =

American diplomat and newspaper executive

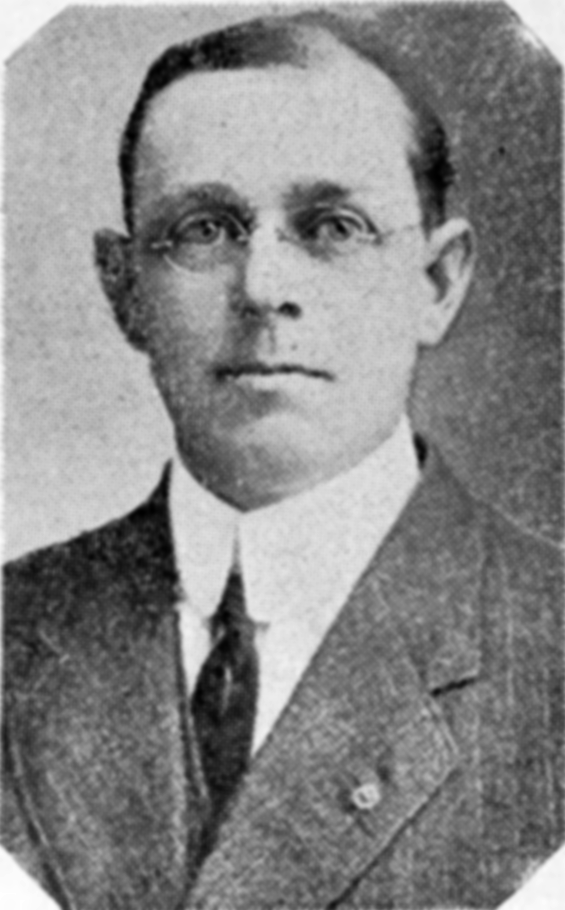

Edward Everett Brodie (1876–1939) was an American diplomat and newspaper executive. He was a non-career appointee as American Envoy Extraordinary and Minister Plenipotentiary to Thailand (January 31, 1922 – May 2, 1925) and Minister to Finland (May 16, 1930 – September 21, 1933). He headed the Oregon State Editorial Association and the National Editorial Association.

Brodie was the publisher of the Oregon City Enterprise. Brodie bought the paper on February 7, 1908, and remained publisher until January 1, 1935. In 1935 Brodie joined the San Francisco advertising agency Bowman, Deute, Cummings, Inc. as head of operations, and worked there for three years.

He briefly attended the University of Oregon.

He was married Imogen Harding Brodie on July 17, 1905.

Brodie died of a heart attack in Salem, Oregon in 1939.
