= David Brodie =

David Brodie may refer to:

- David Brodie (field hockey) (1910–1996), British Olympic field hockey player
- David Brodie (political strategist) (born 1974), senior organizer for the Liberal Party of Canada
- David Brodie (racing driver) (1943–2024), British auto racing driver
- David Brodie (Royal Navy officer) (1709–1787), captain in the Royal Navy
- David A. Brodie (1867–1951), American football coach at Washington State University

== See also ==
- David Brody (disambiguation)
