= Broady =

Broady is an English surname. Notable people with the surname include:

- Brandon Broady (born 1986), American actor
- Carlos Broady (born 1972), American record producer
- Earl Broady (1904–1992), American judge, attorney, police officer and pianist
- Eloise Broady DeJoria (born 1957), American business owner, actress, producer, and philanthropist
- Liam Broady (born 1994), British tennis player, brother of Naomi
- Kristen Broady, economist and academic
- Naomi Broady (born 1990), British tennis player, sister of Liam
- Oscar Broady (1832–1922), Swedish petty officer and American brigade commander

== See also ==
- Broady Valley
- Broadmeadows, Victoria
