= Sir Benjamin Collins Brodie, 1st Baronet =

English physiologist and surgeon (1783–1862)

Sir Benjamin Collins Brodie Bt FRS
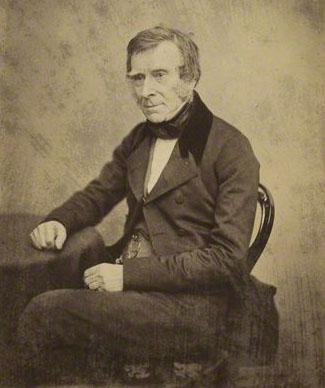
- Sir Benjamin Collins Brodie, 1st Baronet
- Born: 9 June 1783; Winterslow, Wiltshire, England
- Died: 21 October 1862 (aged 79); Surrey, England
- Scientific career
- Fields: Physiology

29th President of the Royal Society
- In office 1858–1861
- Preceded by: John Wrottesley
- Succeeded by: Edward Sabine

Sir Benjamin Collins Brodie, 1st Baronet, FRS (9 June 1783 – 21 October 1862) was an English physiologist and surgeon who pioneered research into bone and joint disease.

== Biography ==
Coat of arms of Sir Benjamin Brodie

Brodie was born in Winterslow, Wiltshire. He received his early education from his father, the Rev Peter Bellinger Brodie; then choosing medicine as his profession he went to London in 1801 and attended the lectures of John Abernethy and attended Charterhouse School. Two years later he became a pupil of Sir Everard Home at St George's Hospital, and in 1808 was appointed assistant surgeon at that institution, on the staff of which he served for over thirty years. In 1810 he was elected a fellow of the Royal Society, to which in the next four or five years he contributed several papers describing original investigations in physiology. In 1834, he was elected a foreign member of the Royal Swedish Academy of Sciences.

During this period he also rapidly obtained a large and lucrative practice and from time to time wrote on surgical questions, contributing numerous papers to the Medical and Chirurgical Society (of which he was President in 1839) and to the medical journals. His most important work is widely acknowledged to be the 1818 treatise Pathological and Surgical Observations on the Diseases of the Joints, in which he attempts to trace the beginnings of disease in the different tissues that form a joint and to give an exact value to the symptom of pain as evidence of organic disease. This volume led to the adoption by surgeons of more conservative measures in the treatment of diseases of the joints, with the consequent reduction in the number of amputations and the saving of many limbs and lives. He also wrote on diseases of the urinary organs and on local nervous affections of a surgical character.

In 1854 he published anonymously a volume of Psychological Inquiries "... to illustrate ... the Mental Faculties" — by the third edition of 1856, it bore his name. Eight years later, in 1862, a "Second Part" on " ... the Physical and Moral History of Man" appeared. He received many honours during his career and attended to the health of the Royal Family, starting with George IV. He was also sergeant-surgeon to William IV and Queen Victoria and was made a baronet in 1834. He became a corresponding member of the French Institute in 1844, a Foreign Honorary Member of the American Academy of Arts and Sciences and DCL of Oxford in 1855, president of the Royal Society in 1858 and subsequently, the first president of the General Medical Council.

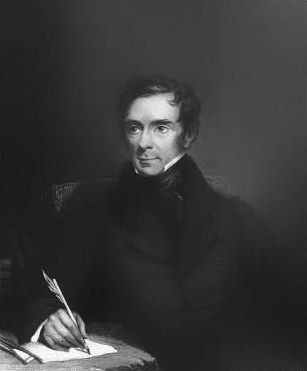
Sir Benjamin Collins Brodie, engraving after Henry Room

In 1858 Henry Gray dedicated his work Gray's Anatomy to Sir Benjamin Collins Brodie.

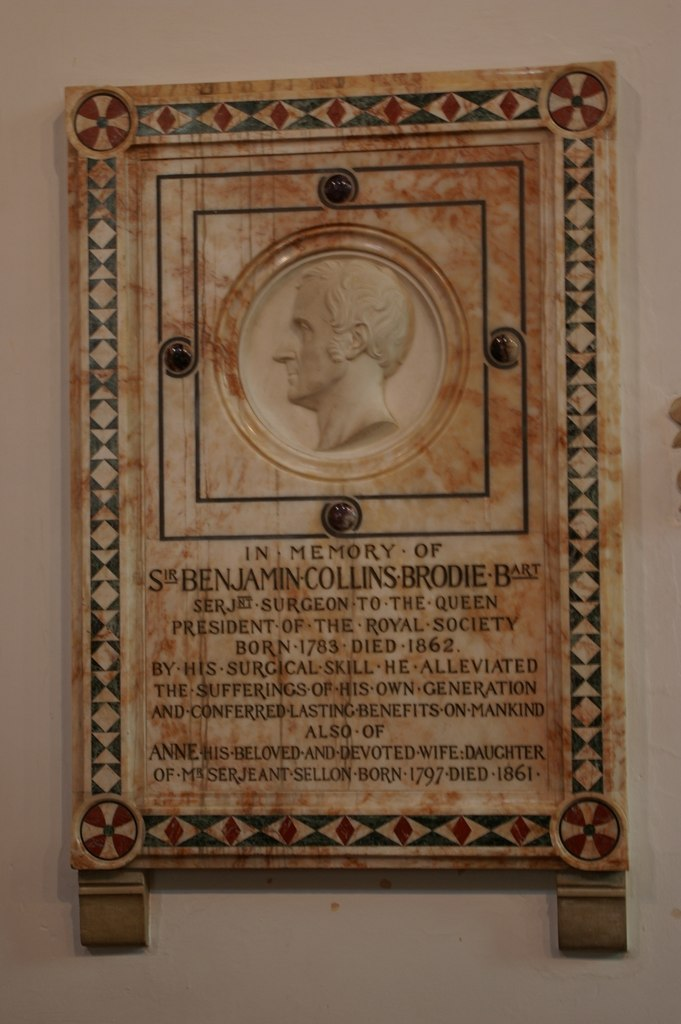
Memorial in Betchworth church

Sir Benjamin Collins Brodie died of a shoulder tumour in Broome Park, Surrey at the age of 79. His collected works, with autobiography, were published in 1865 under the editorship of Charles Hawkins. (Timothy Holmes wrote a 255-page biography Sir Benjamin Collins Brodie (1898).)

In 1816 Brodie married Anne Sellon, daughter of an eminent lawyer and they had several children of whom three survived into maturity. His eldest son was the Oxford chemist Sir Benjamin Collins Brodie, 2nd Baronet.

== See also ==
- List of presidents of the Royal Society

== Bibliography ==
- Sheldrake, John S (2008), "Sir benjamin collins brodie (1783–1862).", Journal of Medical Biography, vol. 16, no. 2 (published May 2008), pp. 84–8, doi:10.1258/jmb.2007.007022, PMC 5049222, PMID 18463077
- Buchanan, W W (2003), "Sir Benjamin Collins Brodie (1783–1862).", Rheumatology (Oxford), vol. 42, no. 5 (published May 2003), pp. 689–91, doi:10.1093/rheumatology/keg002, PMID 12709547
- Waugh, M A (1989), "Benjamin Collins Brodie 1783–1862.", Journal of the Royal Society of Medicine, vol. 82, no. 5 (published May 1989), p. 318, doi:10.1177/014107688908200531, PMC 1292152, PMID 2666664
- Hill, G (1988), "Benjamin Collins Brodie 1783–1862.", Journal of the Royal Society of Medicine, vol. 81, no. 11 (published November 1988), pp. 677–8, doi:10.1177/014107688808101131, PMC 1291862, PMID 3062171
- Bircher, M D (1988), "Benjamin Collins Brodie 1783–1862.", Journal of the Royal Society of Medicine, vol. 81, no. 6 (published June 1988), pp. 352–3, doi:10.1177/014107688808100618, PMC 1291631, PMID 3043004
- Collins Brodie, SIR Bejamin (1968), "Further experiments and observations on the action of poisons on the animal systems by Sir Benjamin Collins Brodie.", International Anesthesiology Clinics, vol. 6, no. 2, pp. 425–6, doi:10.1097/00004311-196806020-00006, PMID 4895823
- Collins Broide, SIR Benjamin (1968), "Experiments and observations on the different modes in which death is produced by certain vegetable poisons by Sir Benjamin Collins Brodie.", International Anesthesiology Clinics, vol. 6, no. 2, pp. 423–4, doi:10.1097/00004311-196806020-00005, PMID 4895822
- "Sir Benjamin Collins Brodie (1783–1862).", JAMA, vol. 200, no. 4 (published 24 April 1967), pp. 331–2, 1967, doi:10.1001/jama.200.4.331, PMC 5049222, PMID 5337222
- Banov, L; Duncan, M E (1966), "The sentinel pile and Sir Benjamin Collins Brodie.", Surgery, Gynaecology & Obstetrics, vol. 123, no. 2 (published August 1966), pp. 362–6, PMID 5330491
- HALL, D P (1965), "Our Surgical Heritage: Europe: Benjamin Collins Brodie.", Am. J. Surg., vol. 109 (published May 1965), p. 688, PMID 14281902
- Media related to Benjamin Collins Brodie (physiologist) at Wikimedia Commons

Baronetage of the United Kingdom
New creation	Baronet (of Boxford); 1834–1862	Succeeded by Benjamin Collins Brodie
Professional and academic associations
Preceded by John Wrottesley	29th President of the Royal Society; 1858–1861	Succeeded by Edward Sabine
