= David Brody =

David Brody may refer to:

- David Brody (historian) (born 1930), American professor emeritus of history at the University of California-Davis
- David Brody (journalist) (born 1965), Christian Broadcasting News senior
- David Brody, American comedy writer, radio producer and host of The Brooklyn Boys podcast

== See also ==
- David S. Broder (1929–2011), Washington Post journalist and television pundit
- David Brodie (disambiguation)
