= Booth baronets of Portland Place (1835) =

Escutcheon of the Booth baronets of Portland Place

The Booth baronetcy, of Portland Place in the County of London, was created in the Baronetage of the United Kingdom on 27 March 1835 for the gin distiller Sir Felix Booth. This title became extinct on the death of the 3rd Baronet in 1896.

== Booth baronets, of Portland Place (1835) ==
- Sir Felix Booth, 1st Baronet (1775–1850)
- Sir Williamson Booth, 2nd Baronet (1810–1877)
- Sir Charles Booth, 3rd Baronet (1812–1896)

== Notes ==
Baronetage of the United Kingdom
Preceded by Brodie baronets	Booth baronets of Portland Place; 27 March 1835	Succeeded by Forestier-Walker baronets
