= Howard M. Brody =

American physicist (1932–2015)

Howard Brody
- Born: July 11, 1932; Newark, New Jersey, U.S.
- Died: August 11, 2015 (aged 83); Bryn Mawr, Pennsylvania, U.S.
- Education: Massachusetts Institute of Technology (BS); California Institute of Technology (MS, PhD)
- Known for: Physics of tennis
- Spouse: Lois Chase (m. 1954; died 2011)
- Children: 3
- Awards: Tennis Educational Merit Award, International Tennis Hall of Fame (2000)
- Scientific career
- Fields: Physics
- Workplaces: University of Pennsylvania

Howard M. Brody (July 11, 1932 – August 11, 2015) was an American physicist who taught at the University of Pennsylvania from 1959 until 1999. Trained in particle physics, he took up the physics of tennis in the mid-1970s and published about 75 scientific papers and three books on the game. The New York Times described him as "the world's foremost physicist of tennis".

His measurements contradicted beliefs widely held among players, including the assumption that tighter strings produce more powerful shots. He served on technical and sport-science committees of the International Tennis Federation (ITF) and the United States Tennis Association (USTA) and advised several other tennis organizations.

== Early life and education ==
Brody was born in Newark, New Jersey, on July 11, 1932, and attended Weequahic High School there. He received a bachelor's degree in physics from the Massachusetts Institute of Technology in 1954 and played four years on its varsity tennis team. At the California Institute of Technology he earned a master's degree in 1956 and a doctorate in 1959, both in physics.

== Career ==
Brody joined the physics faculty of the University of Pennsylvania in 1959 and spent his entire academic career there. He retired in 1999 and became professor emeritus. His research for the first 25 years was in elementary particle and high-energy nuclear physics and included work at CERN in Geneva. During those years he studied with Murray Gell-Mann and Richard Feynman and carried out experiments at Fermilab and Brookhaven National Laboratory.

The American Physical Society elected him a fellow. For students outside the sciences Brody taught a popular course called World of Physics, built on classroom demonstrations rather than equations. In 1991 he served for part of the season as interim coach of the university's men's tennis team, winning all of its remaining matches.

== Tennis research ==
On a Florida vacation in the mid-1970s, Brody noticed one of the oversized rackets that the engineer Howard Head had recently brought to market under the Prince brand, and wondered whether the larger head actually made a racket better. The tennis professionals he asked did not know, so he began measuring rackets himself. His first paper on the game, "Physics of the Tennis Racket", appeared in the American Journal of Physics in 1979. Some 75 scientific articles on tennis followed. The 1979 paper drew wide press attention, and Brody later said the response helped persuade him to leave particle physics for tennis research. He also appeared several times as an expert witness in litigation over Head's oversized-racket patent.

Much of his laboratory work concerned the few milliseconds during which the ball and the strings are in contact. In a 1981 paper he identified three distinct sweet spots on a racket face: the center of percussion, the node of the frame's main vibration, and the area of highest coefficient of restitution. An impact at the first produces the least shock at the hand, an impact at the second causes the least vibration, and a ball struck in the third rebounds with the greatest speed. On an oversized racket the center of percussion sits closer to the middle of the head, which makes such rackets easier for many players to use. Other results ran against common belief. Stiff frames deliver more power than flexible ones, and loosely strung rackets more than tightly strung ones, because the strings return the energy they store far more efficiently than the ball. He also studied how long the ball dwells on the strings and the narrow range of angles at which a shot both clears the net and lands inside the baseline.

Brody wrote Science Made Practical for the Tennis Teacher (1986) for the United States Professional Tennis Registry and Tennis Science for Tennis Players (1987) for general readers. With Rod Cross and Crawford Lindsey he later wrote The Physics and Technology of Tennis (2002). With the coach Vic Braden he made the instructional video The Science and Myths of Tennis (1992). On television and radio Brody often explained the physics of the game, with appearances on Newton's Apple and the Australian series Beyond 2000.

In 1999 the ITF approved a two-year trial of tennis balls 8 percent larger for fast-court tournaments, an attempt to blunt the dominance of the serve that drew on research by Brody and other scientists showing the larger ball would give returners about 10 percent more time to react. Brody said he had originally proposed a 20 percent increase.

Brody looked at other sports as well. In a 1986 paper he showed that the center of percussion has no bearing on how well a baseball bat performs, and in 1990 he concluded that the batter's grip does not affect the speed of the ball leaving the bat. The Physics of Baseball website of the Illinois physicist Alan Nathan counts him among the pioneers of that field. Shorter papers took up the hardness of athletic surfaces and the use of radar guns.

Brody was a member of the ITF technical commission from 1997 to 2009 and of the USTA's sport science committee. He was science adviser to the Professional Tennis Registry, technical adviser to the United States Racquet Stringers Association, and a member of the technical advisory panel of Tennis magazine. The Professional Tennis Registry gave him its Plagenhoef Award for sport science in 1996, and in 2000 the International Tennis Hall of Fame presented him and David Benjamin with its Tennis Educational Merit Award. The ITF named the prize for the best research paper at its Tennis Science and Technology congresses after him, and Francesco Ricci Bitti, its president at the time of Brody's death, credited his research with prompting the federation to consider creating its technical centre in Roehampton. In its obituary, The Economist called him the world authority on the behaviour of racket strings and balls. In memorial tributes published by the Professional Tennis Registry, colleagues remembered him as the leading figure in tennis physics and a rare translator of research into coaching practice.

== Personal life ==
Brody was married to Lois Chase from 1954 until her death in 2011. They had three daughters, one of whom, Lisa Brody Foley, died in 1991. He lived in Haverford, Pennsylvania. When asked whether his research had improved his own game, he once joked that he would have been a great player if he had spent as much time on the courts as in the laboratory.

Brody died of complications of Parkinson's disease on August 11, 2015, at Bryn Mawr Hospital in Bryn Mawr, Pennsylvania, at the age of 83.

== Selected publications ==
- Brody, Howard (1979). "Physics of the tennis racket". American Journal of Physics. 47 (6): 482–487. doi:10.1119/1.11787.
- Brody, Howard (1981). "Physics of the tennis racket II: The 'sweet spot'". American Journal of Physics. 49 (9): 816–819. doi:10.1119/1.12399.
- Brody, Howard (1986). "The sweet spot of a baseball bat". American Journal of Physics. 54 (7): 640–643. doi:10.1119/1.14854.
- Brody, Howard (1986). Science Made Practical for the Tennis Teacher. United States Professional Tennis Registry.
- Brody, Howard (1990). "Models of baseball bats". American Journal of Physics. 58 (8): 756–758. doi:10.1119/1.16378.
- Brody, Howard (1987). Tennis Science for Tennis Players. University of Pennsylvania Press. ISBN 978-0-8122-1238-9.
- Brody, Howard (1995). "How would a physicist design a tennis racket?". Physics Today. 48 (3): 26–31. doi:10.1063/1.881444.
- Brody, Howard (1997). "The physics of tennis. III. The ball–racket interaction". American Journal of Physics. 65 (10): 981–987. doi:10.1119/1.18701.
- Brody, Howard; Cross, Rod; Lindsey, Crawford (2002). The Physics and Technology of Tennis. Racquet Tech Publishing. ISBN 978-0-9722759-0-3.
