= Ivan Brude Stone =

American politician

Ivan Brude Stone (February 23, 1907 – December 19, 1985) was an American farmer and politician.

Stone was born in Lake Hanska Township, Brown County, Minnesota. He went to the public schools in Minneapolis, Minnesota, and in New Ulm, Minnesota. Stone graduated from University of Minnesota College of Agriculture in 1930. Stone served in the United States Army from 1929 to 1943 and during World War II. He lived in New Ulm, Minnesota with his wife and family and was a farmer. Stone served in the Minnesota House of Representatives from 1961 to 1970 and was a Republican.
