= James Brodie (politician, born 1637) =

Scottish politician

James Brodie (15 September 1637 – March 1708) was a Scottish politician.

He was the only son of Sir Alexander Brodie, Lord Brodie (1617–1680), a Lord of Session.

He represented Elgin and Forfarshire in the 1689 Convention of the Estates of Scotland and Elginshire in the parliaments of 1689 to 1702 and 1703 to 1707 (sitting only to 1704).

He married Mary Kerr, a daughter of the 3rd Earl of Lothian, with whom he had 9 daughters.
