= Imogen Harding Brodie =

American singer (1878–1956)

- Born: June 8, 1878
- Died: August 16, 1956 (aged 78); Multnomah, Oregon, U.S.
- Occupation(s): Singer and vocal teacher
- Spouse: Edward Everett Brodie (m. 1905)

Imogen Harding Brodie (June 8, 1878 – August 16, 1956) was an American vocal teacher and contralto soloist; she was the wife of the American envoy to the court of King Rama VI of Siam.

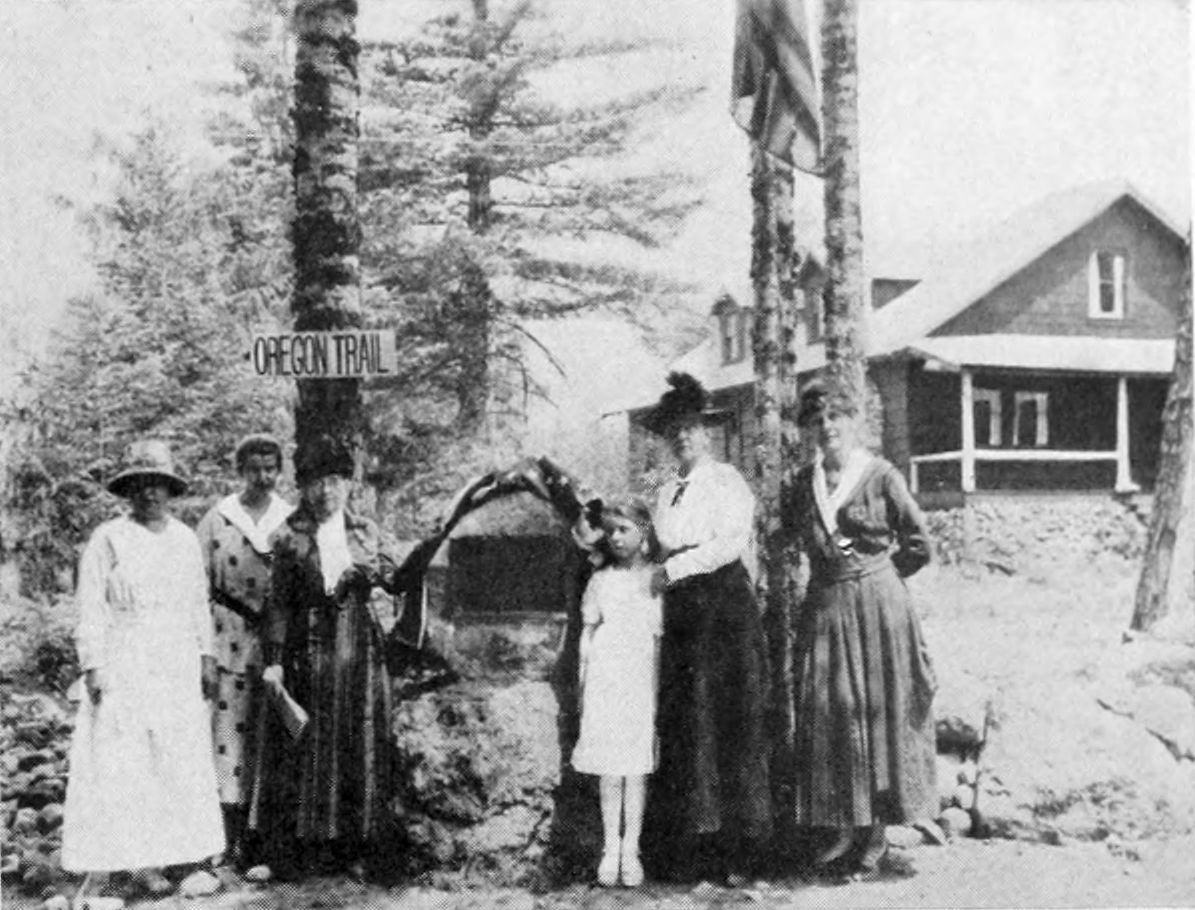
Imogen (left) in a photo of descendants of Sam Barlow (Daughters of the American Revolution magazine, January 1919)

== Early life ==
Imogen Harding Brodie was born on June 8, 1878, the daughter of George A. and Jennie B. Harding. She was the great-granddaughter of Samuel K. Barlow. Brodie's great-grandmother was Susanna Lee of South Carolina, whose father, William Lee, was a lieutenant of artillery in the Revolutionary war.

== Career ==
Brodie was active in civic affairs. She was a vocal teacher until 1915. For many years she was a contralto soloist in various Portland churches. From 1921 to 1925, she moved to Bangkok, where her husband was the American Envoy to the court of King Rama VI.

She was a member of the Professional Woman's League of Portland.

== Personal life ==
In 1905, she married Edward Everett Brodie (1876–1939), a leader among newspaper men, and had two children, Madelen Jane and George Harding. She lived at Brodacre-on-Clackamas, Ore. R. F. D. 2, Oregon City, Oregon.

She died aged 78 on August 16, 1956, in Multnomah, Oregon.
