= Brodie Westen =

American football coach (1932–2021)

Biographical details
- Born: June 13, 1932; Marquette, Michigan, U.S.
- Died: July 29, 2021 (aged 89); Macomb, Illinois, U.S.

Coaching career (HC unless noted)
- 1958–1960: Illinois (freshmen line)
- 1961–1965: Rockford West HS (IL)
- 1968–1970: Illinois (freshmen)
- 1971–1973: Western Illinois (assistant)
- 1974–1975: Western Illinois

Head coaching record
- Overall: 12–7–1 (college)

Brodie Curtis Westen (June 13, 1932 – July 29, 2021) was an American football coach. He served as the head football coach at Western Illinois University in Macomb, Illinois for two seasons, from 1974 to 1975, compiling a record of 12–7–1.

Westen was born on June 13, 1932, in Marquette, Michigan. He graduated from Graveraet High School in Marquette before serving in the United States Navy on the USS Juneau during the Korean War. Westen returned to Marquette and graduated from Northern Michigan University. He began his coaching career as an assistant football coach at the University of Illinois Urbana-Champaign, serving as freshman line coach. Westen was the head football coach at Rockford West High School in Rockford, Illinois from 1961 to 1965.

Westen died on July 29, 2021, in Macomb.

== Head coaching record ==
=== College ===
Year	Team	Overall	Conference	Standing	Bowl/playoffs
Western Illinois Leathernecks (NCAA Division II independent) (1974–1975)
1974	Western Illinois	7–3			
1975	Western Illinois	5–4–1			
Western Illinois:		12–7–1			
Total:		12–7–1			
