= David Brodie (political strategist) =

Canadian political consultant

David Brodie (born June 10, 1974) is a Canadian political strategist, and communications consultant with Citizen Relations, a global public relations firm. He heads up the firm's office in Vancouver, British Columbia as senior vice president and general manager. He was born in Edmonton, Alberta, Canada.

== Career ==
=== Political career ===
David served in the Office of the Rt. Hon. Paul Martin, Prime Minister of Canada as the Senior Special Assistant for Northern and Western Canada. He was responsible for policy and issues management and the operational aspects of leading prime ministerial tours and events throughout the region. Prior to this, David held the position of National Director of Operations on the Paul Martin Federal Liberal leadership campaign in 2002, and served from 1998 to 2002 as a senior political advisor in the Office of the Minister of Finance. In this role he coordinated Ministerial events in every province and territory of Canada, and served on the task forces responsible for coordinating meetings of the Commonwealth, G-8, APEC and G-20. During this time he was named one of the top 20 political staffer on Parliament Hill by the Hill Times.

His political involvement also includes time working for Judy Bethel (Liberal MP- Edmonton East), Nicholas Taylor (former leader of the Alberta Liberal Party and Senator) and serving as the president of the Alberta Young Liberals.

In the 2011 B.C. Liberal leadership contest Brodie supported the candidacy of Premier Christy Clark.

=== Crisis response work ===
Apart from his political involvement, David Brodie is also recognized as a leading authority on crisis communications. He has led large scale emergency exercise projects for both the Canadian Embassy in Tokyo and the British Embassy in Tokyo, and been a commentator on crisis communications on CBC and the Vancouver Sun. He also worked as a volunteer on tsunami relief efforts in Thailand in 2005.

=== International work ===
David has traveled extensively in the Asia Pacific region and created and hosted a popular podcast, Travel in 10, focusing on international travel. He is a trustee of the Jack Webster Foundation, a former director of the Board of the Greater Vancouver Food Bank and a member of the Canadian Ship for World Youth Alumni Association, an international exchange program focused of promoting international cooperation, sponsored through the Government of Japan.

== Honors and awards ==
In 2013 his agency was named the Canadian PR Agency of the Year by the Homes Report and a campaign he developed with Tourism British Columbia was named best North American Travel and Tourism PR campaign by the Sabre awards in 2012.
