= Sir Benjamin Collins Brodie, 2nd Baronet =

English chemist

Sir Benjamin Collins Brodie, Bt
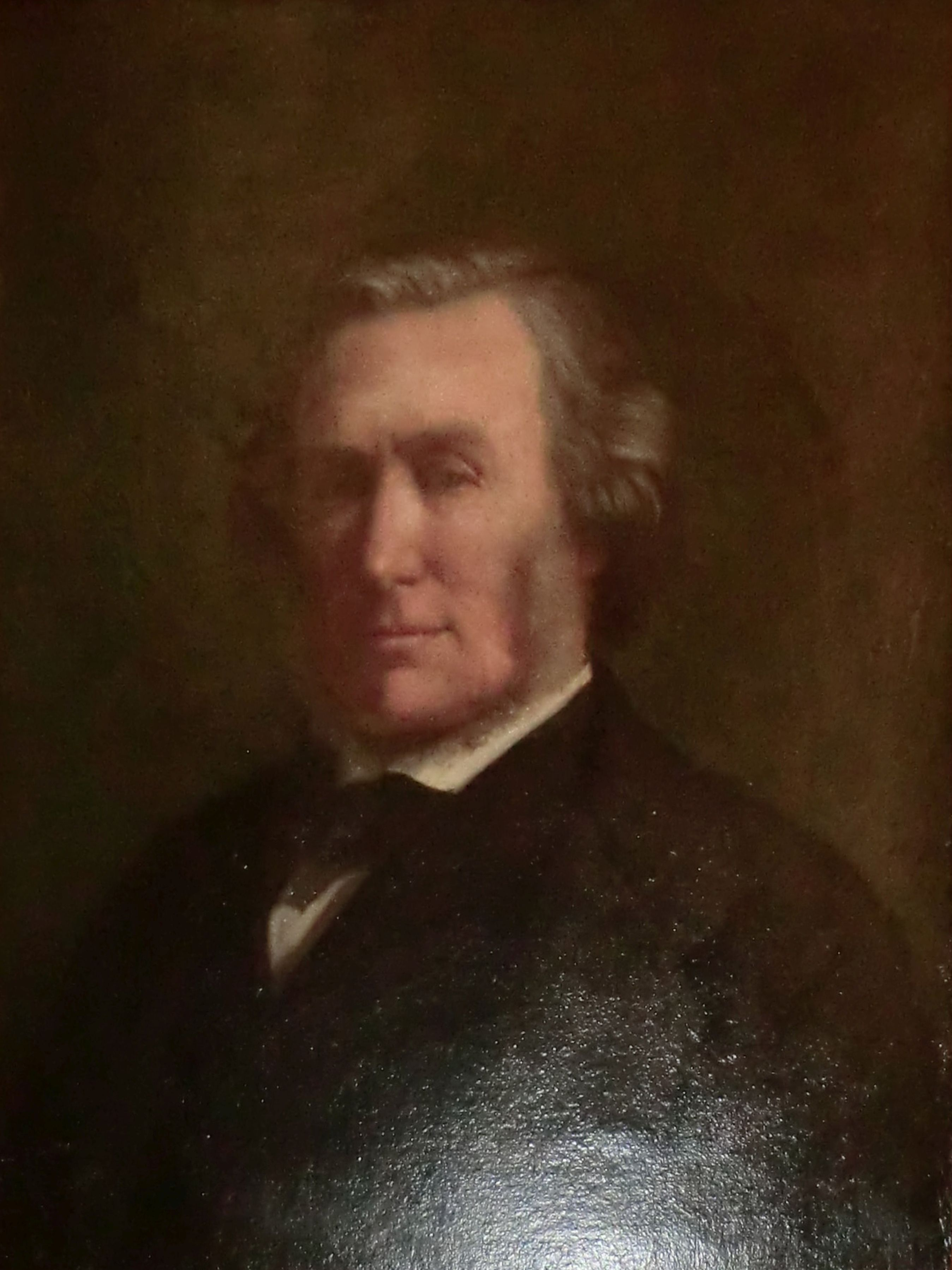
- Portrait, initialled and dated: "E.A. 1874"
- Born: 15 March 1817; London, England
- Died: 24 November 1880 (aged 63); St Clare, Isle of Wight, England
- Education: Balliol College, Oxford; University of Giessen
- Known for: Analysis of beeswax, work on peroxides
- Awards: Royal Medal (1850)
- Scientific career
- Fields: Physical chemistry
- Workplaces: University of Oxford
- Academic advisors: Justus von Liebig
- Doctoral students: Augustus George Vernon Harcourt

Brodie's Coat of arms

Sir Benjamin Collins Brodie, 2nd Baronet FRS (5 February 1817 – 24 November 1880) was an English chemist.

== Biography ==
Brodie was the son of Sir Benjamin Collins Brodie, 1st Baronet, and his wife Anne (Née Sellon), and was educated at Harrow School and Balliol College, Oxford. He obtained a second-class honours degree in mathematics in 1838. Because he was an agnostic and would not assent to the Thirty-nine articles, he was refused a MA until 1860. He studied chemistry with Justus von Liebig in Giessen along with Alexander Williamson. At Giessen, he did an original analysis of beeswax for which he was given the Fellowship of the Royal Society in 1849 and awarded the Royal Medal in 1850.

Brodie did important original work on peroxides in his private laboratory where he taught Nevil Story Maskelyne chemistry. He was secretary of the Chemical Society from 1850 to 1854 and its president in 1860. However, he opposed the atomic theory and proposed in 1866 his Calculus of Chemical Operations as a non-atomic alternative to the atomic theory. He saw an advertisement for wooden balls and wire for building models of molecules. This provoked him into describing atomic theory as a "thoroughly materialistic bit of joiner's work".

Despite opposition from some theological fellows, he was elected to the Aldrichan Chair (later renamed as the Waynflete Professor of Chemistry) at Oxford University 1865 to 1872, and is chiefly known for his investigations on the allotropic states of carbon and his discovery of graphitic acid.

Brodie married Philothea Margaret, daughter of John Vincent Thompson, in 1848. They had one son and five daughters. He died in November 1880, aged 63, and was succeeded in the baronet by his only son Benjamin. Lady Brodie died in 1882.

== Bibliography ==
- HYLE Biography
- Leigh Rayment's list of baronets
- Lundy, Darryl. "FAQ". The Peerage.

Baronetage of the United Kingdom
Preceded by Benjamin Collins Brodie	Baronet (of Boxford); 1862–1880	Succeeded by Benjamin Vincent Sellon Brodie
