= Bridei =

Bridei (also Brude, Bruide, Breidei or Bred) is a name shared by a number of Pictish people, including:

- Bridei I (Brude son of Maelchon, r. 554–584), contemporary of Saint Columba
- Bridei II (Brude son of Foith, r. 635–641)
- Bridei son of Beli (Bridei III, r. 672–693)
- Bridei IV (Brude son of Der-Ilei and Dargart, r. 697–706)
- Bridei V (Brude son of Fergus, r. 761–763)
- Bridei VI (Brude son of Ferat, r. 842–843)
- Bridei VII (Brude son of Fothel, r. 843–845)
- Brude son of Óengus I, died 736

== See also ==
- The Bridei Chronicles, a series of historical fantasy novels by Juliet Marillier about Bridei I
- Ivan Brude Stone (1907–1985), American businessman and politician
