= James Brodie (Scottish cricketer) =

Scottish cricketer

Personal information
- Full name: James Lothian Brodie
- Born: 17 October 1893; Glasgow, Lanarkshire, Scotland
- Died: 2 July 1939 (aged 45); Glasgow, Lanarkshire, Scotland
- Batting: Right-handed

Domestic team information
- Years: Team
- 1924–1925: Scotland

Career statistics
Competition	First-class
Matches	3
Runs scored	57
Batting average	11.40
100s/50s	–/–
Top score	20
Catches/stumpings	–/–
- Source: Cricinfo, 20 July 2022

James Lothian Brodie MC (17 October 1893 — 2 July 1939) was a Scottish first-class cricketer and British Army officer.

Brodie was born at Glasgow in October 1893. He served in the First World War in the British Army, initially as a warrant officer with the rank of lance sergeant in the York and Lancaster Regiment. In February 1917, he was commissioned as a temporary second lieutenant in the Highland Light Infantry. In May of the same year, he was awarded the Military Cross for conspicuous gallantry whilst leading a platoon. He was appointed an acting captain while commanding a company in April 1918, followed by promotion to acting lieutenant in August 1918.

After the war he played club cricket for Clydesdale Cricket Club and was selected to play for Scotland in 1924, playing two first-class matches against Ireland at Dundee and Wales at Swansea. He made a third appearance the following year against Lancashire at Old Trafford during Scotland's tour of England. In his three matches, Brodie scored 57 runs at an average of 11.40, with a highest score of 20. Outside of cricket, Brodie was a soft goods agent in Glasgow and was a partner in the business Brodie and Colvin. In July 1934, he was convicted of customs offences at Dover Police Court and was ordered to pay £480. Brodie died at Glasgow in July 1939.
