= Elginshire (Parliament of Scotland constituency) =

Constituency of the Old Parliament of Scotland

Before the Acts of Union 1707, the barons of the shire of Elgin and Forres (later called Moray) elected commissioners to represent them in the unicameral Parliament of Scotland and in the Convention of the Estates.

From 1708 Elginshire was represented by one Member of Parliament in the House of Commons of Great Britain.

== List of shire commissioners ==
- 1612: Robert Innes of that Ilk
- 1639–41, 1648: Sir Robert Innes, 1st Baronet
- 1649: Sir Ludovic Gordon, 2nd Baronet
- 1661–63: Thomas McKenzie of Plascarden
- 1661–63, 1678 convention: Sir Robert Innes, 2nd Baronet
- 1665 convention: Sir Robert Innes of Muirtoun
- 1665 convention, 1667 convention: Patrick Dunbar of Belnaferie
- 1669–70: Sir Robert Dunbar of Grangehill
- 1669–70: Sir Alexander Douglas of Spynie
- 1678 convention: Sir Robert Innes, the elder, of that Ilk
- 1681–82: Ludovick Grant of Freuquhie
- 1681–82: Sir Thomas Dunbar of Grange
- 1685–86: Sir Alexander Innes, 1st Baronet
- 1685–86: James Calder of Muirton
- 1689 convention, 1689–1702, 1702–1704: James Brodie of that Ilk
- 1689 convention, 1689–1693: Thomas Dunbar of Grange
- 1696: Sir Robert Gordon, 3rd Baronet
- 1698–1702, 1702: Alexander Dunbar of Westfield (sheriff) (died c1702)
- 1703–05: Robert Dunbar of Grangehill (died c.1705)
- 1704–07: Sir Harry Innes, 4th Baronet

== See also ==
- Elgin (Parliament of Scotland constituency)
- Forres (Parliament of Scotland constituency)
