= Alexander Brody =

Alexander Brody may refer to:

- Sándor Bródy (writer) (1863–1924), Hungarian author and journalist
- Sandy Brody (born 1967), American racing driver
- Sándor Bródy (footballer) (1884–1944), Hungarian football player
- Alexander Brody (businessman) (1933–2022), Hungarian business executive and writer

== See also ==
- Alexander Brodie (disambiguation)
