= Thenral =

House in Chennai, India

Coordinates: 13.015855°N 80.262857°E

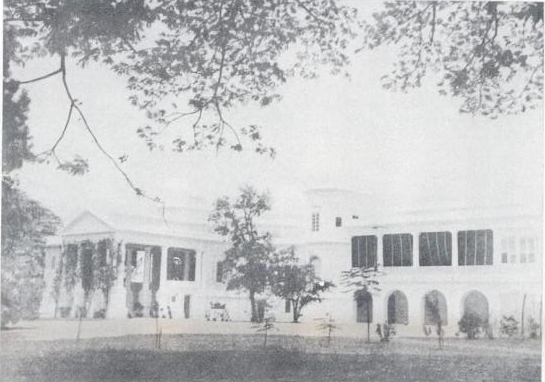
Brodie Castle in 1939

Thenral, earlier known as Brodie Castle, is a house in Chennai, India. Named after civil servant James Brodie (1769-1801) who constructed the house in 1796, it currently houses the School of Carnatic music.

== History ==
Brodie Castle was constructed by British East India Company servant and businessman, James Brodie on eleven acres of land gifted to him by the Government in Quibble Island in the town of Adyar, then located outside the limits of Madras city. Brodie inhabited the house for a short period but later, due to his declining fortunes, rented the house to tenants, the first of whom was Sir Thomas Strange, the first Chief Justice of the Supreme Court of Madras.

Following Brodie's death in 1801 in a boating accident, the family sold the property which was purchased by the Arbuthnot Family who resided in it for a while. Brodie was heir to the chief of clan Brodie, whose seat was Brodie Castle in Morayshire, Scotland. Brodie Castle is now owned by the National Trust for Scotland.
