= Kristen Broady =

Dr. Kristen Broady
- Education: Alcorn State University; Jackson State University
- Employer(s): Federal Reserve Bank of Chicago; Brookings Institution; Spelman College; Spelman College; University of Chicago; Dillard University; Howard University; Jiangsu Normal University
- Known for: Economics: wealth inequality

Kristen Broady is an American economist and academic. She was the Barron Hilton Endowed Professor of Financial Economics at Dillard University and became a senior economist directing the Economic Mobility Project at the Federal Reserve Bank of Chicago, and a nonresident senior fellow at the Brookings Institution. Her areas of specialty are the racial wealth gap, labor and automation, the economic impacts of the COVID-19 pandemic and returns to investment in higher education.

== Career ==
Broady earned her bachelor's degree at Alcorn State University followed by a Master of Business Administration and Doctorate in Business Administration majoring in Economics at Jackson State University. Subsequently she served on the faculties of Spelman College, the University of Chicago, Howard University and as a visiting faculty member of Jiangsu Normal University in Xuzhou, China. She was the Dean of the College of Business and Barron Hilton Endowed Professor of Financial Economics at Dillard University prior to joining the Federal Reserve Bank of Chicago.

She provided expert testimony on fintech cash flow products to the United States House of Representatives Committee on Financial Services in 2021. She was featured in an episode of the Federal Reserve Bank of St. Louis Timely Topics podcast, focusing on women in economics, and discussed workforce training for the post-COVID economy in an episode of The Conference Board's Sustaining Capitalism podcast series. She was an HBCU consultant for season two of The Quad on Black Entertainment Television (BET).
