= Brodie Neill =

Australian industrial designer

- Born: 1979 (age 46–47); Tasmania, Australia
- Occupation: Industrial designer

Brodie Neill (born 1979, in Tasmania, Australia) is an industrial designer based in London UK. Neill studied at the University of Tasmania (2002) before completing postgraduate studies at the Rhode Island School of Design (USA) in 2004. Brodie has quickly established himself within the international industry through a progressive use of form, resulting in design contributions included in such titles as Taschen’s Design Now (2007) and Time Magazine’s annual Design 100 (2008) featuring the most influential designs of today.

Among his notable designs are the E-turn for the Italian brand Kundalini, Jet table for Swarovski, the limited edition Remix for The Apartment Gallery London, and the @ Chair included in Time Magazine’s Design 100.
