= Steve Brodie =

Steve Brodie may refer to:

- Steve Brodie (bridge jumper) (1863–1901), American performer, claimed to have jumped off the Brooklyn Bridge
- Steve Brodie (actor) (1919–1992), American film actor
- Steve Brodie (baseball) (1868–1935), American baseball player
- Steve Brodie (footballer) (born 1973), English footballer
- Steve Brodie (record executive) (c.1927–2004), American record label owner and founder
- Steve Brodie (activist), Depression-era activist in Bloody Sunday (1938)

== See also ==
- Bernard Beryl Brodie (1907–1989), British biochemist and pharmacologist
