= Bruce Brodie (cricketer) =

South African cricketer (born 1937)

Personal information
- Full name: James Bruce Brodie
- Born: 19 March 1937; Graaff-Reinet, Cape Province, South Africa
- Died: 31 July 2024 (aged 87)
- Batting: Right-handed
- Bowling: Right-arm fast-medium
- Role: Bowler

Domestic team information
- Years: Team
- 1959–1960: Cambridge University Cricket Club
- 1961/62–1963/64: Eastern Province
- Source: Cricinfo, 28 March 2017

James Bruce Brodie (19 March 1937 – 31 July 2024) was a South African cricketer and lawyer. He played twenty-two first-class matches for Cambridge University Cricket Club and Eastern Province between 1959 and 1964.

In 1960, Brodie recorded his career-best bowling figures of 5/47 playing for Cambridge University against the touring South Africa team, taking five of the first six wickets to fall.

Brodie worked as a lawyer for Frere Cholmeley in London, specialising in litigation before joining the bar at 55.

== See also ==
- List of Cambridge University Cricket Club players
