= Ian Brodie (journalist) =

British journalist, foreign correspondent and author

Ian Ellery Brodie, OBE (23 March 1936 – 8 May 2008) was a British journalist, foreign correspondent and author. From 1986 to 2001 he worked in the Washington bureaux of The Daily Telegraph and then The Times.

== Career ==
Brodie was born in Bath, but raised in Luton. After leaving school at 16, Brodie joined the Luton News. Following national service he worked for the Daily Sketch and then the Daily Express. Promoted to deputy foreign editor, he was moved through positions in Moscow, Southeast Asia and the United States. After returning to England as foreign editor of the Daily Express, he became the last editor of the Scottish Daily Express until it closed in 1974.

In 1975 Brodie moved to Los Angeles and reported for The Daily Telegraph. A resident of Topanga, Brodie invested in local paper The Topanga Messenger and remained as its publisher until his death.

In 1986 Brodie became bureau chief in Washington for The Daily Telegraph, moving on to The Times Washington bureau in 1993. During this time he co-authored the book Learning to Sail.

In 1994 Brodie was awarded an OBE for services to journalism.

Brodie retired in 2001 after suffering a stroke. He died on 8 May 2008 at the age of 72.

== Obituaries ==
- The Daily Telegraph
- The Times
- The Boston Globe
- Topanga Messenger
