= Richard Brodie (cricketer) =

Scottish-born Australian cricketer

Richard Sinclair Brodie (9 September 1813 – 18 January 1872) was a Scottish-born Australian cricketer who played for Victoria. He was born in Caithness and died in Bulla, Victoria.

Brodie made a single first-class appearance for the side, during the 1853–54 season, against Tasmania. From the lower order, he scored six runs in the first innings in which he batted, and a single run in the second.

Brodie became a wealthy landowner, owning by 1870 3500 acres of land in Bulla and over 3000 sheep. He became insane in that year and died by drowning in Emu Creek near his house after being left alone by attendants.
