= Brodie baronets =

There have been two baronetcies created for persons with the surname Brodie, both in the Baronetage of the United Kingdom.

- Brodie baronets of Boxford (1834)
- Brodie baronets of Idvies (1892): see Thomas Dawson Brodie
